= Ralph Avenue =

Ralph Avenue may refer to:

- Ralph Avenue (BMT Fulton Street Line), a station on the demolished BMT Fulton Street Line
- Ralph Avenue (IND Fulton Street Line), a station on the IND Fulton Street Line of the New York City Subway
- Ralph Avenue, a street that runs north–south in Brooklyn, New York
