= Ralph Avenue station (BMT Fulton Street Line) =

Ralph Ave.

General information
- Location: Fulton Street & Ralph Avenue; Weeksville, Bedford–Stuyvesant, Brooklyn, New York
- Coordinates: 40.678874°N 73.921665°W
- Line: BMT Fulton Street Line
- Platforms: 2 side platforms
- Tracks: 2
- Connections: Ralph Avenue Line

Construction
- Structure type: Elevated

History
- Opened: September 20, 1888; 137 years ago
- Closed: May 31, 1940; 86 years ago

Former services
| Preceding station | BMT Lines | Following station |
|---|---|---|
| Reid Avenue toward Park Row or Fulton Ferry | 13: Fulton Street Local | Saratoga Avenue toward Lefferts Avenue |
Location

The Ralph Avenue station was a station on the demolished BMT Fulton Street Line in Brooklyn, New York City.

== Station layout ==
It had two tracks and two side platforms.

== History ==
It was opened on September 20, 1888, and served by trains of the BMT Fulton Street Line. It also had a connection to the trolley lines of the same name. Ralph Avenue was the easternmost station on the line until it was expanded to Rockaway Avenue on November 16, 1888. Less than a month later Saratoga Avenue would replace Ralph Avenue as the penultimate station on the line. The next stop to the east was Saratoga Avenue. The next stop to the west was Utica Avenue.

In 1936, the Independent Subway System built their own Fulton Street subway and added an underground subway station with the same name. The elevated station became obsolete, and it closed on May 31, 1940.
