= Saratoga Avenue station =

Saratoga Avenue station may refer to:

- Saratoga Avenue (IRT New Lots Line), a station on the IRT New Lots Line
- Saratoga Avenue (BMT Fulton Street Line), a station on the demolished BMT Fulton Street Line
