= Reid Avenue station (BMT Fulton Street Line) =

Reid Ave.

General information
- Location: Fulton Street, Reid and Utica Avenues, Weeksville, Bedford–Stuyvesant, Brooklyn, New York
- Coordinates: 40.679276°N 73.929100°W
- Line: BMT Fulton Street Line
- Platforms: 2 side platforms
- Tracks: 2
- Connections: Reid Avenue Line

Construction
- Structure type: Elevated

History
- Opened: September 20, 1888; 138 years ago
- Closed: May 31, 1940; 86 years ago
- Former names: Utica Avenue

Former services
Preceding station	BMT Lines	Following station
Troy Avenue toward Park Row or Fulton Ferry	13: Fulton Street Local	Ralph Avenue toward Lefferts Avenue
Location

Reid Avenue was a station on the demolished BMT Fulton Street Line. It had 2 tracks and 2 side platforms. It was served by trains of the BMT Fulton Street Line. The station was opened in 1888 and was originally named Utica Avenue station. Sometime between 1912 and 1924, the name of the station was changed to Reid Avenue. The station was also served by a streetcar line with the same name both before and after the name change. The next stop to the east was Ralph Avenue. The next stop to the west was Troy Avenue. In 1936, the Independent Subway System built their own Fulton Street subway and added an underground subway station with the old name. The elevated station became obsolete, and it closed on May 31, 1940. The closure was part of the city's 1940 abandonment of the Fulton Street Elevated west of Rockaway Avenue, following the opening of the Independent Subway System's Fulton Street subway.
