= Rockaway Avenue station (BMT Fulton Street Line) =

Rockaway Avenue
- Former New York City Subway station

Station statistics
- Address: Fulton Street & Rockaway Avenue; Brooklyn, NY 11233
- Borough: Brooklyn
- Locale: Bedford–Stuyvesant
- Coordinates: 40.678262°N 73.910775°W
- Division: B (BMT)
- Line: BMT Fulton Street Line
- Services: None
- Transit: Wilson Avenue Line
- Structure: Elevated
- Platforms: 2 side platforms, 1 island platform
- Tracks: 2

Other information
- Opened: November 16, 1888; 137 years ago
- Closed: April 26, 1956; 69 years ago

Station succession
- Next west: Saratoga Avenue (1888–1940) (Terminus) (1940–1956)
- Next east: Manhattan Junction
Location

Street map

The Rockaway Avenue station was a station on the demolished BMT Fulton Street Line in Brooklyn, New York City, served by the 13 train throughout its existence. It had two tracks and two side platforms, and a center island platform. It also had a connection to the Wilson Avenue Line trolleys. Rockaway Avenue was the easternmost station on the line until it was expanded to Atlantic Avenue on July 4, 1889. The next stop to the west was Saratoga Avenue until May 30, 1940, after which all stations on the line west of Rockaway Avenue were closed and a free transfer became available to the IND Fulton Street Line at the 1936-built subway station of the same name. The next stop to the east was Manhattan Junction. The station closed on April 26, 1956.
