= Ralph Avenue station (IND Fulton Street Line) =

New York City Subway station in Brooklyn

Ralph Avenue
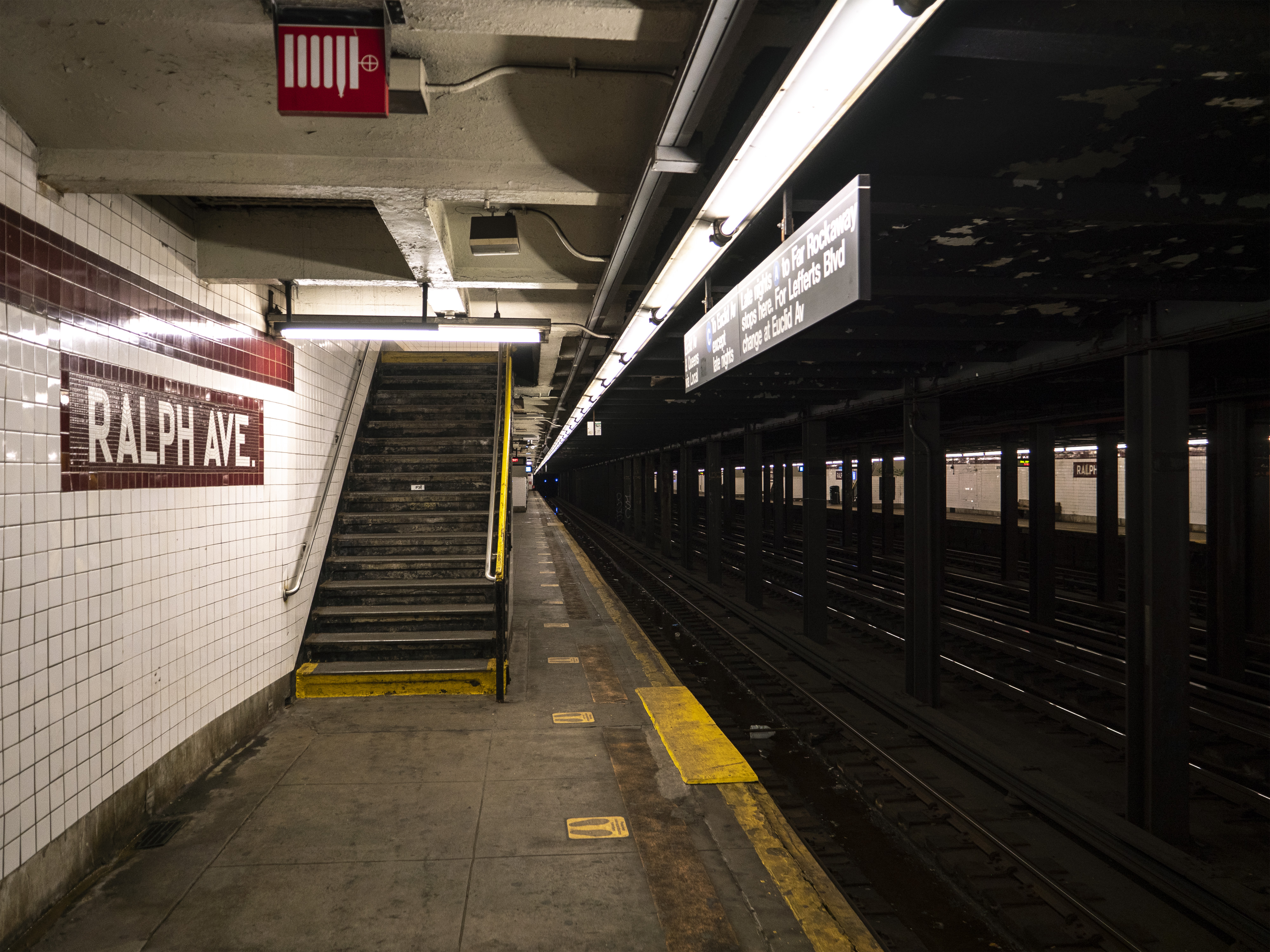
- View from southbound platform

Station statistics
- Address: Ralph Avenue & Fulton Street; Brooklyn, New York
- Borough: Brooklyn
- Locale: Bedford–Stuyvesant, Ocean Hill
- Coordinates: 40.678815°N 73.92168°W
- Division: B (IND)
- Line: IND Fulton Street Line
- Services: A (late nights); C (all except late nights)
- Transit: NYCT Bus: B25, B47
- Structure: Underground
- Platforms: 2 side platforms
- Tracks: 4

Other information
- Opened: April 9, 1936; 90 years ago

Traffic
- 2025: 1,221,277 ▲11.9%
- Rank: 272 out of 423
Services
Preceding station	New York City Subway	Following station
Utica Avenue A C toward 168th Street	Local	Rockaway Avenue A C toward Euclid Avenue
Location
Location within New York City Subway
Location within New York City
Location within New York
Track layout
Street map
Station service legend
Symbol	Description
Stops all times except late nights	Stops all times except late nights
Stops late nights only	Stops late nights only

The Ralph Avenue station is a local station on the IND Fulton Street Line of the New York City Subway. Located in Brooklyn at the intersection of Ralph Avenue and Fulton Street, it is served by the C train at all times except late nights, when the A train takes over service.

== History ==
This underground station opened on April 9, 1936, and replaced the BMT Fulton Street El. The Ralph Avenue El station, which was formerly above the current subway station, closed on May 31, 1940.

The New York City Board of Transportation announced plans in November 1949 to spend $325,000 extending platforms at several IND stations, including Ralph Avenue, to accommodate 11-car, 660-foot (200 m) trains. The lengthened trains began running during rush hour on September 8, 1953, with eleven-car trains operating on weekdays. The project cost $400,000 and increased the total carrying capacity of rush-hour trains by 4,000 passengers. The operation of eleven-car trains ended in 1958 because of operational difficulties. The signal blocks, especially in Manhattan, were too short to accommodate the longer trains, and the motormen had a very small margin of error to properly align the train with the platform. It was found that operating ten-car trains allowed for two additional trains per hour to be scheduled.

== Station layout ==
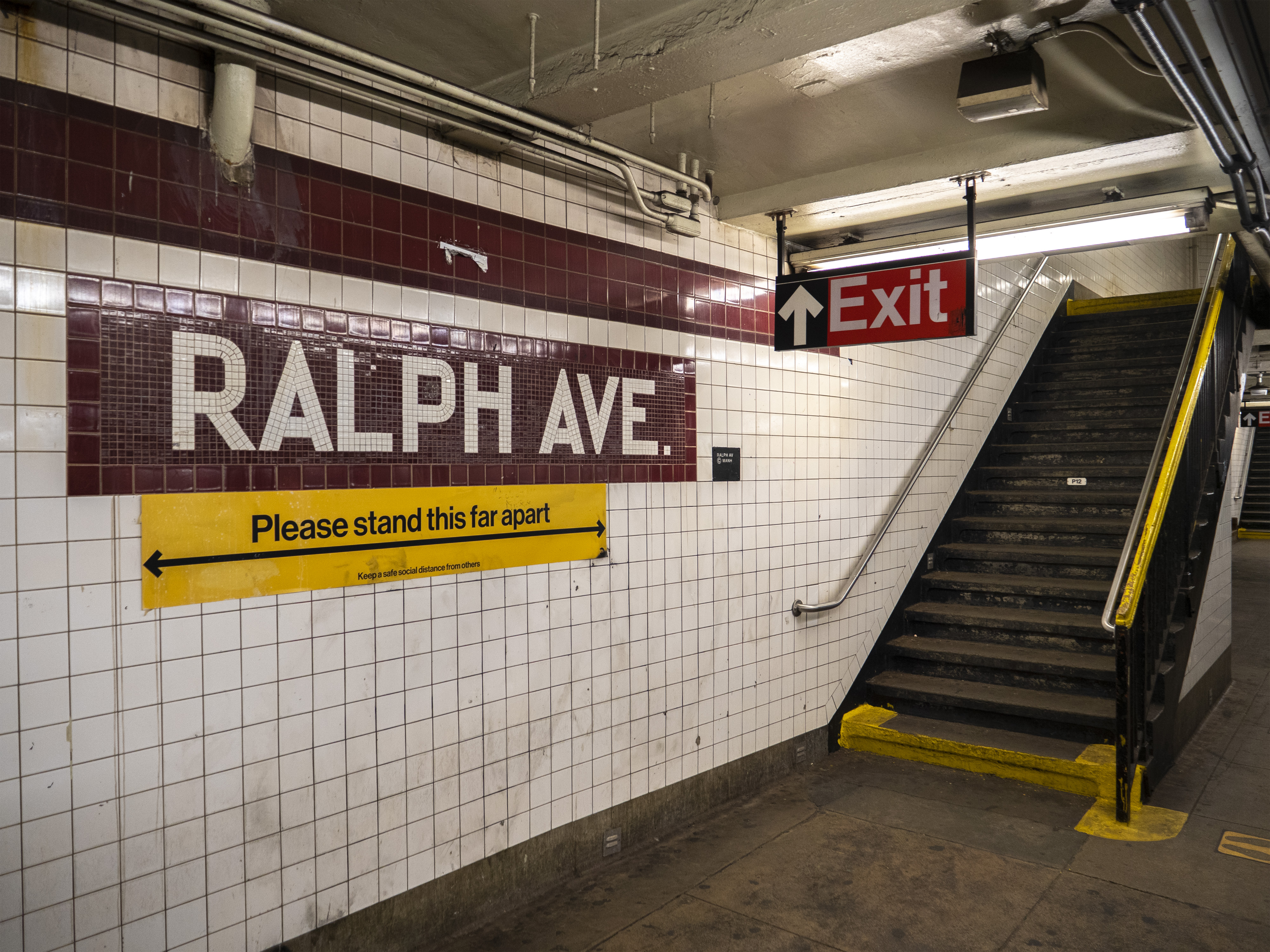
Mosaic name tablet and stair to mezzanine on the northbound platform

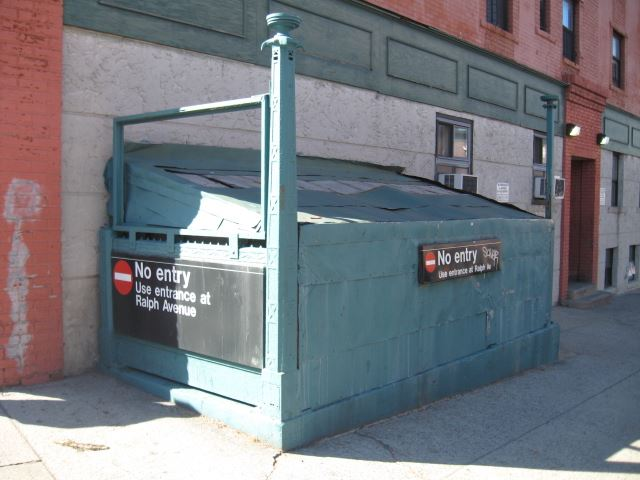
Closed entrance at Howard Avenue

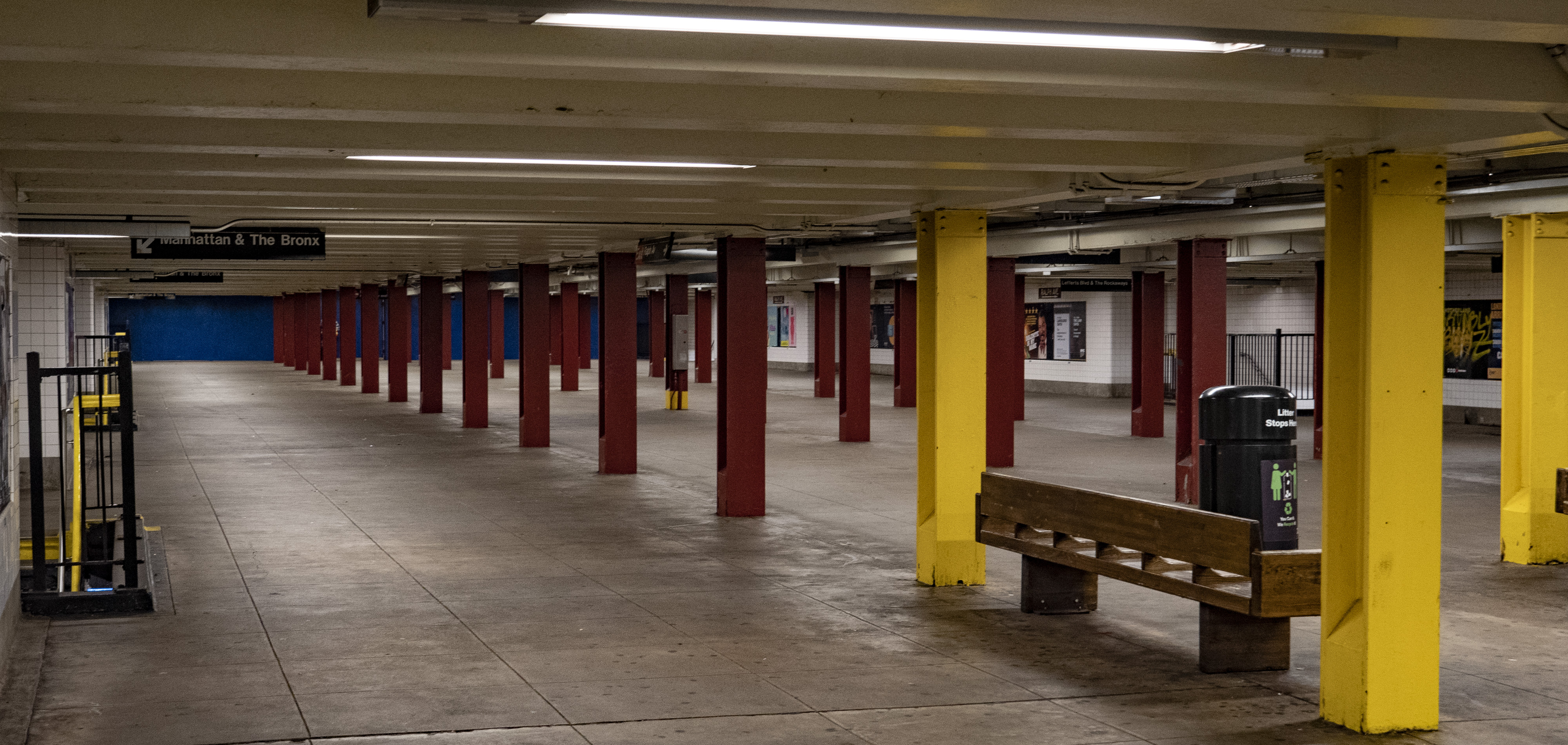
Mezzanine level, facing the closed end

The station has four tracks and two side platforms. The two express tracks are used by the A train during daytime hours.

Both platforms are column-less and have a maroon trim-line with a deep maroon border and name tablets reading "RALPH AVE." in white sans-serif lettering on a deep maroon background and maroon border. Underneath the trim line are small directional and station signs reading "RALPH" in white lettering on a black background.

This station has a full length mezzanine above the platforms and tracks. Only the western entrance is open to the public, and there are four staircases to each platform. The mezzanine columns are painted maroon (previously dark livid) except for those that had payphones on them, which are instead painted yellow.

=== Exits ===
The fare control area at the extreme west end has a bank of four turnstiles and one exit-only turnstile. There are a token booth and two street stairs, one to the southeast corner of Ralph Avenue and Fulton Street and the other to the northeast peninsula formed by Ralph Avenue, MacDougal Street, and Fulton Street.

This station formerly had another entrance/exit to Howard Avenue and Fulton Street at the east (railroad south) end. The street stairs on the northwest side of the intersection, though closed, remain intact, but the street stairs on the southwest side of the intersection were sealed. Both platforms have one staircase to the closed-off portion of the mezzanine.
