= Saratoga Avenue station (BMT Fulton Street Line) =

Saratoga Ave.

General information
- Location: Fulton Street & Saratoga Avenue; Bedford–Stuyvesant, Brooklyn, New York
- Coordinates: 40.678580°N 73.916322°W
- Line(s): BMT Fulton Street Line
- Platforms: 2 side platforms
- Tracks: 2

Construction
- Structure type: Elevated

History
- Opened: December 3, 1888; 136 years ago
- Closed: May 31, 1940; 85 years ago

Former services
Preceding station	BMT Lines	Following station
Ralph Avenue toward Park Row or Fulton Ferry	13: Fulton Street Local	Rockaway Avenue toward Lefferts Avenue
Location

The Saratoga Avenue station was a station on the demolished BMT Fulton Street Line in Brooklyn, New York City. It had 2 tracks and 2 side platforms. It was built on December 3, 1888 and was served by trains of the BMT Fulton Street Line. Saratoga Avenue replaced Ralph Avenue as the penultimate station on the line until it was expanded to Atlantic Avenue on July 4th, 1889. The next stop to the east was Rockaway Avenue. The next stop to the west was Ralph Avenue.

In 1936, the Independent Subway System built their own Fulton Street subway, but unlike the next stops to the west and east, it did not add a subway station to compete with Saratoga Avenue. The elevated station became obsolete, and it closed on May 31, 1940.
