= Utica Avenue station =

New York City Subway station in Brooklyn

Utica Avenue
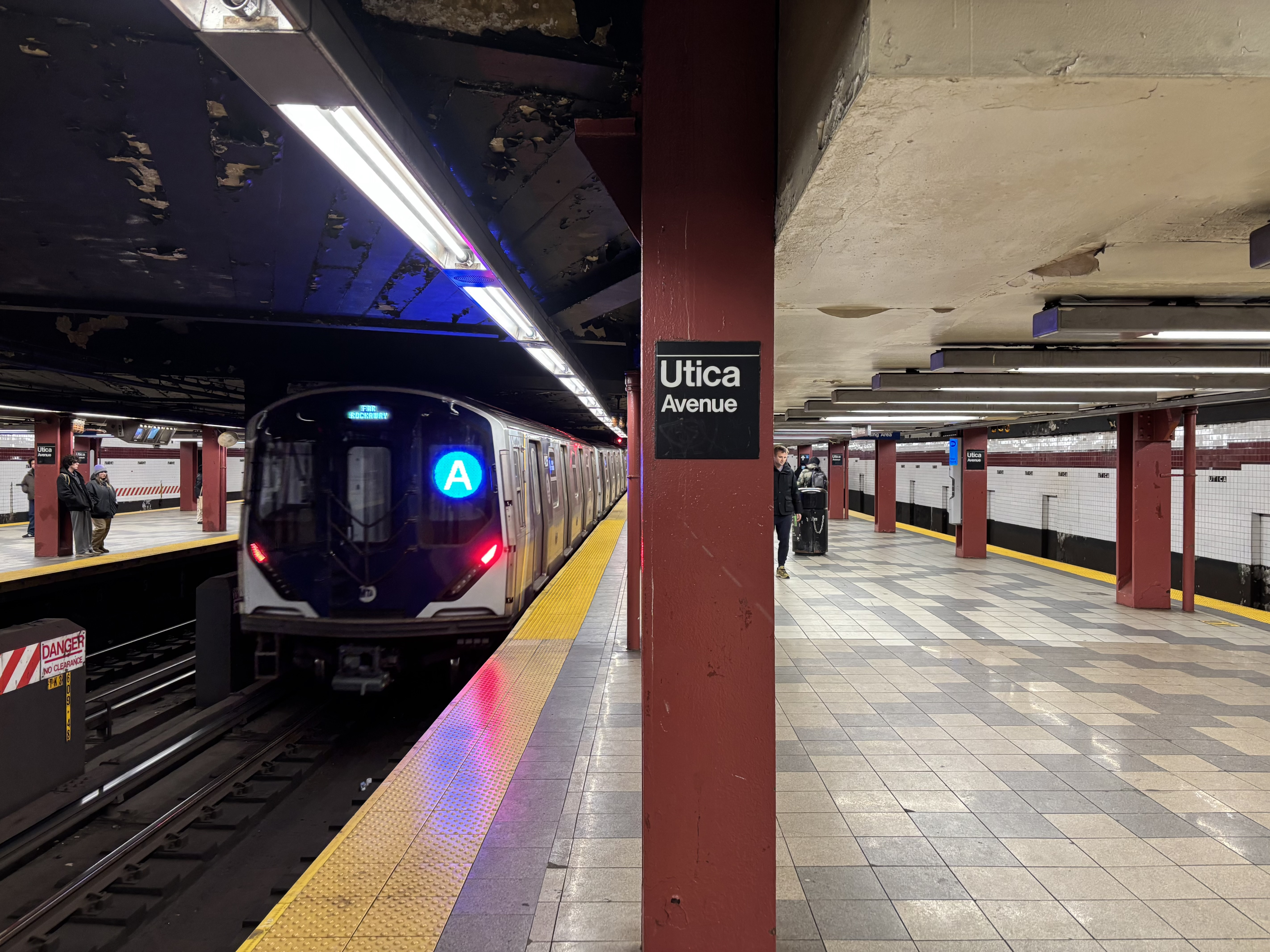
- R211A A train departing from the southbound platform

Station statistics
- Address: Utica Avenue & Fulton Street; Brooklyn, New York
- Borough: Brooklyn
- Locale: Bedford–Stuyvesant
- Coordinates: 40.679239°N 73.929062°W
- Division: B (IND)
- Line: IND Fulton Street Line
- Services: A (all times); C (all except late nights)
- Transit: NYCT Bus: B25, B46, B46 SBS
- Structure: Underground
- Platforms: 2 island platforms cross-platform interchange
- Tracks: 4

Other information
- Opened: April 9, 1936; 90 years ago
- Accessible: Yes

Traffic
- 2025: 3,472,857 ▲21.6%
- Rank: 105 out of 423
Services
Preceding station	New York City Subway	Following station
Nostrand Avenue A toward Inwood–207th Street	Express	Broadway Junction A toward Far Rockaway–Mott Avenue or Ozone Park–Lefferts Boulevard
Kingston–Throop Avenues A C toward 168th Street	Local	Ralph Avenue A C toward Euclid Avenue
Location
Location within New York City Subway
Location within New York City
Location within New York
Track layout
Street map
Station service legend
Symbol	Description
Stops all times except late nights	Stops all times except late nights
Stops all times	Stops all times
Stops late nights only	Stops late nights only

The Utica Avenue station is an express station on the IND Fulton Street Line of the New York City Subway. Located at Utica Avenue and Fulton Street in Bedford–Stuyvesant, Brooklyn, it is served by the A train at all times and the C train at all times except late nights.

== History ==
This underground station opened on April 9, 1936, as part of an extension of the Independent Subway System (IND) from its previous Brooklyn terminus at Jay Street–Borough Hall, which opened three years earlier, to Rockaway Avenue. The new IND subway replaced the BMT Fulton Street El. The Reid Avenue El station, which was originally named Utica Avenue and was formerly above the current subway station, closed on May 31, 1940.

== Station layout ==
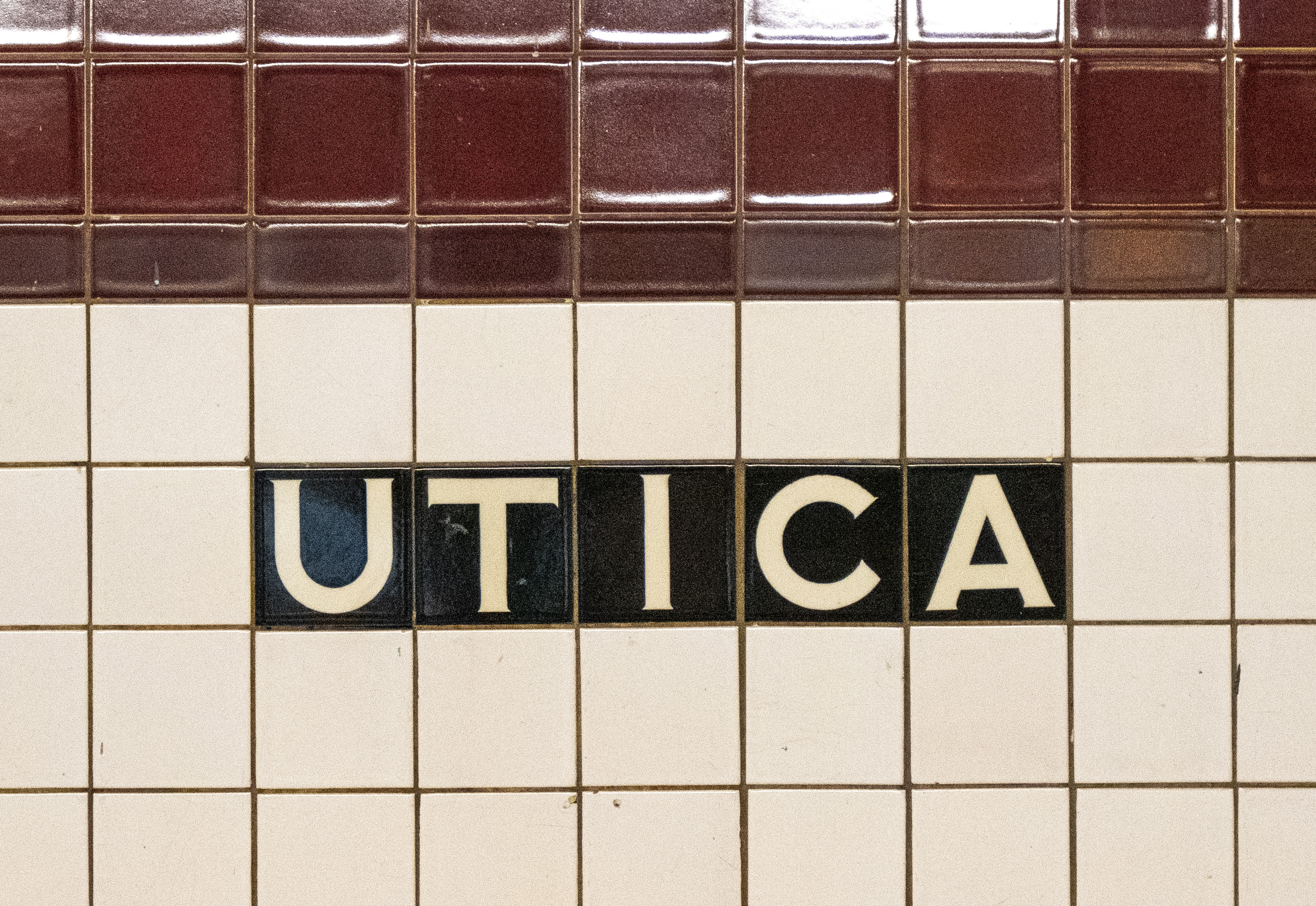
Tile caption below trim line

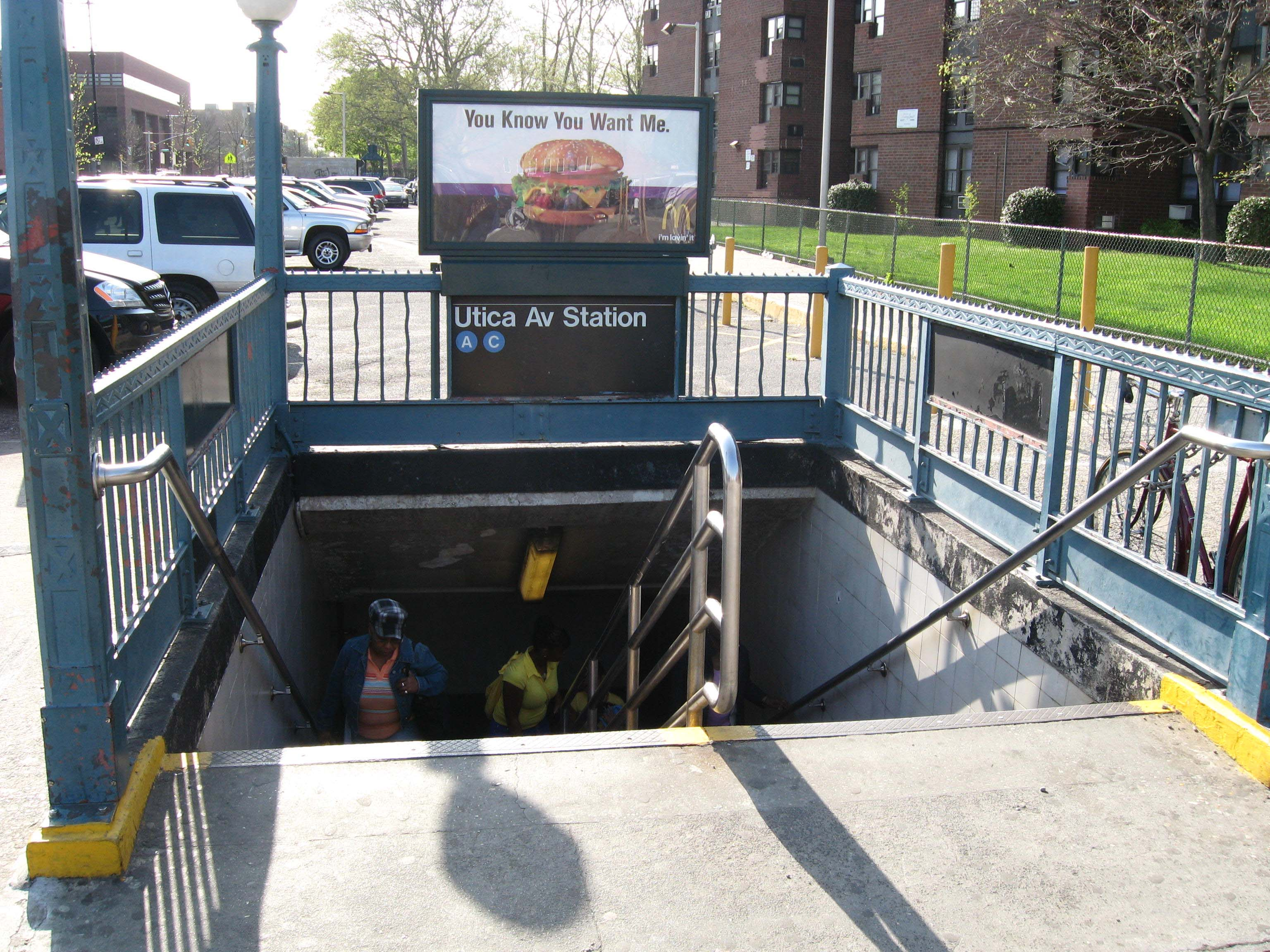
North side street stair

The station has four tracks and two island platforms, typical for a four-track express station. The A stops here at all times, running express during the day and local at night, while the C stops here at all times except nights and is local. The next stop to the west (railroad north) is Kingston–Throop Avenues for local trains and Nostrand Avenue for express trains; the next stop to the east (railroad south) is Ralph Avenue for local trains and Broadway Junction for express trains. The outer track walls are made of tile and have a maroon trim line with a dark maroon border. Small black tile captions reading "UTICA" in white lettering on a black background run below the trim line at regular intervals. The station's I-beam columns are painted maroon, alternating ones having the standard black station name plate with white lettering. Renovations added looping maroon tile patterns at the mezzanine level, as well as the platform's floor pattern. Renovations also added new old-fashioned light fixtures with modern sodium-vapor lamps in them, which are suspended on long rods from the high, vaulted ceilings.

This station has two fare control areas, one at either end. The full-time side at the eastern (railroad south) end has two staircases from each platform going up to a crossover (the western ones go up to a ramp that leads to the main fare control area), where a turnstile bank and two exit-only turnstiles provide access to and from the station. Outside fare control, there is a token booth and two street stairs, each going to either western corners of Utica Avenue and Fulton Street. The station's other fare control area has two staircases going down to each platform, a crossover, part-time turnstile bank and customer assistance booth, high entry/exit turnstiles that provide full-time access to and from the station, and two staircases going up to either side of Fulton Street between Stuyvesant and Schenectady Avenues.

Unusually, there are two mezzanine levels; the upper mezzanine level was closed off after a 1995 renovation, and the lower mezzanine level is actually the platform level of the unbuilt Utica Avenue line.

Between this station and Ralph Avenue, there is a fifth track between the express tracks, which could be used for storage or turning trains, although it is not normally used. The storage/layup tracks ends with bumper blocks on both ends, with a switch to the northbound express track on its west end and a switch to the southbound express track on the east end.

The artwork at the Utica Avenue station was made in 1996 by Jimmy James Green and is called Children's Cathedral. The work consists of ten mosaic panels that are based on hundreds of drawings from neighborhood children. The scenes depict neighborhood residents doing everyday activities.

=== Unfinished station ===
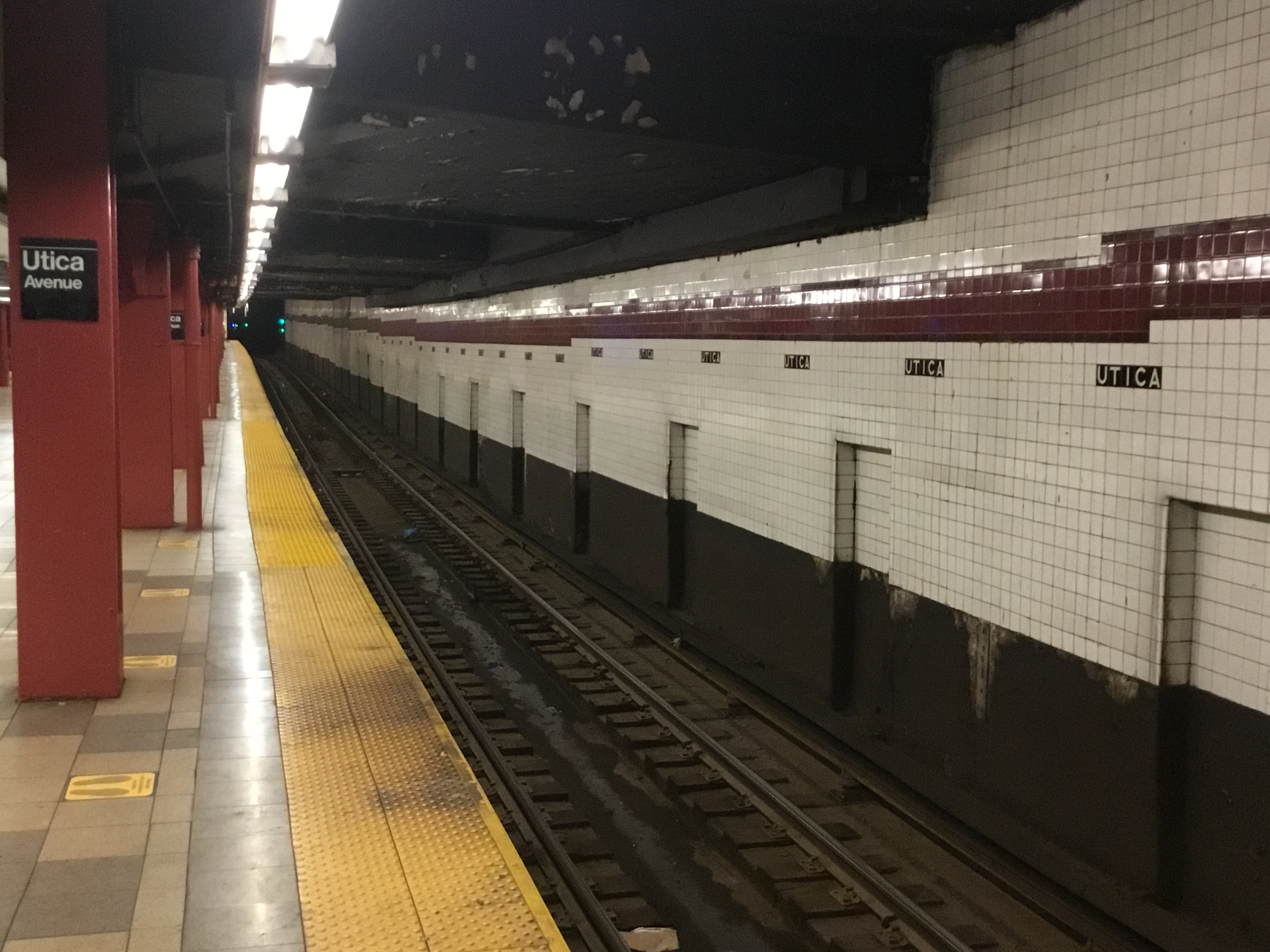
The provision for the upper level station can be seen on the ceiling above the Fulton Street Line platforms.

The center of the station slopes down and there is a lowered ceiling compared to the rest of the station. Above is a disused portion of a mezzanine and an unfinished upper level station. The tracks are outlined by a pattern in the ceiling on top of the four trackways at the Utica Avenue station; therefore it appears that there are four trackways and two island platforms running diagonally across the ceiling in the center. The unfinished upper level station was to be built for a subway line down Utica Avenue as part of the IND Second System.

There were blocked stairways up from the platform level to the upper level that were removed during the station's renovation. Climbing the steps to the intermediate level, there are locked doors that serve as access to the unfinished platforms. There are also some windows in this level. Looking into the window reveals a cinder-block wall that were erected to prevent glimpses into the closed portion of the intermediate level mezzanine. Climbing the ramp to the entrance level reveals more windows and doors. These doors provide access to the disused portion of the upper level mezzanine, which has steps leading to the disused portion of the intermediate level mezzanine (which in turn leads directly to the unfinished station).

Before the renovation of this station in 1995, it was possible to see the unfinished station from the mezzanine. In the intermediate level of the mezzanine, the closed section of the mezzanine was blocked only by a chain-link fence. Past the fence, there was a tiled wall with a door. The door had some panels missing, and whenever open, a look into the door revealed the unfinished upper level station. After the 1990s renovation of the Utica Avenue station, the mezzanine was shortened using cinder-block walls and the current tiling in the intermediate level, hiding the chain-link fence and the door behind it.

=== Exits ===
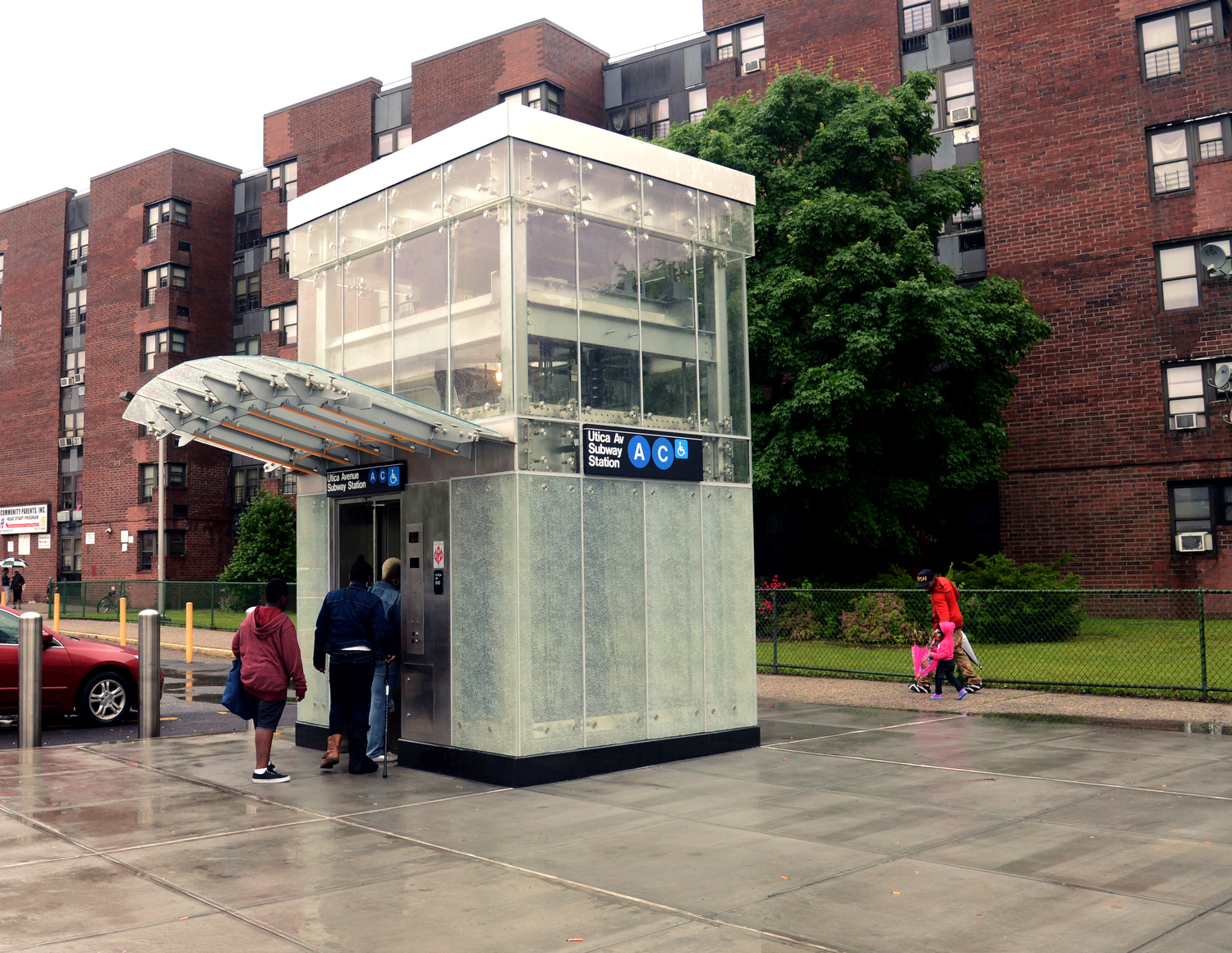
Elevator

This station is compliant with the 1990 Americans With Disabilities Act. In May 2014, MTA installed three elevators: one near the intersection of Utica Avenue and Fulton Street, connecting the mezzanine to the street, and two elevators connecting the platforms to the mezzanine.

There are four stair entrances, all on Fulton Street:

- South side of Fulton Street west of Utica Avenue, at Boys and Girls High School
- North side of Fulton Street west of Utica Avenue (staircase and elevator)
- South side of Fulton Street west of Stuyvesant Avenue
- North side of Fulton Street west of Stuyvesant Avenue
