= C (New York City Subway service) =

Rapid transit service

- Eighth Avenue Local

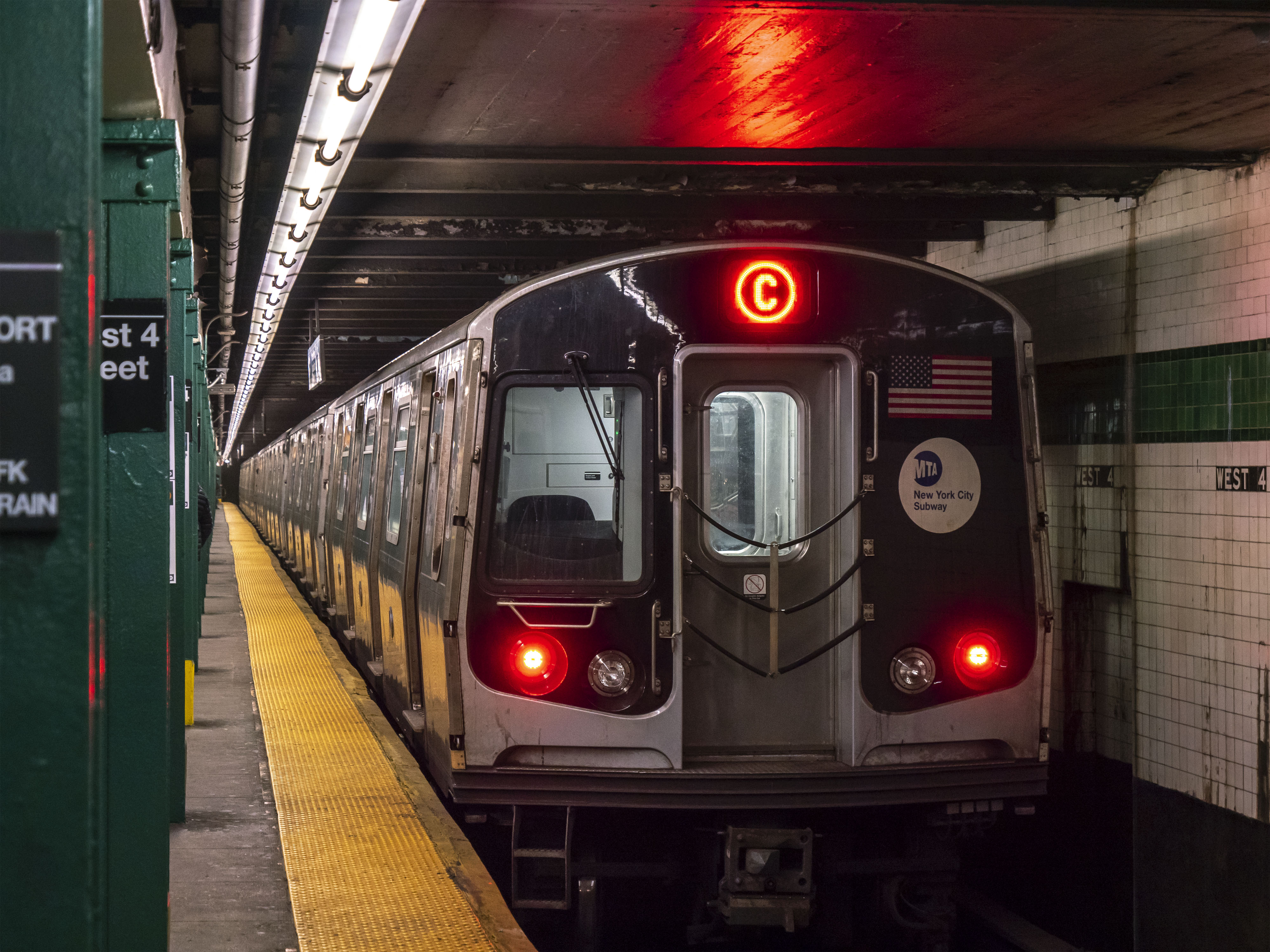
- A 168th Street-bound R179 C train at West Fourth Street

- Northern end: 168th Street
- Southern end: Euclid Avenue
- Stations: 40
- Rolling stock: R179; R211A (Rolling stock assignments subject to change)
- Depot: 207th Street Yard (R179); Pitkin Yard (R211A)
- Started service: September 10, 1932; 94 years ago

The C Eighth Avenue Local is a 19-mile-long (31 km) rapid transit service in the B Division of the New York City Subway. Its route emblem, or "bullet", is colored blue since it is a part of the IND Eighth Avenue Line in Manhattan.

The C operates during daytime hours only between 168th Street in Washington Heights, Manhattan and Euclid Avenue in East New York, Brooklyn, making all stops along the full route; overnight service is replaced by the A train, which makes all stops along the C's route.

Historically, most C service ran only during rush hours, along the IND Concourse Line to Bedford Park Boulevard in the Bronx and later along the IND Rockaway Line to Rockaway Park–Beach 116th Street in Queens. Prior to 1985, the local C service was referred to as the CC, with the C designation reserved for a complementary express service that was discontinued in 1949. The CC was once the only route to serve the Bronx, Manhattan, Brooklyn, and Queens in a single trip. Outside of rush hour, local service in Manhattan was usually provided by the AA, later relabeled K, which ran between 168th Street and Chambers Street/World Trade Center. In 1988, the K and C were consolidated into one service, and during the 1990s, the C's routing was altered to create the current service pattern. A 2015 study of the route found that the C had a daily ridership of 250,000.

== History ==
=== Original IND service ===
The AA and CC services were the predecessors to the current C service. A and AA service began on September 10, 1932, with the opening of the first line of the Independent Subway System (IND), the Eighth Avenue Line. The IND used single letters to refer to express services and double letters for local services. The A ran express and the AA ran local from 168th Street to Chambers Street/World Trade Center, known at the time as Hudson Terminal. The AA ran at all times, and it was extended to 207th Street during nights and on Sundays when the A did not run. On February 1, 1933, the AA was extended to the newly-opened Jay Street–Borough Hall station when the A did not run, continuing to terminate at Chambers Street when the A did run.

The C and CC services began operation on July 1, 1933, when the IND Concourse Line opened. C trains operated between Norwood–205th Street in the Bronx and Bergen Street during weekday rush hours and Saturday mornings and afternoons and made express stops between Tremont Avenue and 145th Street in the peak direction. CC trains replaced the AA Eighth Avenue Local and operated between either 205th Street or Bedford Park Boulevard in the Bronx and Hudson Terminal in Manhattan and made all stops along the full route; CC service originated and terminated at Bedford Park Boulevard instead of 205th Street when the C was operating. C trains left Bergen Street between 3:30 p.m. and 6:50 p.m., and left 205th Street between 6:33 a.m. and 11:26 a.m. C trains ran every 4 minutes during rush hours in the peak direction, and every 5 minutes in the reverse-peak direction, and ran with 6- and 7-car trains. During morning rush hours, CC trains operated to 205th Street until 7:30 a.m., and to Tremont Avenue between 7:30 a.m. and 11:30 a.m.. PM rush hour CC trains terminated at Bedford Park Boulevard, and several other trains terminated and originated at Bedford Park Boulevard. CC trains ran every 4 minutes during rush hours, 5 minutes during middays, every 5 and 6 trains during evenings, and every 12 minutes overnight. Trains ran with 5 cars during rush hours, and with 3 cars other times. On August 17, 1933, CC trains stopped terminating at Tremont Avenue.

On January 1, 1936, C service was extended to Jay Street–Borough Hall. On April 9, 1936, C service was extended to Hoyt–Schermerhorn Streets. After July 1, 1937, a few C trains continued to run to Bergen Street southbound in the morning rush hour and northbound in the evening rush hour. Also on the same date, weekend C service was discontinued, and CC service was extended to 205th Street to compensate.

=== IND Sixth Avenue Line opens ===
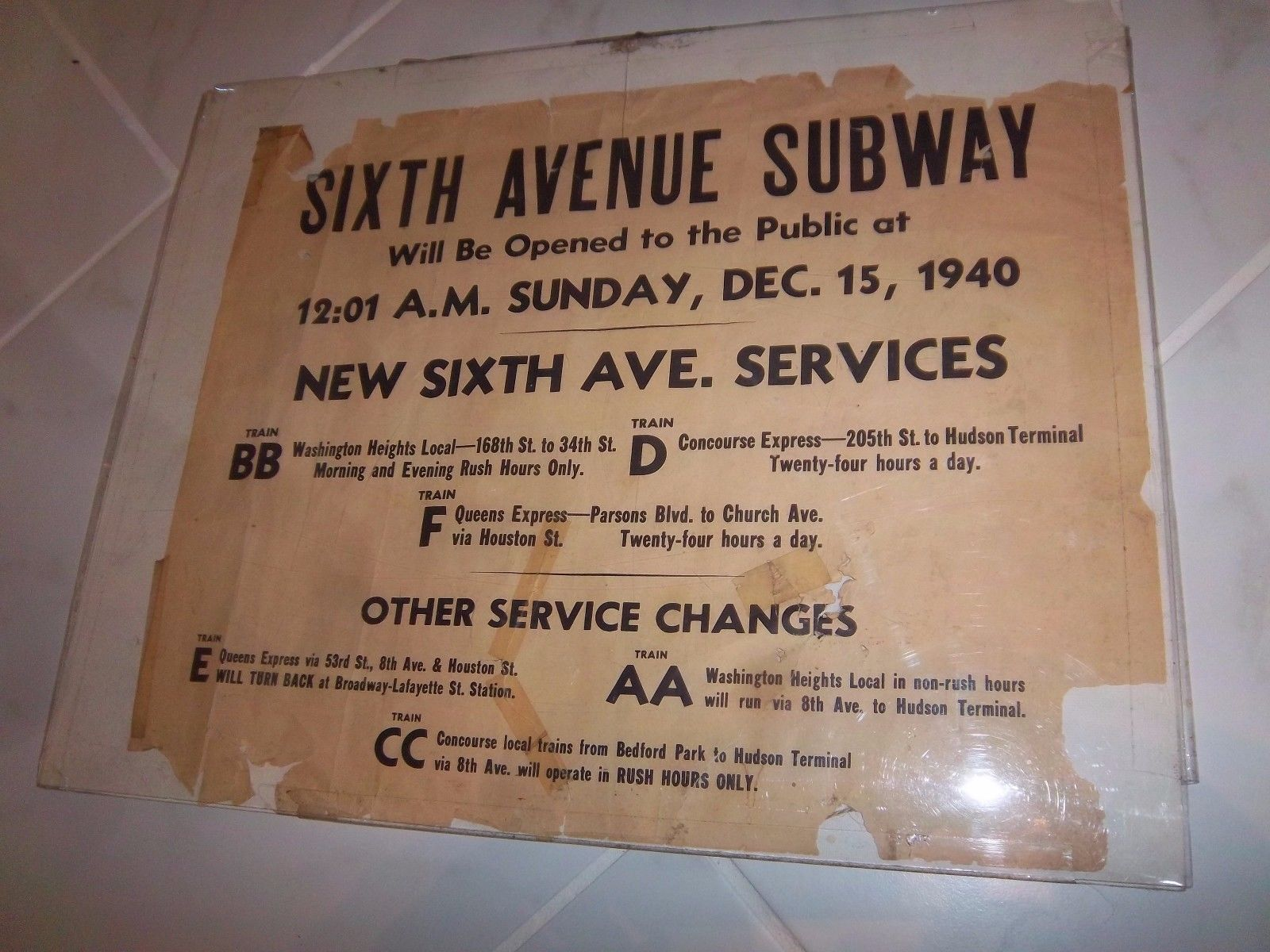
"Sixth Avenue Subway Will Be Opened to the Public at 12:01 A.M. Sunday, Dec. 15, 1940"

On December 15, 1940, the IND Sixth Avenue Line opened. Two new services, the BB (later B) and D, began running. These lines ran on the Eighth Avenue Line in upper Manhattan, switching to the Sixth Avenue Line in Midtown. The BB ran local to 168th Street during rush hours. The D joined the C as the peak direction Concourse Express. CC trains now ran between Hudson Terminal and Bedford Park during rush hours and on Saturdays and during other times, the D made local stops in the Bronx, replacing CC service. On the same date, limited morning rush hour service began between 205th Street, Bronx and Utica Avenue, Brooklyn, making local stops on the IND Fulton Street Line. AA service was reinstated during this time, but only during off-peak hours (non-rush hours, late Saturday afternoons and Sundays) when the BB and CC did not operate. The CC would provide Eighth Avenue Line local service during rush hours. In the 1940s, C trains ran every 10 minutes during rush hour, CC trains ran every 4 minutes, and D trains ran every 5 minutes.

On October 24, 1949, C express service was discontinued. Additional D service was added to offset this loss. The CC, which only ran during rush hours, began terminating at Broadway–Lafayette Street Mondays to Fridays, and on Saturdays CC service continued to operate to Hudson Terminal. On January 5, 1952, Saturday service was discontinued; Saturday service last ran on December 29, 1951. Weekday CC service returned to its previous terminal at Hudson Terminal on October 30, 1954.

On August 30, 1976, the CC train replaced the E train as the rush-hour local along the IND Fulton Street Line and IND Rockaway Line, running from Rockaway Park–Beach 116th Street in Queens through Brooklyn and Manhattan to Bedford Park Boulevard in the Bronx, making it the only service to run through all four boroughs served by the subway. The Rockaway Park Shuttle HH was renamed CC. This shuttle ran between Broad Channel and Rockaway Park during off-peak hours, except late nights. With this, all daytime service to and from Rockaway Park was named CC. Late nights, the shuttle ran between Euclid Avenue, Rockaway Park and Far Rockaway–Mott Avenue via Hammels Wye, and was labeled A.

On August 28, 1977, late night AA service was eliminated. The A began making local stops in Manhattan during late nights, when the AA was not running.

On May 6, 1985, the IND practice of using double letters to indicate local service was discontinued. The AA was renamed the K and rush hour CC service was renamed C. The off-peak Rockaway Park Shuttle was renamed H. This change was not officially reflected in schedules until May 24, 1987.

=== Late 1980s and 1990s ===
On December 10, 1988, the K designation was discontinued and merged into the C, which now operated every day during daytime hours only. The C operated between Bedford Park Boulevard and Beach 116th Street during weekday rush hours, between 145th Street and Beach 116th Street during weekday midday hours, and between 145th Street and the World Trade Center during weekday evening and weekend daytime hours; C service made all stops along the route, regardless of the time of day. A express service in Brooklyn was expanded to operate during weekday midday hours, and B service to and from 168th Street was expanded to operate during weekday midday and early evening hours as well. Some midday trains also originated and terminated at Euclid Avenue, with trains alternating between Euclid Avenue and Beach 116th Street as southern terminals.

In January 1991, a reduction of service along the Central Park West, Eighth Avenue and Fulton Street corridors to remove excess capacity was proposed. Initially, the C designation would be eliminated, being replaced by the A making all stops in Manhattan and Brooklyn between 168th Street and Euclid Avenue. The service change was later amended to retain the C designation, but with a new service pattern: service would make all stops between 168th Street and Euclid Avenue during weekday rush hours and middays. Weekday evening and weekend daytime service would be extended beyond 168th Street and would originate and terminate at 207th Street, and overnight service would be extended beyond Euclid Avenue and would originate and terminate at Mott Avenue in Queens. This service change would have been implemented in October 1991, pending approval from the MTA board.

On October 23, 1992, rush hour C service was cut back from Rockaway Park–Beach 116th Street to Euclid Avenue. The 1992 change introduced five A trips in each direction run from 59th Street–Columbus Circle to Rockaway Park during rush hours, with the Rockaway Park Shuttle (renamed from H to S) operating between Broad Channel and Rockaway Park at all times.

On May 29, 1994, weekend service between 7 a.m. and 11 p.m. was extended to Washington Heights–168th Street (effectively recreating the old AA) to allow A trains to run express. Beginning April 30, 1995, C service was extended to 168th Street during middays as construction on the Manhattan Bridge cut B service from Manhattan. On November 11, 1995, midday service was cut back to 145th Street after B service to 168th Street was restored.

The B and the C, which both made all stops along Central Park West, switched northern terminals on March 1, 1998, ending the connection between the C and the Bronx. Instead of alternating between three different terminals depending on the time of day, all C service now terminated at 168th Street. The change was made to reduce crowding on the C and to reduce passenger confusion about the C's route.

On May 1, 1999, weekday evening and weekend daytime C service was rerouted south of Canal Street and originated and terminated at Euclid Avenue, the same southern terminal as weekday rush hour and midday service. The 1999 change allowed the C to make all stops in Brooklyn every day during daytime hours, which in turn allowed A trains to make express stops in Brooklyn at the same time. This service change was made due to construction taking place on the Williamsburg Bridge, which prohibited J, M, and Z trains from operating in Manhattan; as a result, service on the C, as well as the A and L trains were increased. This service change to the C was made permanent after the Williamsburg Bridge reopened to J, M, and Z trains.

=== 2000s to present ===
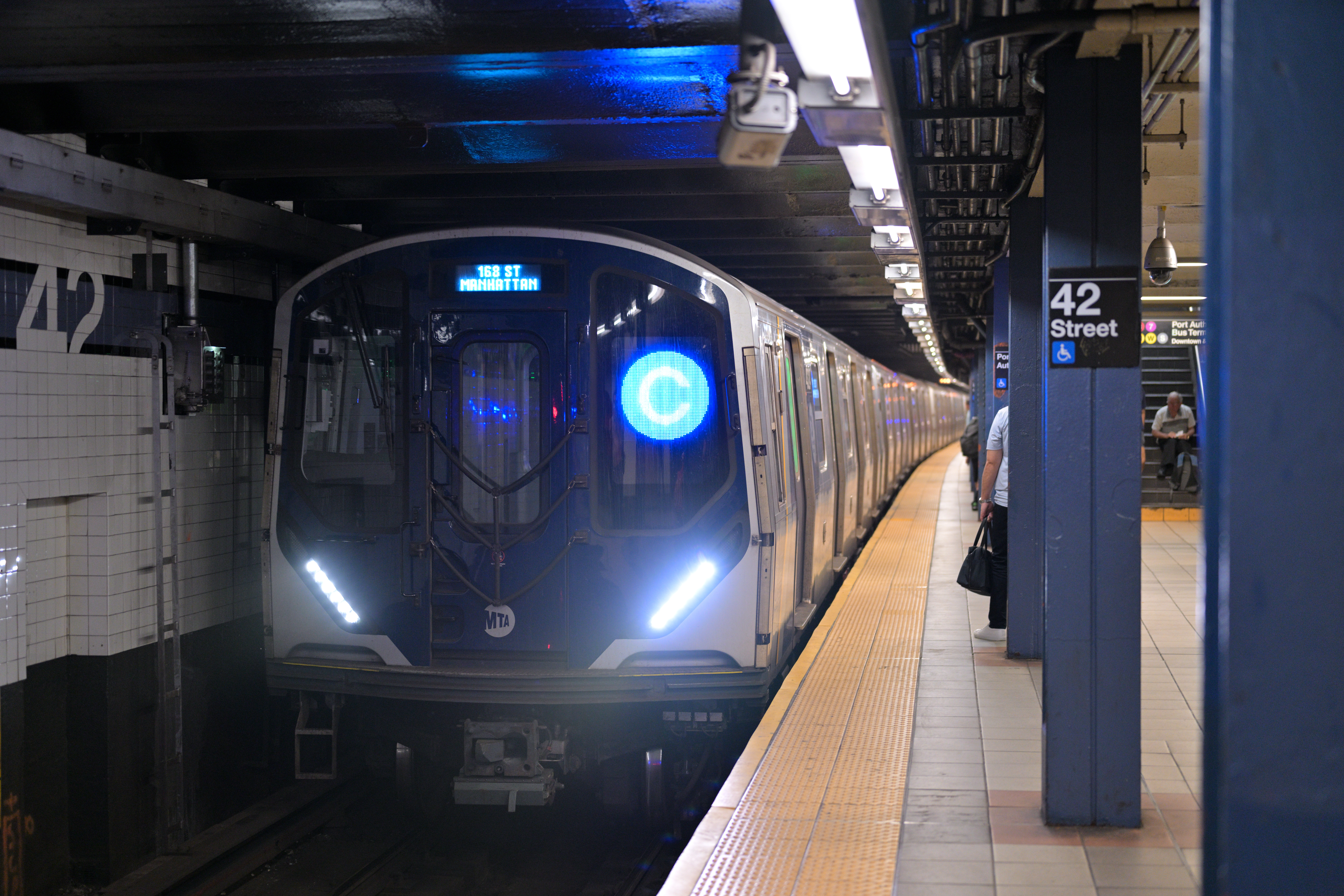
A 168th Street-bound R211A C train at 42nd Street–Port Authority Bus Terminal

C service was suspended from January 29 to February 14, 2000 due to switch replacement work north of the World Trade Center station, preventing it from being used as a terminal for E trains. The E was rerouted south of Canal Street and originated and terminated at Euclid Avenue in Brooklyn every day during daytime hours to replace C trains; overnight E service short turned at Canal Street and did not operate to or from Euclid Avenue. Weekday daytime service between 168th and 145 Streets as well as weekday evening service between 145th and 59th Streets was replaced by A trains. B trains were extended beyond 145th Street during weekend daytime hours and originated and terminated at 168th Street. Rush hour frequencies on the B was increased since it was the only subway train making all stops along Central Park West at the time.

After the September 11, 2001 attacks, C service was suspended and was replaced by A, B, and D trains in Manhattan and by E trains in Brooklyn, which was rerouted south of Canal Street and originated and terminated at Euclid Avenue. Normal service was restored on September 24, but trains bypassed Chambers Street until October 5.

On January 23, 2005, a fire at the Chambers Street signal room crippled A and C service. C service was suspended until February 2 and was replaced by the A, B, D, E, and V along different parts of its route. Initial assessments suggested that it would take several years to restore normal service, but the damaged equipment was replaced with available spare parts, allowing normal service to resume on April 21.

In August 2012, the Straphangers Campaign rated the C train the worst of the city's subway services for the fourth straight year. No other service had ranked worst for more than three years in a row. The group found that the C performed worst in three of the six categories in its annual State of the Subways Report Card: amount of scheduled service, interior cleanliness, and breakdown rate. It also ranked next-to-worst in car announcement quality, after the 7, but performed above average in regularity of service and crowding. The New York Times called the C the "least loved of New York City subway lines", citing its fleet of R32s, which were almost 50 years old at the time the Times reported on the issue. The New York Times has also stated that the C train "rattled and clanked along the deteriorating maze of tracks beneath the city, tin-clad markers of years of neglect." In 2017, the Times referred to the R32s on the C as the world's oldest subway cars "in continuous daily operation".

In 2011, problems with the R32s were at a peak as the fleet's failure rate was rising steadily. The next year, money was directed to replace the R32s with the R179s. At the time, all trains on the C were only 480 feet (146 m) long, shorter than on most other B Division routes. During summer 2010, some 600-foot-long R44 trains ran on the C, displacing some R32s, whose air conditioning units were repaired. In the summers of 2011 and 2012, some 600-foot-long R46 trains were used on the C, while the R32s were used on the A, which has a long outdoor section, though only one-third of the A's route is outdoor. In the summers of 2013 and 2014 as well as from May 2015 to February 2019, some 480-foot-long R160As ran on the C, while some R32s were used on the mostly-outdoor J/Z. In late 2017, after several failed proposals to permanently lengthen C trains as ridership increased, some 600-foot-long R46 trains were reassigned to the C, displacing some more R32s to the A. The R160As were displaced back to East New York Yard by February 2019, after the first R179 cars were delivered the previous November. The R179s periodically experienced major mechanical and technical issues in 2020, forcing the MTA to temporarily remove them from service. The R32s were formally retired in early January 2022.

From March 29, 2020, to April 29, 2020, C trains were suspended due to the COVID-19 pandemic in New York City, and A trains to Lefferts Boulevard ran local in their place. The cutbacks meant that wait times during rush hours increased from 8 to 12 minutes. In March 2021, TWU 100, the union for subway workers, sued the MTA in order to prevent the reduced frequencies from being permanent. That same month, the MTA decided to bring back full C service; full service was restored in mid-2021. Service frequencies on the C were increased after the New York state government provided funding for the changes in mid-2023. On August 7 of that year, midday service was increased to run every eight minutes instead of every ten minutes. There was supposed to be another service increase during the evening starting in December 2023, but as of February 2024, this service increase has not happened.

== Fleet ==
As of 2025, the C train's fleet typically consists of R179s and R211s. Since the 2020s, the C route has used both 480-foot-long (146 m) and 600-foot-long (183 m) trains, the former with eight cars each and the latter with ten cars each. The C's fleet is divided roughly evenly between eight-car trains of R179s, each arranged in two four-car sets, and ten-car trains of R211s, each arranged in two five-car sets. The 480-foot (150 m) train lengths are partially because, in the 2010s, the route's ridership did not meet NYC Transit's Rapid Transit Loading Guideline. This contrasted with trains on the rest of the mainline B Division (except for the Eastern Division and the G train), which are 600 feet (183 m) long.

R211T trains with open gangways began running on the C in February 2024, though these were moved to the G in March 2025. The R268 fleet, which is planned to be built in the late 2020s, will include four-car sets specifically for use on the C route. The R268s would displace the R211s on the C route, allowing the C to run eight-car trains exclusively.

== Route ==
=== Signage history ===
C service

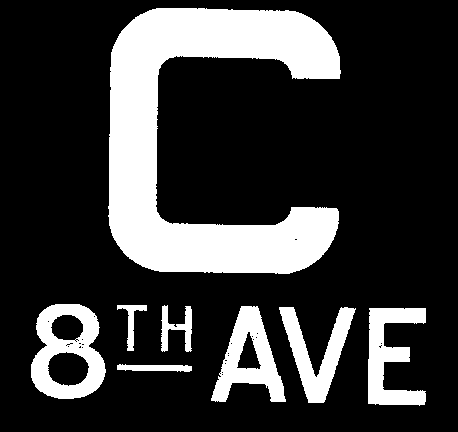
The C express service bullet used until 1949. Post 1985, R10s mainly used this sign

1985-1987 Rush hour bullet

1987-1988 Rush hour bullet

The current bullet used since 1988
CC service

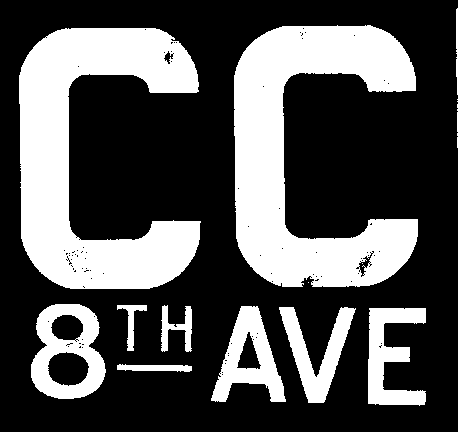
Pre-1967 bullet used on the R1s to R38s

1967-1979 bullet

1979-1985 bullet

1979-1985 Rush hour bullet

=== Service pattern ===
The following table shows the lines used by the C:

Line	From	To	Tracks
IND Eighth Avenue Line	168th Street	Canal Street	local
IND Eighth Avenue Line	Chambers Street	High Street	all
IND Fulton Street Line	Jay Street–MetroTech	Euclid Avenue	local

=== Stations ===
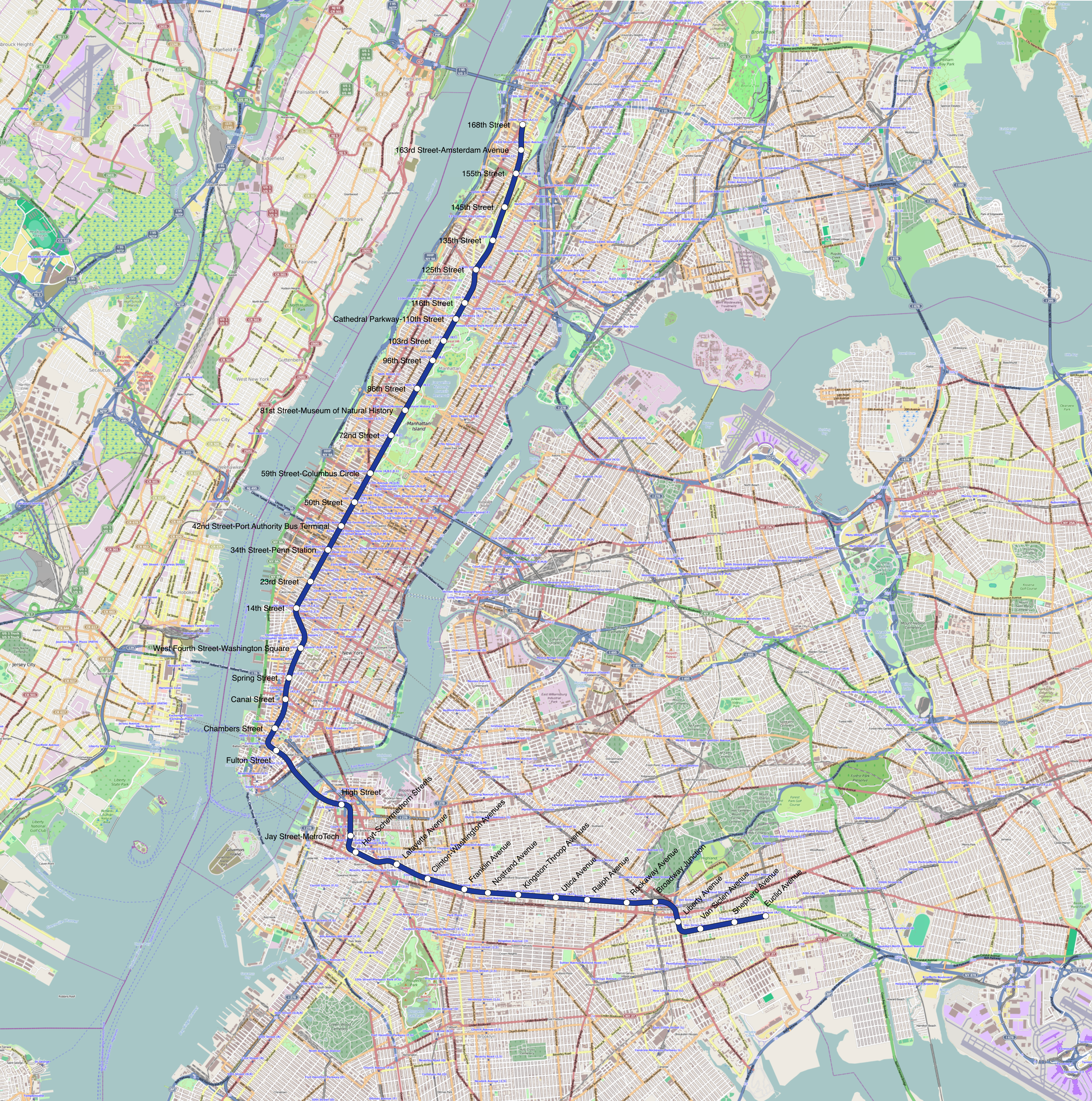
To scale line map

For a more detailed station listing, see the articles on the lines listed above. In case of severe winter weather, C service is suspended and replaced by the A.

Station service legend
Stops all times	Stops 24 hours a day
Stops all times except late nights	Stops every day during daytime hours only
Stops weekdays during the day	Stops during weekday daytime hours only
Station closed	Station closed
Stops rush hours only	Stops rush hours only (limited service)
Stops rush hours in the peak direction only	Stops rush hours/weekdays in the peak direction only
Time period details
Disabled access	Station is compliant with the Americans with Disabilities Act
↑	Station is compliant with the Americans with Disabilities Act in the indicated direction only
↓	Station is compliant with the Americans with Disabilities Act in the indicated direction only
	Elevator access to mezzanine only

C service	Stations	Disabled access	Subway transfers	Connections
Manhattan
Eighth Avenue Line
Stops all times except late nights	168th Street	Disabled access	A 1 (IRT Broadway–Seventh Avenue Line)	
Stops all times except late nights	163rd Street–Amsterdam Avenue			
Stops all times except late nights	155th Street			Bx6 Select Bus Service
Stops all times except late nights	145th Street		A B D (IND Concourse Line)	
Stops all times except late nights	135th Street		B	
Stops all times except late nights	125th Street	Disabled access	A B D	M60 Select Bus Service to LaGuardia Airport
Stops all times except late nights	116th Street		B	
Stops all times except late nights	Cathedral Parkway–110th Street		B	
Stops all times except late nights	103rd Street		B	
Stops all times except late nights	96th Street		B	
Stops all times except late nights	86th Street		B	M86 Select Bus Service
Stops all times except late nights	81st Street–Museum of Natural History		B	M79 Select Bus Service
Stops all times except late nights	72nd Street		B	
Stops all times except late nights	59th Street–Columbus Circle	Disabled access	A B D 1 (IRT Broadway–Seventh Avenue Line)	
Stops all times except late nights	50th Street	↓	E (IND Queens Boulevard Line)	Station is ADA-accessible in the southbound direction only.
Stops all times except late nights	42nd Street–Port Authority Bus Terminal	Disabled access	A E 1 2 3 (IRT Broadway–Seventh Avenue Line); 7 <7> (IRT Flushing Line); N Q R W (BMT Broadway Line); S (42nd Street Shuttle) at Times Square; B D F <F> M (IND Sixth Avenue Line at 42nd Street–Bryant Park, daytime only)	Port Authority Bus Terminal; M34A Select Bus Service
Stops all times except late nights	34th Street–Penn Station	Disabled access	A E	M34 / M34A Select Bus Service; Amtrak, LIRR, NJ Transit at Pennsylvania Station
Stops all times except late nights	23rd Street		E	M23 Select Bus Service
Stops all times except late nights	14th Street	Disabled access	A E L (BMT Canarsie Line at Eighth Avenue)	M14A/D Select Bus Service
Stops all times except late nights	West Fourth Street–Washington Square	Disabled access	A E B D F <F> M (IND Sixth Avenue Line)	PATH at Ninth Street
Stops all times except late nights	Spring Street	↓	E	Station is ADA-accessible in the southbound direction only.
Stops all times except late nights	Canal Street		A E	
Stops all times except late nights	Chambers Street	Elevator access to mezzanine only	A E (at World Trade Center) (Note: Chambers Street–World Trade Center are actually counted as two separate stations by the MTA. E trains terminate at World Trade Center while A and C trains have through service at Chambers Street.); 2 3 (IRT Broadway–Seventh Avenue Line at Park Place); R W (BMT Broadway Line at Cortlandt Street)	PATH at World Trade Center
Stops all times except late nights	Fulton Street	Disabled access	A 2 3 (IRT Broadway–Seventh Avenue Line); 4 5 (IRT Lexington Avenue Line); J Z (BMT Nassau Street Line)	PATH at World Trade Center
Brooklyn
Stops all times except late nights	High Street		A	NYC Ferry: East River and South Brooklyn routes (at Old Fulton Street and Furman Street)
Fulton Street Line
Stops all times except late nights	Jay Street–MetroTech	Disabled access	A F <F> R W (BMT Fourth Avenue Line)	
Stops all times except late nights	Hoyt–Schermerhorn Streets	Elevator access to mezzanine only	A G (IND Crosstown Line)	
Stops all times except late nights	Lafayette Avenue			
Stops all times except late nights	Clinton–Washington Avenues			
Stops all times except late nights	Franklin Avenue	Disabled access	S (BMT Franklin Avenue Line)	
Stops all times except late nights	Nostrand Avenue		A	B44 Select Bus Service, LIRR Atlantic Branch at Nostrand Avenue
Stops all times except late nights	Kingston–Throop Avenues			B15 bus to JFK Int'l Airport
Stops all times except late nights	Utica Avenue	Disabled access	A	B46 Select Bus Service
Stops all times except late nights	Ralph Avenue			
Stops all times except late nights	Rockaway Avenue			
Stops all times except late nights	Broadway Junction		A J Z (BMT Jamaica Line); L (BMT Canarsie Line)	
Stops all times except late nights	Liberty Avenue			
Stops all times except late nights	Van Siclen Avenue			
Stops all times except late nights	Shepherd Avenue			
Stops all times except late nights	Euclid Avenue	Disabled access	A	
