= Rockaway Avenue station (IND Fulton Street Line) =

New York City Subway station in Brooklyn

Rockaway Avenue
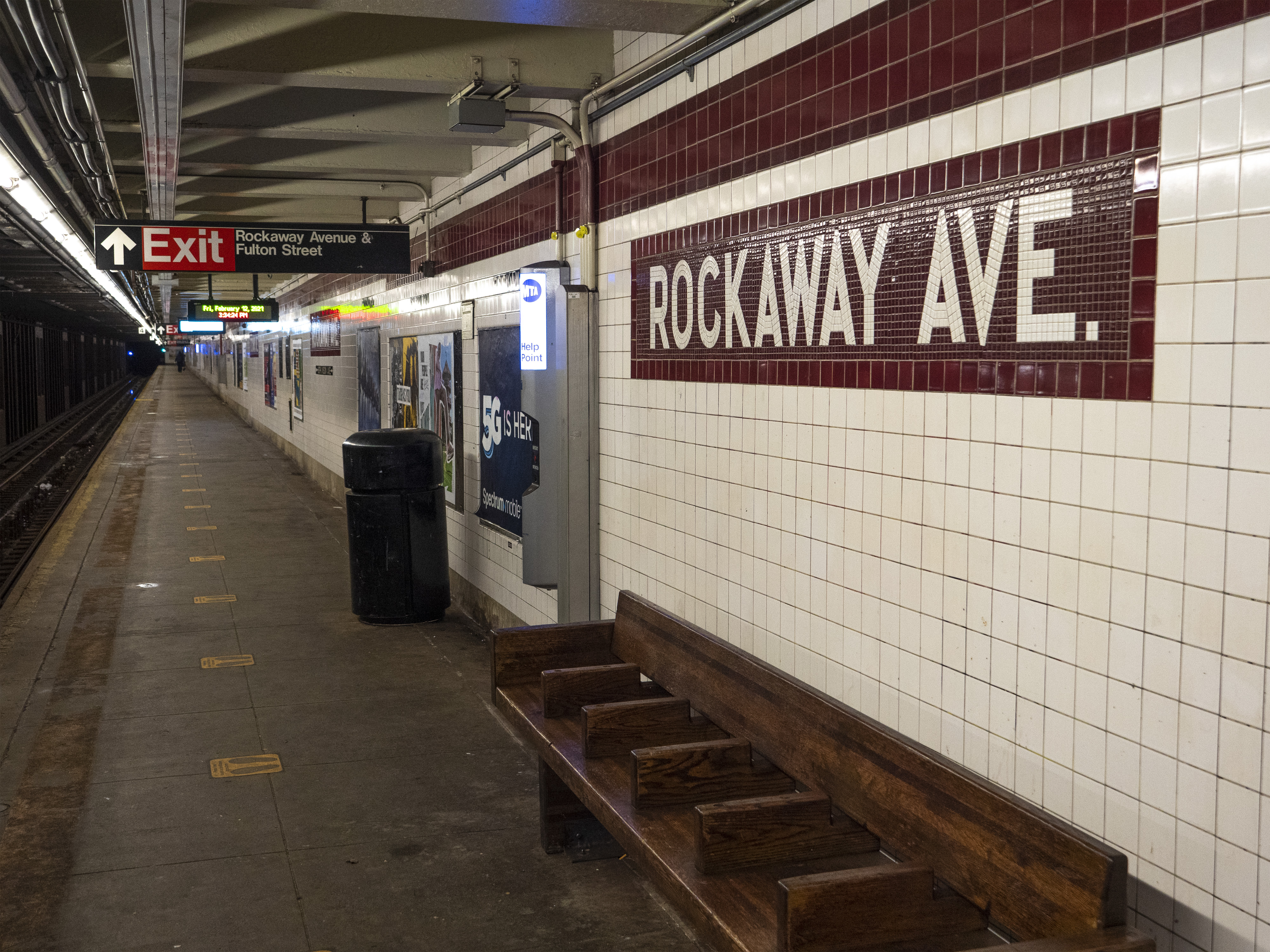
- Southbound platform

Station statistics
- Address: Rockaway Avenue & Fulton Street; Brooklyn, New York
- Borough: Brooklyn
- Locale: Bedford–Stuyvesant, Ocean Hill
- Coordinates: 40.67823°N 73.910823°W
- Division: B (IND)
- Line: IND Fulton Street Line
- Services: A (late nights); C (all except late nights)
- Transit: NYCT Bus: B7, B25, B60
- Structure: Underground
- Platforms: 2 side platforms
- Tracks: 4

Other information
- Opened: April 9, 1936; 90 years ago

Traffic
- 2025: 1,249,684 ▲5.8%
- Rank: 267 out of 423
Services
| Preceding station | New York City Subway | Following station |
|---|---|---|
| Ralph Avenue A C toward 168th Street | Local | Broadway Junction A C toward Euclid Avenue |
Location
Location within New York City Subway
Location within New York City
Location within New York
Track layout
Street map
Station service legend
| Symbol | Description |
| Stops all times except late nights | Stops all times except late nights |
| Stops late nights only | Stops late nights only |

The Rockaway Avenue station is a local station on the IND Fulton Street Line of the New York City Subway. Located at the intersection of Rockaway Avenue and Fulton Street in Brooklyn, it is served by the C train at all times except late nights, when the A train takes over service.

== History ==
When it opened on April 9, 1936, Rockaway Avenue was the terminal for IND Fulton Street Line. During this time, there was a diamond crossover between the express tracks north of the station, and trains stub ended here. Between the express and local tracks in the area of the crossover were extra columns to support the subway ceiling to make up for the lack of columns that would have been between the express tracks, which were not built due to the installation of the crossover. The crossover switches were controlled from a tower at Utica Avenue. The outlines of the now painted-out crossovers and signals can still be seen. The levers are also still in place on the machine, but are now painted yellow and are no longer used. Meanwhile, at the nine-car stop marker on the southbound local track, there is a short section of ballasted type 1 track on both express tracks where the bumper blocks were located; when Broadway Junction opened, the temporary wooden platform extension was removed from the northbound local track only. Southbound trains continued on the express track south of Utica Avenue to the diamond crossover between the express tracks north of Broadway Junction. Trains then used this crossover to cross to the northbound express track (and another crossover to get to the local one). They then returned to either northbound track at Broadway Junction to resume service to Manhattan.

Construction on the Fulton Street Line east of Rockaway Avenue was halted in 1942 due to World War II restrictions on materials. The entire tunnel infrastructure east of Euclid Avenue, including the Pitkin Yard and the yard leads, was completed, but rails and signals were not installed and Broadway Junction only had its tile completed. The tile work there is the last of the old style; tile work at the stations east is of a more modern type. Track and signals were completed into Broadway Junction in 1946 and to Euclid Avenue two years later.

== Station layout ==
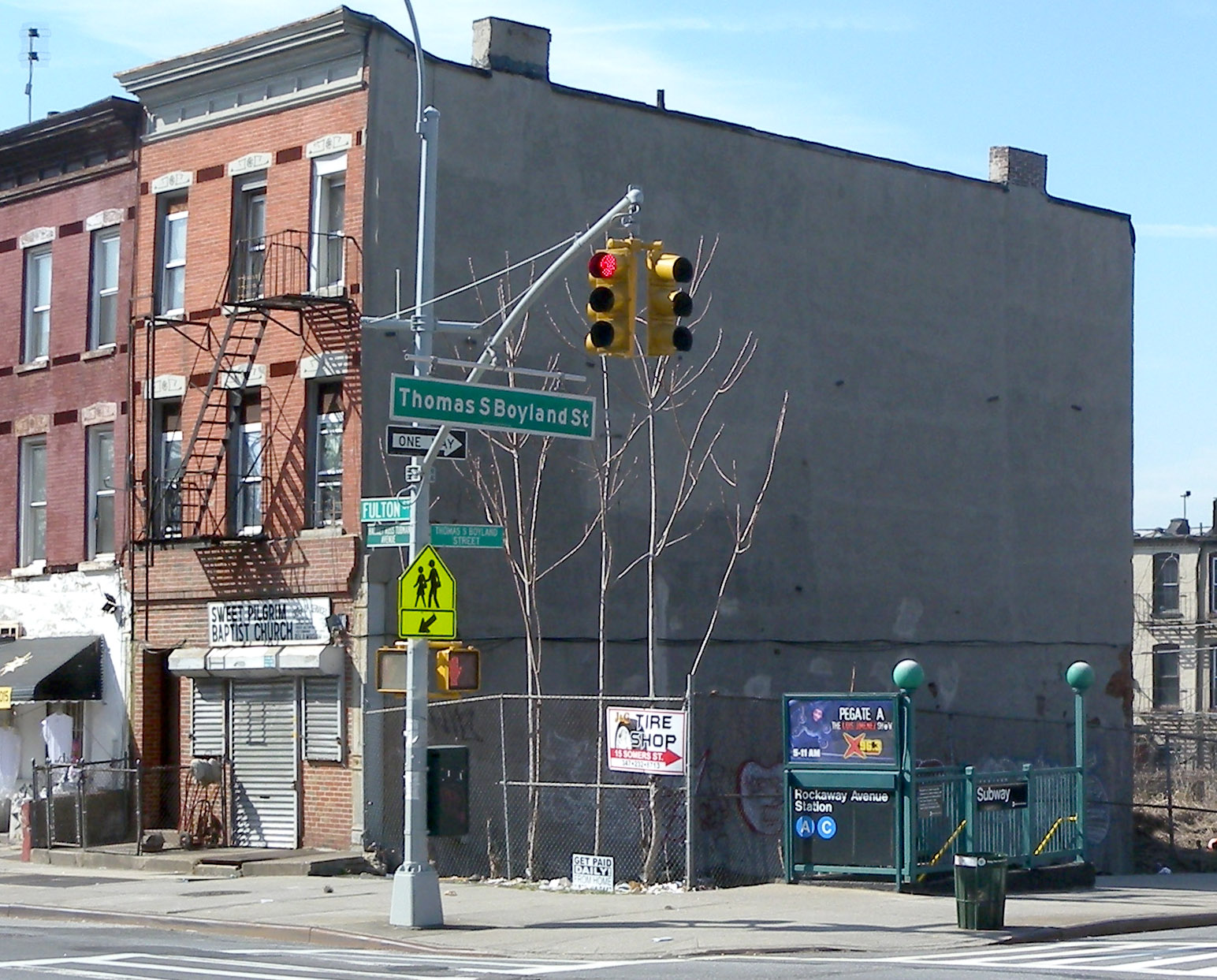
Thomas S. Boyland Street stair

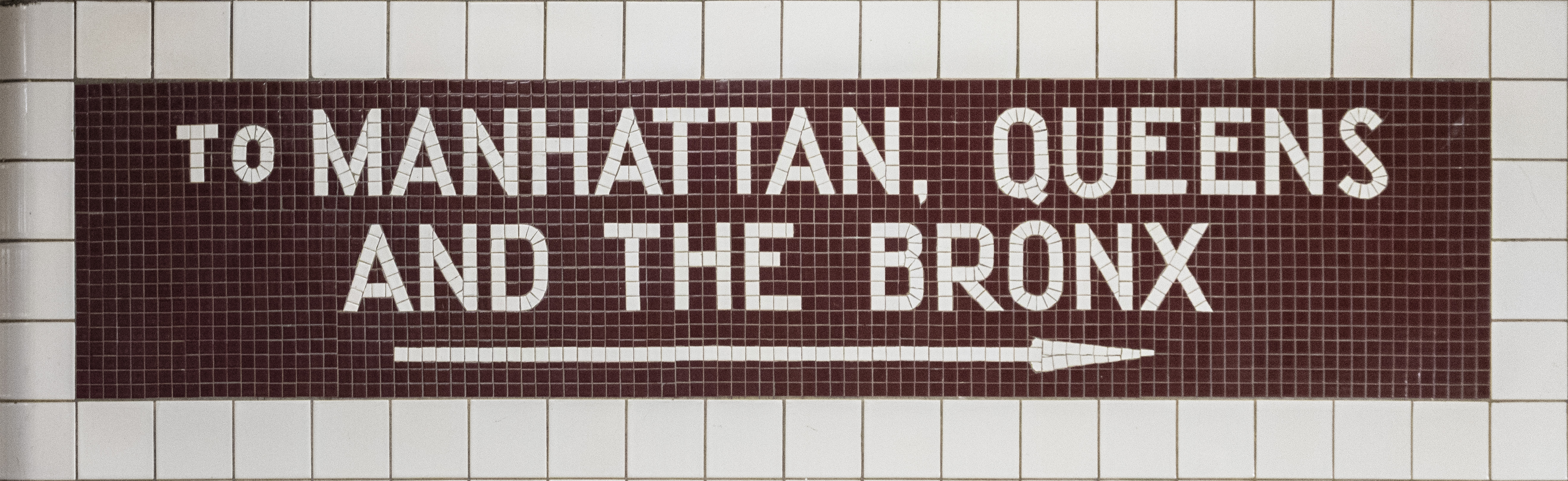
Directional mosaic on the mezzanine level

This is a four-track station with two side platforms. Both platforms have a maroon trim line with a deep maroon border and mosaic name plates reading "ROCKAWAY AVE." in white sans-serif lettering on a deep maroon background and maroon border. Small tile captions reading "ROCKAWAY" in white lettering on a black background run below the trim line, and directional signs in the same style are present below some of the name tablets. On the mezzanine level, directional mosaics point towards the platforms. Both platforms are column-less except near the fare control areas, where they are painted maroon.

=== Exits ===
The station has three exits. The full-time one is at the west (railroad north) end of the platforms. This exit has two staircases on either side of Fulton Street at Hopkinson Avenue or Thomas S. Boyland Street that lead to a small mezzanine. There is one staircase to each platform here, and transfers between directions are allowed.

The other exits at the other side of the station are at platform level and unstaffed. They both have two street staircases that lead to Rockaway Avenue, but the one on the Euclid Avenue-bound platform is exit-only, containing one full-height turnstile, while the one on the Manhattan-bound platform has two high entry/exit turnstiles and one exit-only turnstile.
