= Independent Subway System =

Defunct subway operator in New York City

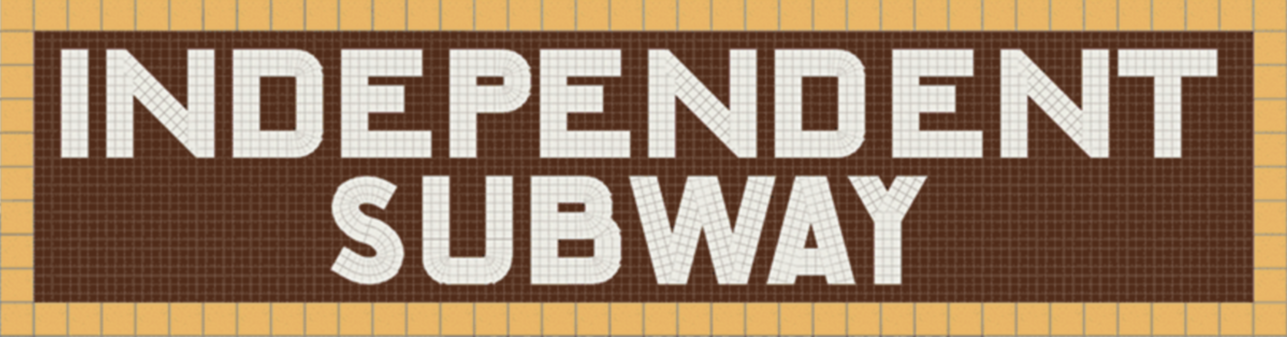

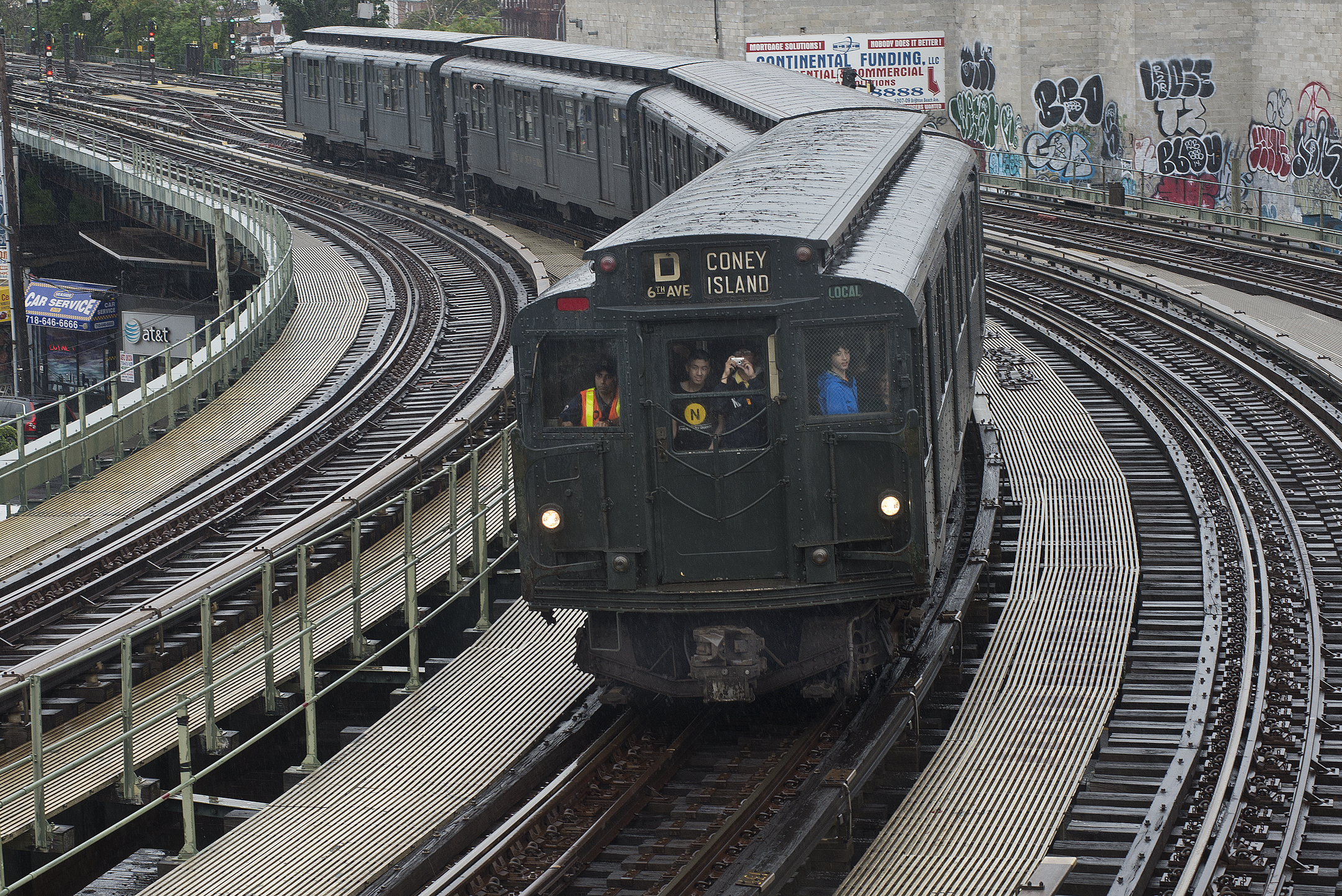
- A New York Transit Museum excursion train set of R1–9 fleet cars

Overview
- Status: Incorporated into the New York City Subway
- Owner: City of New York

Service
- Operator: New York City Transit Authority
- Depot(s): Concourse Yard, Jamaica Yard, Pitkin Yard, 207th Street Yard
- Rolling stock: R46, R68, R68A, R160, R179, R211

History
- Opened: 1932; 94 years ago
- Closed: 1940; 86 years ago (acquisition by the NYC Board of Transportation)

Technical
- Track gauge: 4 ft 8 1/2 in (1,435 mm) standard gauge
Route map
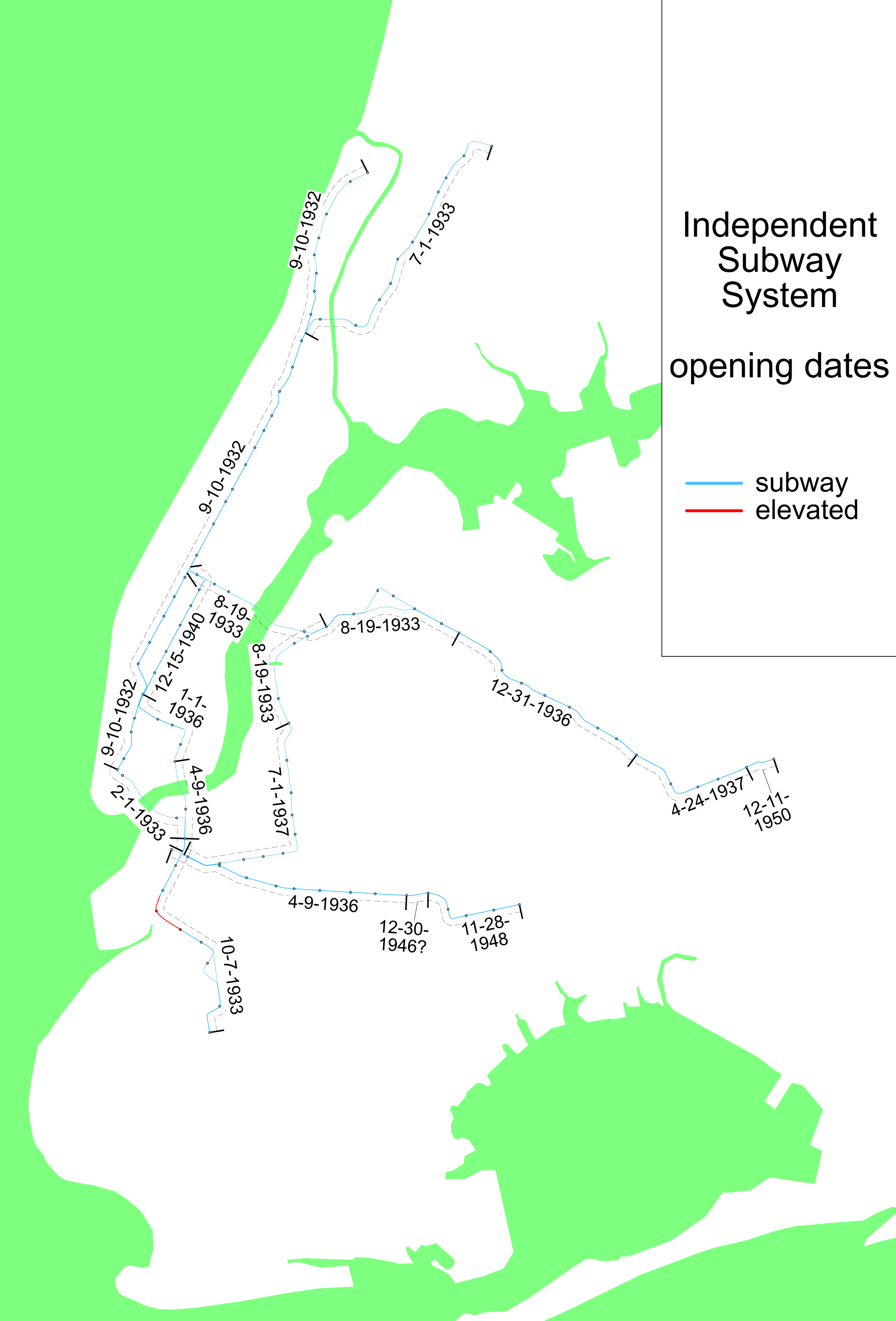
The sections of the IND and the date each was opened.

The Independent Subway System (IND; formerly the ISS (Note: The Independent Subway System mostly uses the IND initialism. The ISS initialism was primarily used prior to unification of the New York City Subway in 1940.)) was a rapid transit rail system in New York City that is now part of the New York City Subway. It was first constructed as the Eighth Avenue Line in Manhattan in 1932. It was originally also known as the Independent City-Owned Subway System (ICOSS) or the Independent City-Owned Rapid Transit Railroad (ICORTR).

One of three subway networks that became part of the modern New York City Subway, the IND was intended to be fully owned and operated by the municipal government, in contrast to the privately operated or jointly funded Interborough Rapid Transit Company (IRT) and Brooklyn–Manhattan Transit Corporation (BMT) companies. It was merged with these two networks when the subway system was unified in 1940.

The original IND services are the modern subway's A, C, E, F, and G services, as well as the portions of the B and D services that are not in Brooklyn. In addition, the BMT's M and R use trackage that was originally built for the IND, while the Q uses the IND Second Avenue Line, which was built after the unification of the three systems. The Rockaway Park Shuttle supplements the A service. For operational purposes, the IND and BMT lines and services are referred to jointly as the B Division.

== Nomenclature ==
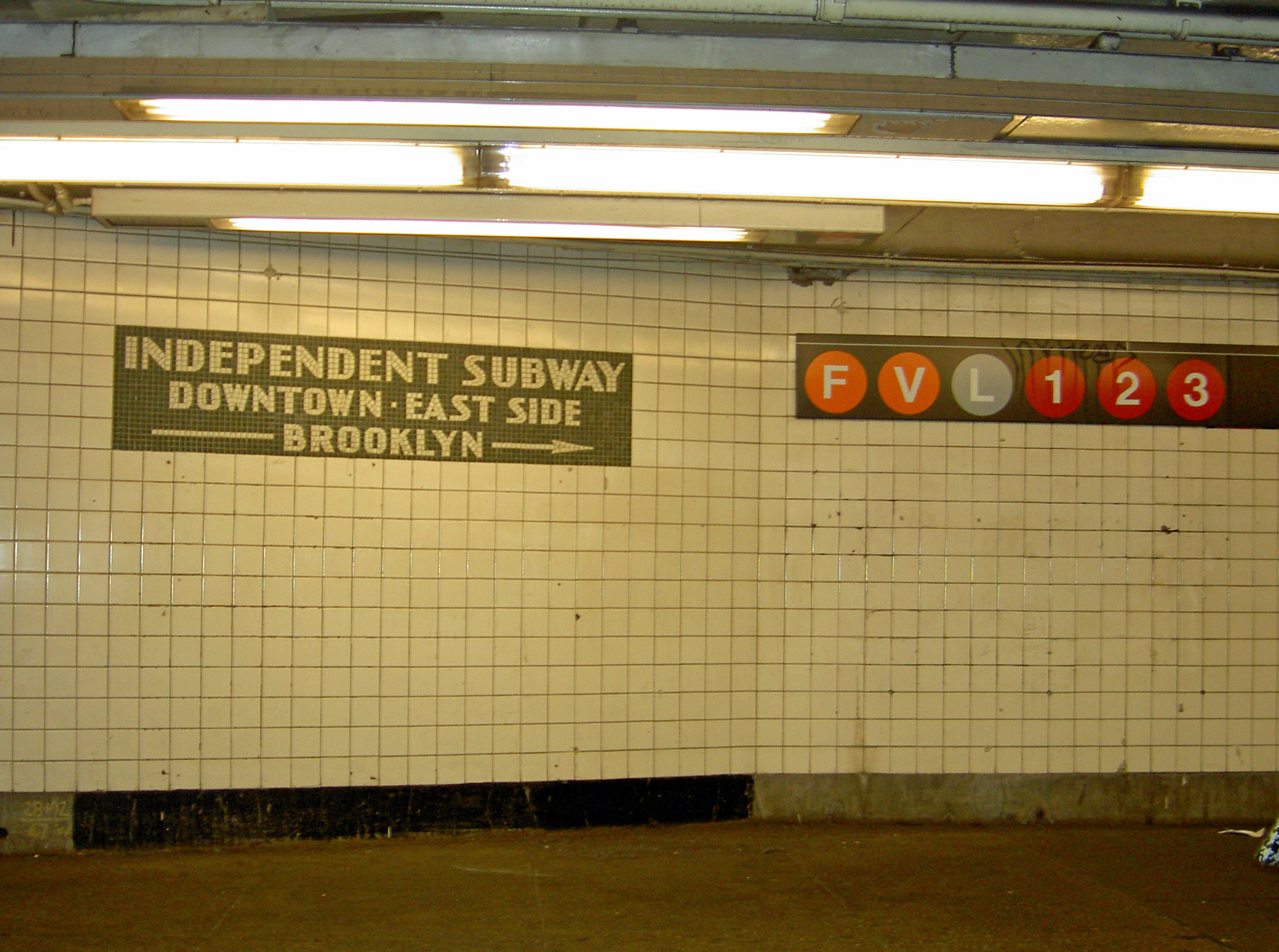
Independent Subway mosaics sign at 14th Street station on the Sixth Avenue Line, before V train service at this station was replaced by M train service

Until 1940, it was known as the Independent City-Owned Subway System (ICOS), Independent Subway System (ISS), or Independent City-Owned Rapid Transit Railroad. It became known as the IND after unification of the subway lines in 1940; the name IND was assigned to match the three-letter initialisms that the IRT and BMT used.

The first IND line was the Eighth Avenue Line in Manhattan, opened on September 10, 1932; for a while the whole system was colloquially known as the Eighth Avenue Subway. The original IND system was entirely underground in the four boroughs that it served, with the exception of a short section of the IND Culver Line containing two stations spanning the Gowanus Canal in the Gowanus section of Brooklyn.

== History ==
In the early 1920s, Mayor John Hylan proposed a complex series of city-owned and operated rapid transit lines to compete with the BMT and IRT, especially their elevated lines. The New York City Transit Commission was formed in 1921 to develop a plan to reduce overcrowding on the subways. The original plans included:

- Two major trunk lines in midtown Manhattan, with one running under Eighth Avenue and one under Sixth Avenue, which already had an elevated line
- A crosstown subway under 53rd Street (connecting with the Eighth and Sixth Avenue subways) running under the East River to Queens Plaza (Long Island City), meeting with a Brooklyn–Queens crosstown line, and continuing under Queens Boulevard and Hillside Avenue to 179th Street, where bus service would converge
- A subway under the Grand Concourse in the Bronx, diverging from the Eighth Avenue Line in Manhattan at 145th Street and Saint Nicholas Avenue

These lines were completely built as planned. All but a short portion of the Culver Line (over the Gowanus Canal) are underground.

On March 14, 1925, the groundbreaking of the Eighth Avenue subway took place at 123rd Street and St. Nicholas Avenue.

On July 8, 1931, the first train of R1s left Coney Island at 11:35am and ran via the BMT Sea Beach Line to Times Square. The trip took 42 minutes.

=== Opening and progress through 1933 ===
==== First Manhattan trunk line, 1932 ====
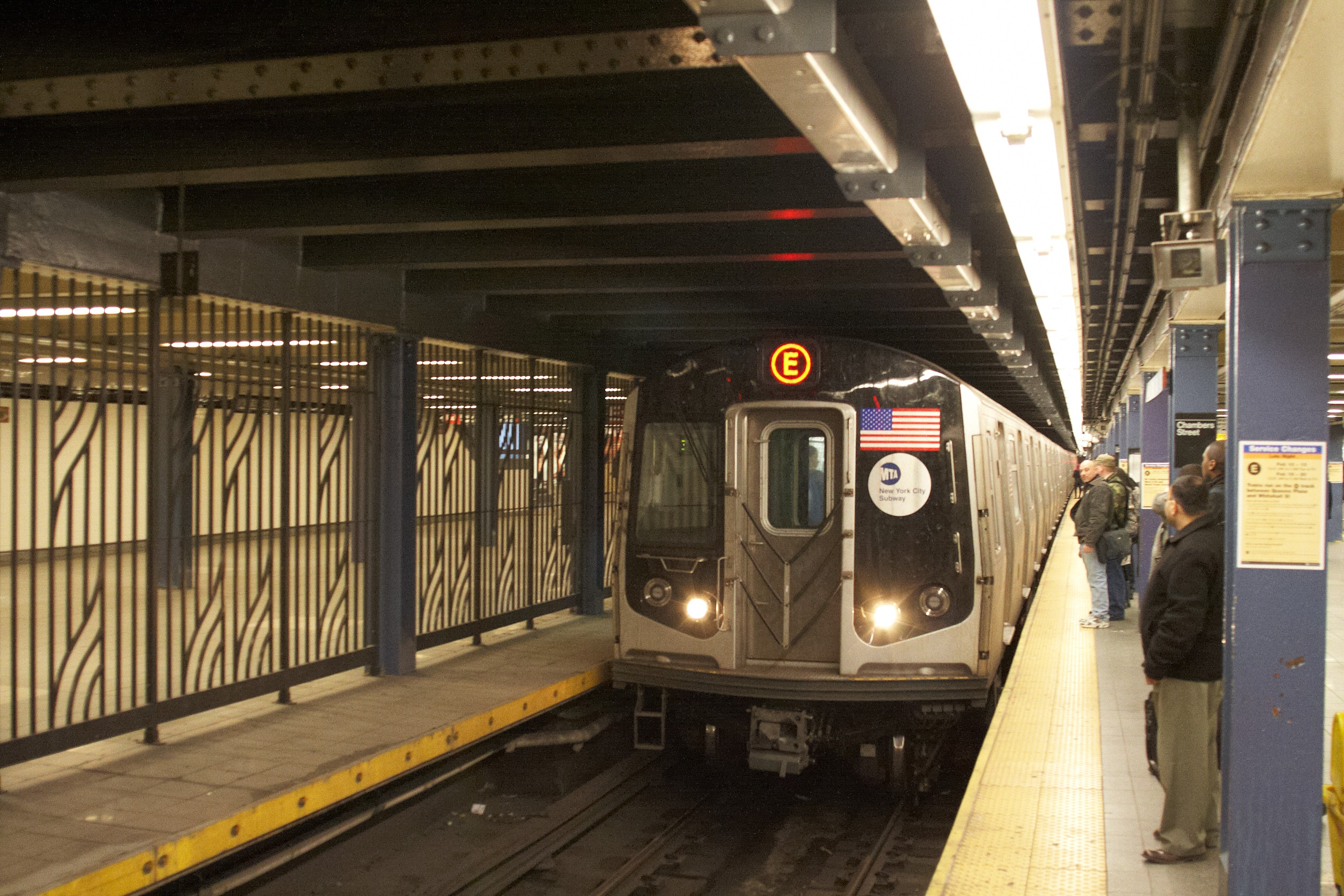
World Trade Center station

On September 10, 1932, the Eighth Avenue Line opened from 207th Street to Chambers Street, inaugurating the IND. In February 1933 the Cranberry Street Tunnel opened, along with the Eighth Avenue Line from Chambers Street to Jay Street–Borough Hall. On the northern end of the construction, in the Bronx, the connecting Concourse Line opened on July 1, 1933 from 205th Street to 145th Street. On the IND's opening day, it had a relatively small subway car fleet of 300 cars, while the IRT had 2,281 subway and 1,694 elevated cars, and the BMT had 2,472 cars.

The new IND Eighth Avenue Line was built using 1,000,000 cubic yards (27,000,000 ft^{3}) of concrete and 150,000 short tons (140,000,000 kg) of steel. The roadbed of the new subway was expected to last 30 years. At the time of the line's opening, other portions of the Independent Subway System were under construction, including five underwater tunnels:

- Cranberry Street Tunnel, 8,487 feet (2,587 m) long
- Rutgers Street Tunnel, 5,479 feet (1,670 m) long
- 53rd Street Tunnel, 5,589 feet (1,704 m) long
- Concourse Tunnel, 5,397 feet (1,645 m) long
- Greenpoint Tube, 4,790 feet (1,460 m) long

There was some vandalism on the IND Eighth Avenue Line's opening day, as some of the uptown stations were broken into by people who clogged turnstile slots with gum and other objects. Two months after the IND opened for business, three exits from the 96th Street and 103rd Street stations – at 95th and 97th Streets and at 105th Street, respectively – were closed due to theft.

==== First branch lines ====
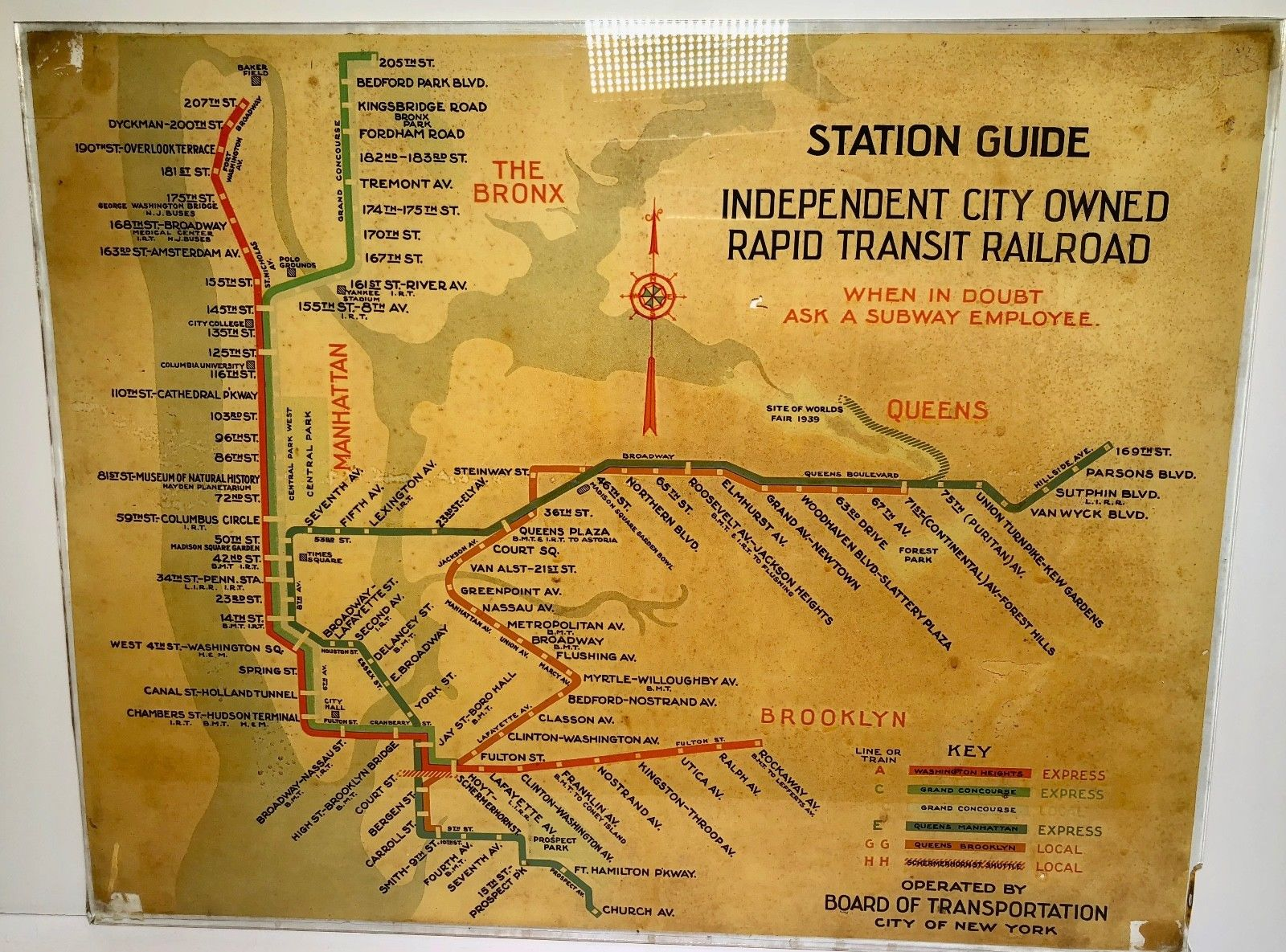
A map of the IND system, 1939.

The Queens Boulevard Line, also referred to as the Long Island City−Jamaica Line, Fifty-third Street−Jamaica Line, and Queens Boulevard−Jamaica Line prior to opening, was an original line of the city-owned Independent Subway System (IND), planned to stretch between the IND Eighth Avenue Line in Manhattan and 178th Street and Hillside Avenue in Jamaica, Queens.

The first section of the line, west from Roosevelt Avenue to 50th Street, opened on August 19, 1933. E trains ran local to Hudson Terminal (today's World Trade Center) in Manhattan, while the GG (predecessor to current G service) ran as a shuttle service between Queens Plaza and Nassau Avenue on the IND Crosstown Line, which opened on the same day.

The Cranberry Street Tunnel, extending the Eighth Avenue express tracks east under Fulton Street to Jay Street–Borough Hall in Brooklyn, was opened for the morning rush hour on February 1, 1933. Until June 24, 1933, High Street was skipped.

The first short section of the IND Culver Line opened on March 20, 1933, taking Eighth Avenue Express A trains (and for about a month from July to August C trains) south from Jay Street to Bergen Street. The rest of the line opened on October 7, 1933 to the "temporary" terminal at Church Avenue, three blocks away from the Culver elevated at Ditmas Avenue. In 1936, the A was rerouted to the IND Fulton Street Line and E trains from the Queens Boulevard Line replaced them.

=== Second Manhattan trunk line, 1936–1940 ===
The first part of the IND Sixth Avenue Line, or what was then known as the Houston–Essex Street Line, began operations at noon on January 1, 1936 with two local tracks from a junction with the Washington Heights, Eighth Avenue and Church Street Line (Eighth Avenue Line) south of West Fourth Street–Washington Square east under Houston Street and south under Essex Street to a temporary terminal at East Broadway. E trains, which ran from Jackson Heights, Queens to Hudson Terminal, were shifted to the new line to East Broadway. Two express tracks were built on the portion under Houston Street until Essex Street-Avenue A; the tracks were intended to travel under the East River and connect with the never-built IND Worth Street Line in Williamsburg, Brooklyn.

Just after midnight on April 9, 1936, trains began running under the East River via the Rutgers Street Tunnel, which connected the Houston-Essex Street Line with the north end of the Jay–Smith–Ninth Street Line at a junction with the Eighth Avenue Line north of Jay Street–Borough Hall. E trains were sent through the connection to Church Avenue. Simultaneously, the Fulton Street Line was opened to Rockaway Avenue and the A and C trains, which had used Smith Street, were rerouted to Fulton Street.

During construction, streetcar service along Sixth Avenue was terminated. The city had the choice of either restoring it upon the completion of construction or abandoning it immediately. As the city wanted to tear down the IRT Sixth Avenue Line right away and save on the costs of shoring it up while construction proceeded underneath it, the IRT Sixth Avenue Line was purchased for $12.5 million and terminated by the city on December 5, 1938.

On December 15, 1940, local subway service began on Sixth Avenue from the West Fourth Street subway station to the 47-50th Street subway station with track connections to the IND 53rd Street Line. The Sixth Avenue Line's construction cost $59,500,000. The following routes were added with the opening of service:

- The AA Washington Heights Local was brought back for non-rush-hour service between 168th Street and Hudson Terminal via the Eighth Avenue Line.
- The BB Washington Heights Local was added for rush-hour only service between 168th Street and Hudson Terminal via the Sixth Avenue Line.
- The D Bronx Concourse Express was added for service between Norwood–205th Street and Hudson Terminal via the Sixth Avenue Line.
- E (Queens–Manhattan Express) service was cut back from Church Avenue to Broadway–Lafayette Street.
- F (Queens–Manhattan Express) was added for service between Parsons Boulevard and Church Avenue via the Sixth Avenue Line.

Sixth Avenue express service would not begin until 1967, after the Chrystie Street Connection opened.

=== More branch lines open ===
The Fulton Street Line was opened from Jay Street to Rockaway Avenue on April 9, 1936, including the stub terminal at Court Street. A shuttle was operated between Court Street and Hoyt–Schermerhorn Streets.

On December 31, 1936, the Queens Boulevard Line was extended from Roosevelt Avenue to Kew Gardens–Union Turnpike.

The Queens Boulevard Line was extended to Hillside Avenue and 178th Street, with a terminal station at 169th Street on April 24, 1937. That day, express service began on the Queens Boulevard Line during rush hours, with E trains running express west of 71st–Continental Avenues, and GG trains taking over the local during rush hours. The initial headway for express service was between three and five minutes.

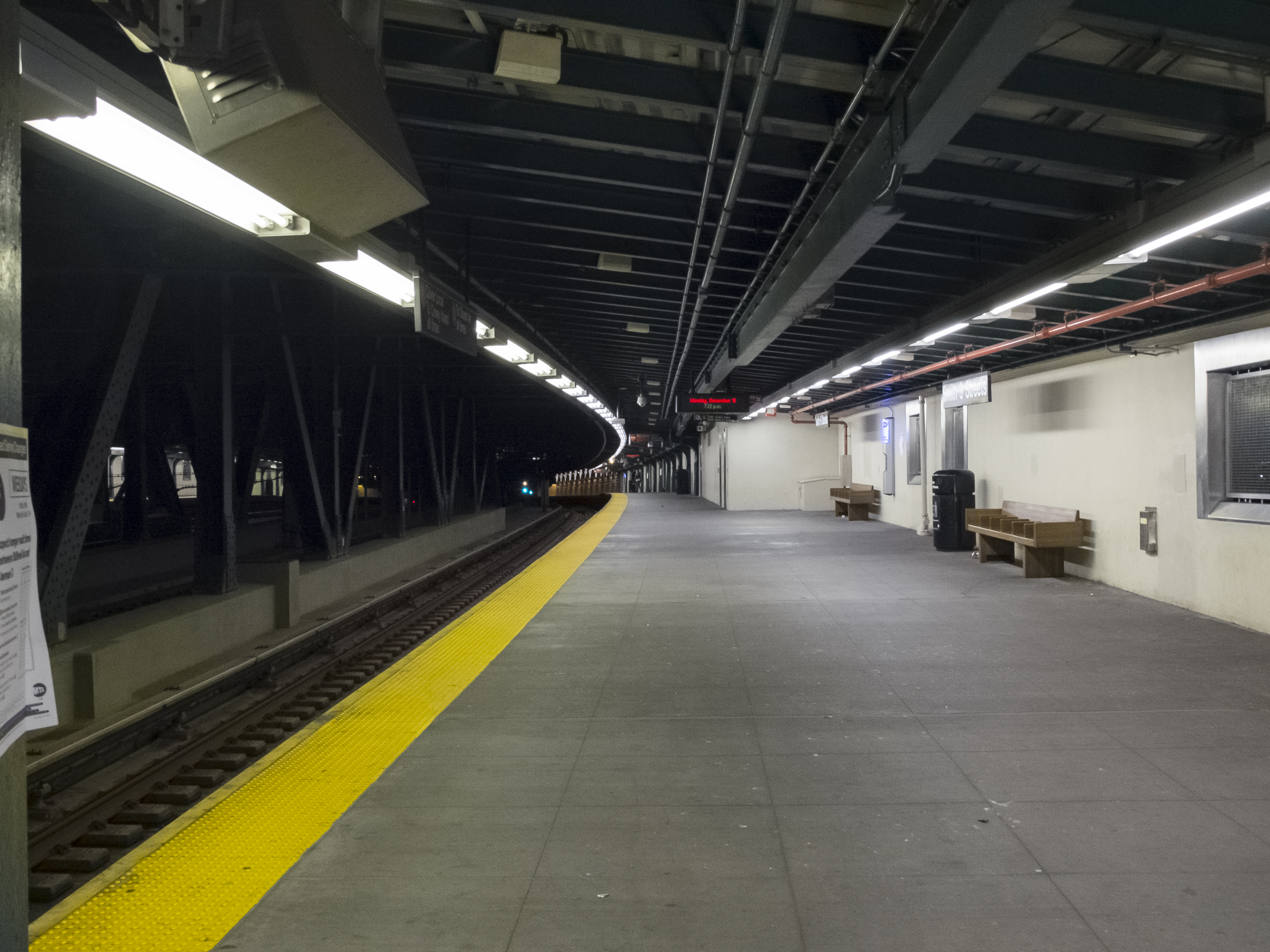
Smith–Ninth Streets

The entire Crosstown Line was completed and connected to the IND Culver Line on July 1, 1937, whereupon the GG was extended in both directions to Smith–Ninth Streets and Forest Hills–71st Avenue.

From April 30, 1939 to October 28, 1940, the Queens Boulevard Line served the 1939 New York World's Fair via the World's Fair Railroad. The World's Fair line ran via a connection through the Jamaica Yard and through Flushing Meadows–Corona Park along the current right-of-way of the Van Wyck Expressway. Despite calls from public officials such as Queens Borough President George Harvey to make the line a permanent connection to Flushing and northern Queens, the line was demolished in 1941.

=== Proposed expansion ===
Mayor John Hylan proposed some never-built lines in 1922 even before the first leg of the IND was completed. These lines included:

- A West Side trunk line in Manhattan between 14th Street and the city limits at Yonkers. The line would be 4 tracks between 14th Street and 162nd Street, 3 tracks to Dyckman Street, and 2 tracks to the terminal. There would be a two-track spur from 162nd Street to 190th Street via Amsterdam Avenue. From 14th Street, the line would split; two tracks would connect to the BMT Canarsie Line and two tracks would continue south to a loop at Battery Park and an East River tunnel to Atlantic Avenue and Hicks Street, Brooklyn. Supposedly, there was also a plan of a line to Red Hook.
- A trunk line, 4 tracks, on First Avenue from the Harlem River to 10th Street. From 10th Street, the line would split. Two tracks would run via Third Avenue and the Bowery to a new Lafayette Avenue subway in Brooklyn. The other two would run to a loop near City Hall. From the Harlem River, the line would run to 161st Street, and split into two 3-track routes: one to Fordham Road & Southern Blvd and the other to Webster Ave. & Fordham Road, where it would join the current IRT White Plains Road line and continue to 241st Street. Since this portion of the IRT El was already built to BMT clearances, and Hylan's system would consider using BMT clearances as well, all that would have to be done along this section is shave back the platforms.
- A line from 125th Street (near today's Henry Hudson Parkway) crosstown, to and across the East River, to Astoria, Queens, likely connecting to the BMT Astoria Line.
- A new subway line, with between two and four tracks at various areas, from approximately the Hunters Point Avenue station on today's IRT Flushing Line in Queens, heading in a southeasterly direction to Lafayette Avenue, Brooklyn. At Lafayette Avenue, the line would split. Two tracks would turn into a four-track line along Lafayette Avenue. The other two tracks would run to Flatbush and Franklin Avenues.
- A 4-track subway line from Brooklyn's Borough Hall via the Lafayette Avenue subway to Bedford Avenue. From there it was three tracks to Broadway to Cypress Hills, Brooklyn where the line would continue on the present-day BMT Jamaica Line. (The line would have ended at 168th Street, where the BMT Jamaica Line once ended.) The subway would have run directly under the line along Broadway giving it direct competition for passengers, and (in Hylan's opinion) draining revenues from the BMT. Two tracks of the Lafayette Avenue subway would connect with the proposed First Avenue line.
- A new branch off the IRT Eastern Parkway Line in Brooklyn onto Utica Avenue, running under Utica to Flatlands Avenue.
- A 4-track subway under Flatbush Avenue in Brooklyn to Nostrand Avenue, to Emmons Avenue in Sheepshead Bay, turning west onto Emmons Avenue to Surf Avenue in Coney Island. A branch of this line would head out to Floyd Bennett Field under Flatbush Avenue.
- Extension of the BMT Canarsie Line to the BMT Jamaica Line somewhere beyond 121st Street in Queens.
- A new line running from Prospect Avenue via Fort Hamilton Parkway, to 10th Avenue, terminating at 90th Street. BMT Culver Line trains would use this line.
- Extension of the BMT Fourth Avenue Line in Brooklyn, south to Bay Ridge – 95th Street. (This was the only other line that was complete.)
- Extension of the BMT Fourth Avenue Line east to the Fort Hamilton Parkway Line and the BMT West End Line.
- A two-track line from the BMT Fourth Avenue Line at 67th Street to Staten Island via the Staten Island Tunnel.
- Extension of the IRT New Lots Line from New Lots Avenue to Lefferts Boulevard.
- Extension of the IRT Flushing Line to Bell Boulevard in Bayside via Main Street, Kissena Boulevard, and Northern Boulevard.
- A branch off the IRT Flushing Line to Jamaica from Roosevelt Avenue.

A major expansion of the IND was first planned in 1929. It would have added over 100 miles of new routes in Manhattan, Brooklyn, Queens, and the Bronx, merging with, intersecting or extending the existing IND rights-of way. It was claimed that this expansion, combined with the operating IRT, BMT, and IND lines, would provide subway service within a half mile of anyone's doorstep within these four boroughs. Pricing – excluding acquisition and equipment costs – was estimated at US$438 million. The entire first phase had only cost US$338 million, including acquisition and equipment costs.

Not long after these plans were unveiled, the Wall Street Crash of 1929 occurred and the Great Depression was ushered in, and the plans essentially became history overnight. Various forms of the expansion resurfaced in 1939, 1940, 1951, 1968, and 1998 but were never realized. This was the time when the IND had planned widespread elevated construction.

The Second Avenue Subway, one of the main parts of the plan, opened between 63rd and 96th Streets as of January 1, 2017.

== Post-unification ==
The Court Street station on the IND Fulton Street Line was closed on June 1, 1946 due to low ridership. After World War II ended, workers and materials became available for public use again. The badly needed extension to the more efficient terminal at Broadway − East New York (the current Broadway Junction station) opened on December 30, 1946. The extension of the Fulton Street Line, the completion of which had been delayed due to war priorities, was finished by funds obtained by Mayor William O'Dwyer and was placed in operation on November 28, 1948, running along Pennsylvania Avenue and Pitkin Avenue to Euclid Avenue near the Queens border. Forty additional R10 cars were placed into service for the extension. The cost of the extension was about $46,500,000. It included the construction of the new Pitkin Avenue Storage Yard, which could accommodate 585 subway cars on 40 storage tracks.

The existing 169th Street station provided an unsatisfactory terminal setup for a four track line, and this required the turning of F trains at Parsons Boulevard, and no storage facilities were provided at the station. Therefore, the line was going to be extended to 184th Place with a station at 179th Street with two island platforms, sufficient entrances and exits, and storage for four ten-car trains. The facilities would allow for the operation of express and local service to the station. Construction on the extension started in 1946, and was projected to be completed in 1949. The extension was completed later than expected and opened on December 11, 1950. This extension was delayed due to the Great Depression and World War II. Both E and F trains were extended to the new station.

During the 1950s, the IND was extended over two pieces of elevated line that were disconnected from the original BMT system: the BMT Culver Line in 1954, and the Liberty Avenue extension of the BMT Fulton Street Line in 1956. On October 30, 1954 the Culver Ramp opened, connecting the IND Culver Line to the BMT Culver Line at Ditmas Avenue. IND trains begin operating over the BMT Culver Line to Coney Island–Stillwell Avenue. On April 29, 1956, the Liberty Avenue Elevated, the easternmost section of the former BMT Fulton Street Line, was connected to the IND Fulton Street Line. IND service was extended from Euclid Avenue out to Lefferts Boulevard via a new station at Grant Avenue.

On June 28, 1956, service on the IND Rockaway Line began between Euclid Avenue and Rockaway Park at 6:38 PM and between Euclid Avenue and Wavecrest at 6:48 PM. A new station at Far Rockaway–Mott Avenue opened on January 16, 1958, completing the Rockaway Line.

In November 1967, the first part of the Chrystie Street Connection opened and Sixth Avenue Line express tracks opened from 34th Street–Herald Square to West Fourth Street–Washington Square. With the opening of the connection to the Manhattan Bridge, BB service was renamed B and was extended via the new express tracks and the connection to the West End Line in Brooklyn. In non-rush hours, B service terminated northbound at either West 4th Street (middays and Saturdays) or as the TT shuttle at 36th Street in Brooklyn (nights and Sundays). D service was routed via the connection and onto the Brighton Line instead of via the Culver Line. It only ran express during rush hours. F service was extended from Broadway–Lafayette Street during rush hours, and from 34th Street during other times to Coney Island via the Culver Line.

In July 1968, the 57th Street station opened and the portion of the Chrystie Street Connection connecting the line with the Williamsburg Bridge was opened for regular service (although it had been previously used in passenger service for occasional post-Chrystie Street weekend D maintenance reroutes). Service on the KK was inaugurated, running from 57th Street to 168th Street on the BMT Jamaica Line. B service began running during non-rush hours (local on 6th Avenue) to 57th Street. D trains began running express via the Sixth Avenue Line at all times.

In December 1988 the IND Archer Avenue Line opened from Jamaica Center–Parsons/Archer to Jamaica–Van Wyck.

A month shy of twenty years after construction began, the IND 63rd Street Line went into service on October 29, 1989, after an expenditure of $898 million, extending service from 57th Street with new stations at Lexington Avenue, Roosevelt Island, and 21st Street at 41st Avenue in Queens. The IND line was served by Q trains on weekdays, B trains on weekends and F trains at night (signed Q northbound from 2nd Avenue and southbound as far as 57th Street), as well as the extended JFK Express. The 1,500-foot connector to the Queens Boulevard Line had not yet started construction. The BMT connection between the new Lexington Avenue station and 57th Street-7th Avenue was not in use at that time; it was built for the future connection to the Second Avenue Subway for BMT Broadway service from the Upper East Side to Lower Manhattan.

Planning for the connection to the IND Queens Boulevard Line began in December 1990, with the final design contract awarded in December 1992. Construction began on September 22, 1994. The remaining section from 21st Street to the Queens Boulevard Line cost $645 million. In December 2000, the 63rd Street Connector was opened for construction reroutes. The Connector came into regular use in December 2001 with the rerouting of F service at all times to 63rd Street. The construction project extended the lower level LIRR tunnel and involved a number of other elements, including the integration of ventilation plants, lowering a sewer siphon 50 feet, rehabilitation of elements of the existing line, mitigating ground water, diverting trains which continued to run through the project area and widening of the entry point to the Queens Boulevard Line to six tracks. This new tunnel connection allowed rerouting the Queens Boulevard Line F trains via the 63rd Street Tunnel, which opened up capacity through the 53rd Street tunnel to Manhattan which allowed a new local service, the V train, to provide additional Queens Boulevard service to Manhattan, along Sixth Avenue. This service was discontinued in 2010 and replaced with an extension of the M train.

== As built ==
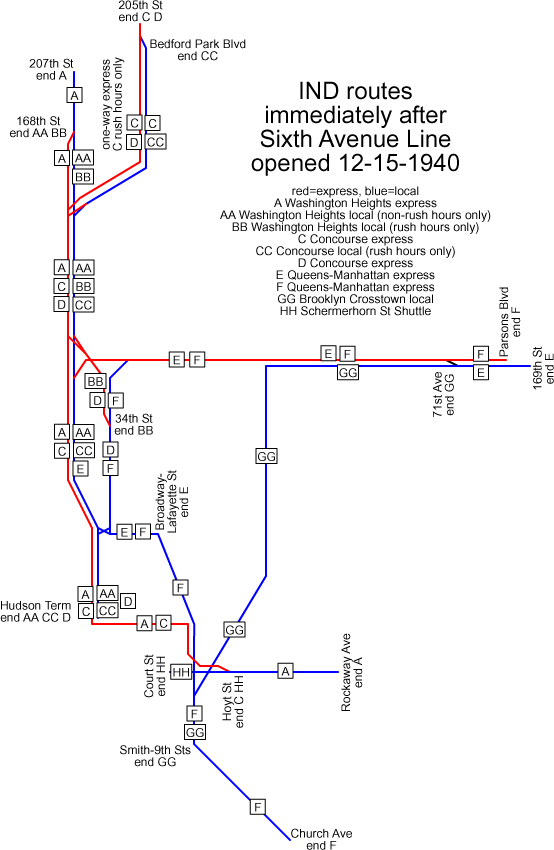
Service patterns of the IND c. 1940

=== The Bronx and Manhattan ===
- Concourse Line (B and D trains): under the Grand Concourse from 205th Street south to 161st Street, then west under the Harlem River into Manhattan and south to the Eighth Avenue Line (parallel to the IRT Jerome Avenue Line)
- Eighth Avenue Line (A, C, and E trains): from 207th Street, south roughly under Broadway; under Saint Nicholas Avenue, Eighth Avenue, Greenwich Avenue, Sixth Avenue (with a junction with the Sixth Avenue Line/Houston Street Line), Church Street, and Fulton Street; under the East River via the Cranberry Street Tunnel into Brooklyn, to the Fulton Street Line (parallel to the IRT Ninth Avenue Line)
- Sixth Avenue Line (B, D, F, <F>, and M trains): from a split from the Eighth Avenue Line at 53rd Street, two blocks east to Sixth Avenue, then south under Sixth Avenue to a junction with the Eighth Avenue Line north of Houston Street, then east under Houston Street and south under Essex Street and Rutgers Street to the Rutgers Street Tunnel to Brooklyn – parallel to the IRT Sixth Avenue Elevated
- Queens Boulevard Line (E, F, and <F> trains): from the 53rd Street Tunnel from Queens, west under 53rd Street past a junction with the Sixth Avenue Line to merge with the Eighth Avenue Line – partly parallel to the IRT Sixth Avenue Elevated connection to the IRT Ninth Avenue Elevated along 53rd Street

=== East River crossings ===
- 53rd Street Tunnel (E, F, and <F> trains) – along the Queens Boulevard Line
- Rutgers Street Tunnel (F and <F> trains) – connecting the Sixth Avenue Line to the Culver Line
- Cranberry Street Tunnel (A and C trains) – connecting the Eighth Avenue Line to the Fulton Street Line

=== Brooklyn and Queens ===
- Queens Boulevard Line (E, F, <F>, M, and R trains): from 169th Street, west under Hillside Avenue, Queens Boulevard, Broadway, Northern Boulevard and 44th Drive to the 53rd Street Tunnel to Manhattan
- Crosstown Line (G train): from the Queens Boulevard Line at Queens Plaza, south under Jackson Avenue, Manhattan Avenue, Union Avenue, Marcy Avenue and Lafayette Avenue, coming into the middle of the Fulton Street Line and connecting south into the Culver Line
- Culver Line (originally the Smith Street Line) (F, <F>, and G trains): from the Rutgers Street Tunnel, south under Jay Street and Smith Street, coming to the surface and turning east over the Gowanus Canal at Ninth Street, then back underground, under Ninth Street, Prospect Park West, Prospect Avenue, Fort Hamilton Parkway and McDonald Avenue, ending at Church Avenue (later extended south along the BMT Culver Line)
- Fulton Street Line (A and C trains): from Court Street (now the New York Transit Museum) and the Cranberry Street Tunnel east under Fulton Street to Rockaway Avenue (later extended east along the BMT Liberty Avenue Elevated) – parallel to the BMT Fulton Street Elevated

=== Extensions after 1940 ===
The following extensions and connections were built after unification in 1940:

- Queens Boulevard Line (E, F, and <F> trains): extended east to 179th Street
- Culver Line (F and <F> trains): extended south along the ex-BMT Culver Line
- 60th Street Tunnel Connection (R train): connecting the BMT's 60th Street Tunnel to the Queens Boulevard Line
- Fulton Street Line (A train): extended east to and over the BMT Liberty Avenue Elevated
- Rockaway Line (A train): south from the Fulton Street Line east of Rockaway Boulevard
- Chrystie Street Connection, connecting the Houston Street Line (Sixth Avenue Line) to the BMT lines over the Williamsburg Bridge (M train) and Manhattan Bridge (B and D trains)
- Archer Avenue Line (E train): from the Queens Boulevard Line at Van Wyck Boulevard south and east to Jamaica Center
- 63rd Street Line (F and M trains): connecting the Sixth Avenue Line and the Queens Boulevard Line through the 63rd Street Tunnel, and connecting to the BMT 63rd Street Line

The following extension is partially open:

- IND Second Avenue Line (Q train): from 96th Street to 72nd Street, then connecting with the BMT 63rd Street Line

== Line planning ==
Many IND lines were designed to be parallel to existing IRT and BMT subway lines in order to compete with them.

- The IND Concourse Line is within one to three short blocks of the IRT Jerome Avenue Line for most of its length. It was also planned to replace the then-NYW&B-owned line as well as the IRT White Plains Road Line.
- The IND Eighth Avenue Line is within 0.25 miles (0.40 km) of the IRT Broadway–Seventh Avenue Line and the IRT Lenox Avenue Line for most of its length. It was designed to replace the IRT Ninth Avenue Line.
- The IND Sixth Avenue Line was designed to replace the IRT Sixth Avenue Line.
- The IND Fulton Street Line is within 0.5 miles (0.80 km) of the IRT Eastern Parkway Line and the IRT New Lots Line for most of its length in Brooklyn. It was designed to replace the BMT Fulton Street Line.
- The IND Crosstown Line was designed to replace BMT streetcars.
- The Second Avenue Subway is designed to be within 0.25 miles (0.40 km) of the IRT Lexington Avenue Line, and to replace the IRT Second Avenue Line and the IRT Third Avenue Line.

Additionally, some never-built lines were designed to replace old elevated lines.

- The IRT Dyre Avenue Line and IRT Pelham Line were to be recaptured by the IND Second Avenue Line.
- The IND Utica Avenue Line and the IND Archer Avenue Line were both designed to replace parts of the BMT Jamaica Line. The latter would also be planned to replace the Atlantic Branch of the Long Island Rail Road.

== Service letters ==
As originally designed, the IND train identification scheme was based on three things: the Manhattan trunk line served (8th Avenue or 6th Avenue), the northern branch line served (Washington Heights, Grand Concourse/Bronx, or Queens Boulevard), and the service level (Express or Local). The 8th Avenue routes were A, C, and E. The 6th Avenue routes were B, D, and F. The A and B served Washington Heights. The C and D served the Grand Concourse. The E and F served Queens Boulevard via the 53rd Street Tunnel.

A single letter indicated an express service, while a double letter indicated local service. G was used for Brooklyn-Queens "Crosstown" service. H was used for any service on the extended Fulton Street (Brooklyn) line that did not originate in Manhattan.

The first designations were as follows:

| A | AA | Eighth Avenue – Washington Heights |
| | BB | Sixth Avenue – Washington Heights |
| C | CC | Eighth Avenue – Concourse |
| D | | Sixth Avenue – Concourse |
| E | | Eighth Avenue – Queens Boulevard |
| F | | Sixth Avenue – Queens Boulevard |
| G | GG | Brooklyn-Queens Crosstown |
| | HH | Fulton Street |
| S | | Special |

Virtually all possibilities were used at one time or another, either in regular service or as brief special routes. The "G" single-letter service was used for G service to World's Fair Station in 1939.

The final pre-Chrystie Street Connection service is shown here; for more details, see the individual service pages. Terminals shown are the furthest the service reached.

| | Line | Routing | Notes |
|---|---|---|---|
| A | Washington Heights Express | 207th Street – Lefferts Boulevard or Far Rockaway or Rockaway Park (via Eighth Avenue) | still in use |
| AA | Washington Heights Local | 168th Street – Hudson Terminal (via Eighth Avenue) | became K (no longer operated) |
| BB | Washington Heights Local | 168th Street – 34th Street (via Sixth Avenue) | became B (now goes from Bedford Park Boulevard to Brighton Beach) |
| C | Bronx Concourse Express | 205th Street – Utica Avenue (via Eighth Avenue) | no longer operated; combined into A and D trains |
| CC | Bronx Concourse Local | Bedford Park Boulevard – Hudson Terminal (via Eighth Avenue) | became C (now goes from 168th Street to Euclid Avenue) |
| D | Bronx Concourse Express | 205th Street – Coney Island (via Sixth Avenue and Culver Line) | still in use, though trains now use the West End Line |
| E | Queens–Manhattan Express | 179th Street – Hudson Terminal or Rockaway Park (via Eighth Avenue and Houston Street) | still in use, though all trains go from Jamaica Center to Hudson Terminal (now called World Trade Center) |
| F | Queens–Manhattan Express | 179th Street – Hudson Terminal or Coney Island (via Sixth Avenue) | still in use, though all trains go to Coney Island or Kings Highway |
| GG | Queens Brooklyn Local | Forest Hills – Church Avenue (via Crosstown Line) | became G, though all trains short turn at Court Square |
| HH | Court Street Shuttle | Court Street – Hoyt–Schermerhorn Streets | no longer operated, but the trackage is used for moving trains in and out of the New York Transit Museum, located in the Court Street station |
| HH | Rockaway Local | Euclid Avenue – Rockaway Park or Far Rockaway | became H, then S, though now, all trains only go to Rockaway Park |

After the Chrystie Street Connection opened, the original IND Service Letter scheme was gradually abandoned. All lines, whether local or express, now use a single letter, and only the 8th Avenue/6th Avenue distinction (A, C, E vs. B, D, F) has been maintained. Following consolidation under city ownership, the numbered routes of the former BMT system were also gradually relabeled to letters for consistency with the IND system.

== Platform lengths ==
The IND was built with longer platforms than those of the IRT or BMT. Initial plans called for stations to be built with 660 feet (201 m) long platforms to accommodate trains of eleven 60-foot (18.3 m) cars. These lengths were shortened, as stations on the IND Eighth Avenue Line between 72nd Street and 163rd Street – Amsterdam Avenue have lengths of exactly 600 feet (183 m). There were two exceptions: 96th Street was 615 feet (187 m) on both levels, as that was the standard length of platforms built for the IND after the 1940s.

The 81st Street–Museum of Natural History station had an uptown platform that was 630 feet (192 m) long, and a downtown platform that was 615 feet (187 m). Platforms of exactly 600 feet (183 m) length can be found on some IND Queens Boulevard Line stations between Elmhurst Avenue and 67th Avenue.

Some of the IND Sixth Avenue Line stations have much greater platform lengths. In 34th Street–Herald Square, the uptown platform was originally 745 feet (227 m), long enough to hold a 12-car train of 60-foot (18.3 m) cars. The downtown platform was originally 685 feet (209 m). Both platforms of the 23rd Street station are 670 feet (204 m). The 47th–50th Streets–Rockefeller Center station has platforms that are 665 feet (203 m).

In the IND Second System, planned stations would have been 700 to 720 feet (213 to 219 m) long and tile work would have been more "modern".

== Surviving IND equipment ==
The Independent Subway System operated solely with one family of subway cars – commonly referred to as the R1–9 fleet – comprising the R1s, R4s, R6s, R7/As and R9 cars. After the equipment was retired in the 1970s, twenty cars were sent to various museums. Eleven of these cars are preserved by the New York Transit Museum and Railway Preservation Corp. The other nine are on private property or preserved at other museums.

== See also ==
- Brooklyn–Manhattan Transit Corporation (BMT)
- Brooklyn Rapid Transit Company (BRT)
- Interborough Rapid Transit Company (IRT)

== Sources ==
Books:

- Cudahy, Brian J. (1988). Under the Sidewalks of New York (revised ed.). Lexington, Mass: The Stephen Greene Press.
- Cunningham, Joseph; DeHart, Leonard (1977). A History of the New York City Subway System: The Independent System and City Ownership.
- Dahl, Gerhard M. (1924). Transit Truths. Brooklyn, NY: Brooklyn-Manhattan Transit Corporation.
- Fischler, Stan (1997). The Subway: A Trip Through Time on New York's Rapid Transit. Flushing, NY: H & M Productions, Inc.
- George, Herbert (1993). Change at Ozone Park. Flanders, NJ: RAE Publishing Inc.
- Kahn, Alan Paul; May, Jack (1977). The Tracks of New York, Number 3. New York: Electric Railroaders' Association, Inc.
- Kramer, Frederick A. (1990). Building the Independent Subway. New York: Quadrant Press, Inc.
- Kramer, Frederick A. (1991). Subway to the World's Fair. Westfield, NJ: Bells and Whistles.
- Snyder, Robert W. (1997). Transit Talk. Brooklyn, NY, New Brunswick, NJ and London: New York Transit Museum and Rutgers University Press.

Periodicals:

- Electric Railroaders' Association: Headlights Magazine: August 1956, February 1968, February 1973, August 1974, July/September 1977, May/June 1988

Newspapers:

- The New York Times (before 1977), most notably: 1929: September 16, 22; 1932: September 4, 8, 9, 10; 1940: June 1, 2, 12, 13; 1967: November 22, 26, 28
- Unpublished document from New York City Transit Authority – precursor to "Facts and Figures", 1977
