= K (Eighth Avenue Local) =

New York City Subway service (1932–88)

- Eighth Avenue Local

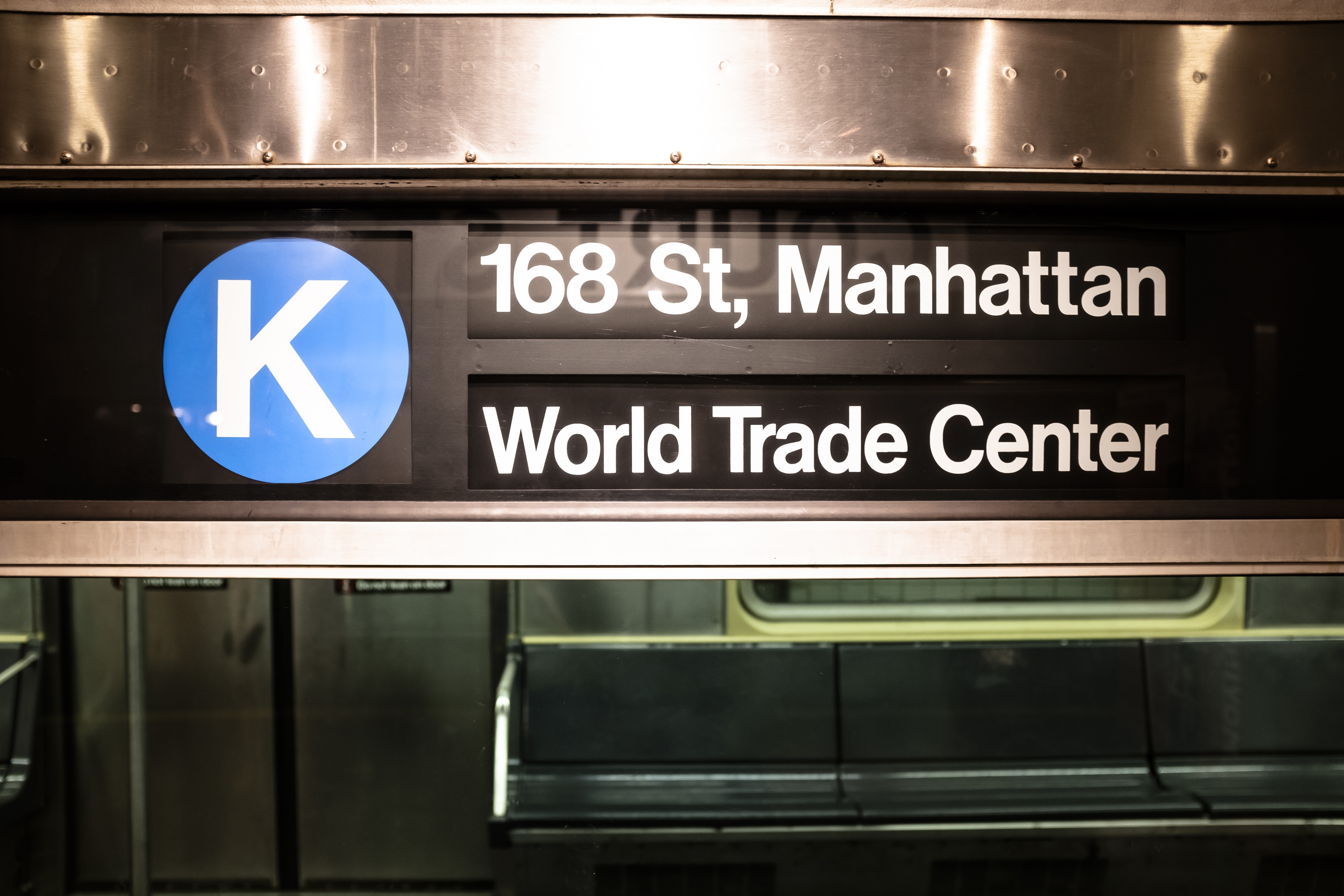
- K train rollsign on a preserved R42 car at the New York Transit Museum
- Northern end: 168th Street
- Southern end: World Trade Center
- Stations: 23
- Started service: September 10, 1932; 94 years ago
- Discontinued: December 11, 1988; 37 years ago

The K Eighth Avenue Local, earlier the AA, was a rapid transit service of the New York City Subway. Its route bullet was colored blue on station signs, car rollsigns, and the official subway map since it ran on the IND Eighth Avenue Line.

The K operated during midday, evenings, and weekends, making local stops between 168th Street in Washington Heights, Manhattan and World Trade Center in Lower Manhattan via Central Park West and Eighth Avenue in Manhattan. During late night hours, the A express made local stops on the IND Eighth Avenue Line. During rush hours, the C, formerly the CC, ran between Bedford Park Boulevard and Euclid Avenue, replacing the K as the local on Eighth Avenue. It was discontinued in 1988 as part of a series of major service changes.

== History ==
=== Service as the AA ===
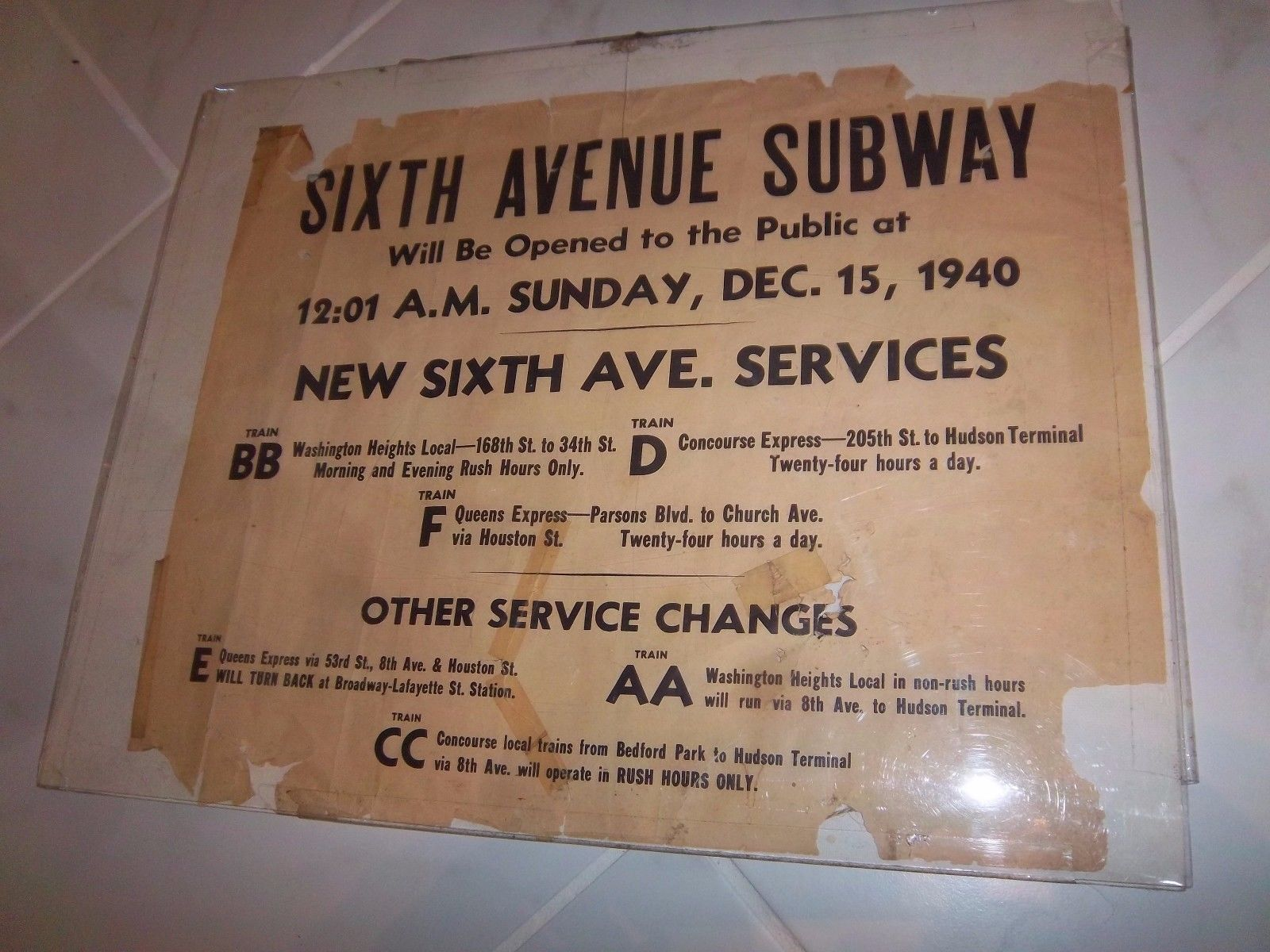
Sixth Avenue Subway Will Be Opened to the Public at 12:01 A.M. Sunday, Dec 15, 1940

A and AA service began on September 10, 1932, with the opening of the IND Eighth Avenue Line. The Independent Subway System (IND) used single letters to refer to express services and double letters for local services. The A ran express and the AA ran local, from 168th Street to Hudson Terminal (now World Trade Center). The AA ran at all times, and it was extended to 207th Street during nights and on Sundays when the A did not run. When the Eighth Avenue Line was extended to Jay Street–Borough Hall on February 1, 1933, the AA was extended there evenings and Sundays, when the A did not run.

On July 1, 1933, the AA was suspended when the Concourse Line opened and the new CC service provided local service on Eighth Avenue in its place. A service began running express in Manhattan at all times. AA service was restored as part of changes made in conjunction with the opening of the IND Sixth Avenue Line on December 15, 1940. The AA would only run during non-rush hours and Saturday late afternoon through all day Sunday service to Chambers Street. Rush hours, which at the time included Saturday mornings and afternoons, the AA did not run; it was replaced by the BB (later B) service, which instead ran on the Sixth Avenue Line. On January 5, 1952, AA service began operating during Saturday mornings and afternoons, replacing BB service. This pattern was unchanged until August 28, 1977, when late night service was replaced by an all local A service.

=== Service as the K ===
On May 6, 1985, as part of the elimination of double letters, the AA was renamed the K. This service operated between 168th Street and World Trade Center during midday, evenings, and weekends. During late night hours, the A express made local stops on the Eighth Avenue Line. During rush hours, the C, formerly the CC, ran between Bedford Park Boulevard and Rockaway Park–Beach 116th Street, replacing the K as the local on Eighth Avenue. This change was not officially reflected in schedules until May 24, 1987.

On December 11, 1988, as part of the widespread service changes that day, the K was discontinued, being replaced by the C train, which was expanded from its rush-hour only service to include midday service between 145th Street and Euclid Avenue, early evening (until 9 p.m.) service from 145th Street to World Trade Center, and weekend service matching the former K between 168th Street and World Trade Center. The B was also expanded to middays to match part of the former K.

On June 8 and June 18, 2026, the K made a return to commemorate the NBA New York Knicks qualifying for the NBA Finals for the first time since 1999, and winning the finals for the first time since 1973 respectively. On June 8, an eight-car train made up of all R32 subway cars signed as K made two round trips between 168th Street and World Trade Center. The train made express stops between 168th Street and 59th Street–Columbus Circle, and all stops between 59th Street and World Trade Center, in both directions. This was repeated on June 18, except it made all express stops to Euclid Avenue in Brooklyn and it ran all day.

== Signage history ==
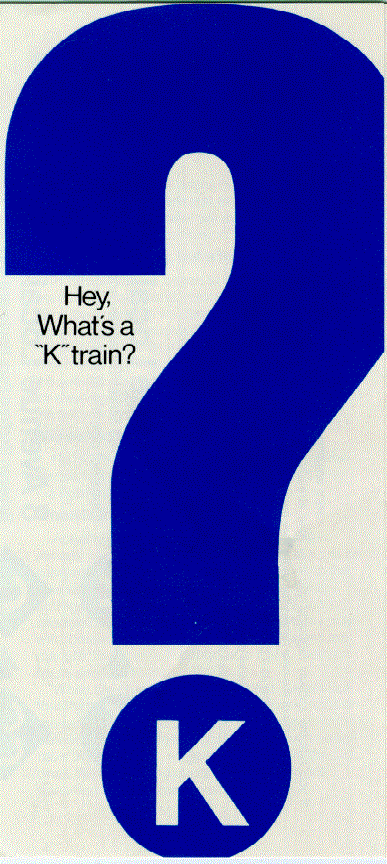
This brochure was published in 1985 to explain the relabeling of double-letter subway services, including the creation of the K.

AA service

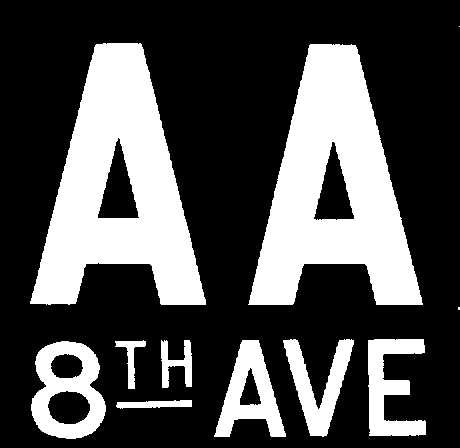
Pre-1967 bullet used on the R1s to R38s

1967-1979 bullet

1979-1985 bullet
K service (8th Avenue only)

1985-1987 bullet

1987-1988 bullet

== Final route ==
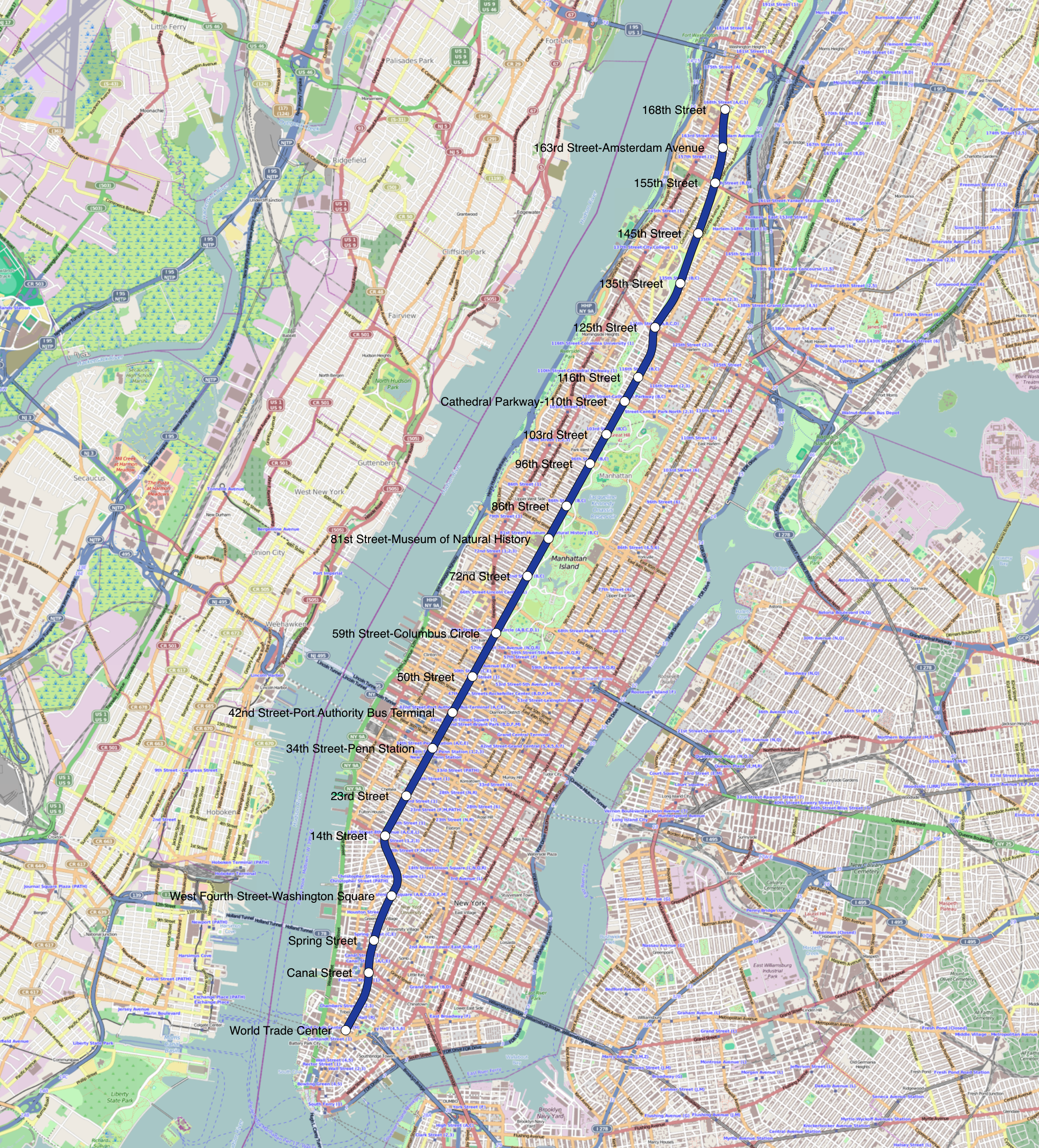
To scale line map

=== Service pattern ===
The following table shows the lines used by the K service:

Line	From	To	Tracks
IND Eighth Avenue Line	168th Street	World Trade Center	Local

=== Stations ===
For a more detailed station listing, see the articles on the lines listed above.

Station service legend
Stops all times	Stops 24 hours a day
Stops all times except late nights	Stops every day during daytime hours only
Stops weekdays during the day	Stops during weekday daytime hours only
Stops rush hours in the peak direction only	Stops weekdays in the peak direction only
Time period details
Disabled access	Station is compliant with the Americans with Disabilities Act
↑	Station is compliant with the Americans with Disabilities Act in the indicated direction only
↓	Station is compliant with the Americans with Disabilities Act in the indicated direction only
	Elevator access to mezzanine only

K service	Stations	Disabled access	Subway transfers	Connections
Manhattan
Stops all times	168th Street	Disabled access		
Stops all times	163rd Street–Amsterdam Avenue			
Stops all times	155th Street			
Stops all times	145th Street		A D (IND Concourse Line)	
Stops all times	135th Street			
Stops all times	125th Street		A D	
Stops all times	116th Street			
Stops all times	Cathedral Parkway–110th Street			
Stops all times	103rd Street			
Stops all times	96th Street			
Stops all times	86th Street			
Stops all times	81st Street–Museum of Natural History			
Stops all times	72nd Street			
Stops all times	59th Street–Columbus Circle		A D 1 (IRT Broadway–Seventh Avenue Line)	
Stops all times	50th Street		E	
Stops all times	42nd Street–Port Authority Bus Terminal		A E 1 2 3 (IRT Broadway–Seventh Avenue Line), 7 <7> (IRT Flushing Line), B D N Q R (BMT Broadway Line), S (42nd Street Shuttle) at Times Square–42nd Street	Port Authority Bus Terminal; Note: Yellow B and D services discontinued
Stops all times	34th Street–Penn Station		A E	Amtrak, LIRR, NJ Transit at Pennsylvania Station
Stops all times	23rd Street		E	
Stops all times	14th Street		A E L (BMT Canarsie Line)	
Stops all times	West Fourth Street–Washington Square		A E F <F> S JFK (IND Sixth Avenue Line)	PATH at Ninth Street; Note: Grand Street Shuttle and JFK Express discontinued
Stops all times	Spring Street		E	
Stops all times	Canal Street		A E	
Stops all times	World Trade Center		E A (IND Eighth Avenue Line at Chambers Street); 2 3 (IRT Broadway–Seventh Avenue Line at Park Place)	PATH at World Trade Center
