= 110th Cavalry =

110th Cavalry may refer to:

- 110th Cavalry Division, Soviet Union
- 110th Cavalry Regiment (United States, 1921–1940)
- 110th Cavalry Regiment (United States, 1988–1996)
- 110th (Northumberland) Company, Imperial Yeomanry

== See also ==
- 110th Brigade (disambiguation)
- 110th Division (disambiguation)
- 110th Regiment (disambiguation)
