= 110th =

110th is the ordinal form of the number 110. 110th or One hundred and tenth may also refer to:

- A fraction, 1/110, equal to one of 110 equal parts

== Geography ==
- 110th meridian east, a line of longitude
- 110th meridian west, a line of longitude
- 110th Street (disambiguation)

== Military ==
- 110th Brigade (disambiguation)
- 110th Division (disambiguation)
- 110th Regiment (disambiguation)

== See also ==
- April 20, 110th day of the year in a standard year
