= 96th Street station (IND Eighth Avenue Line) =

New York City Subway station in Manhattan

96 Street
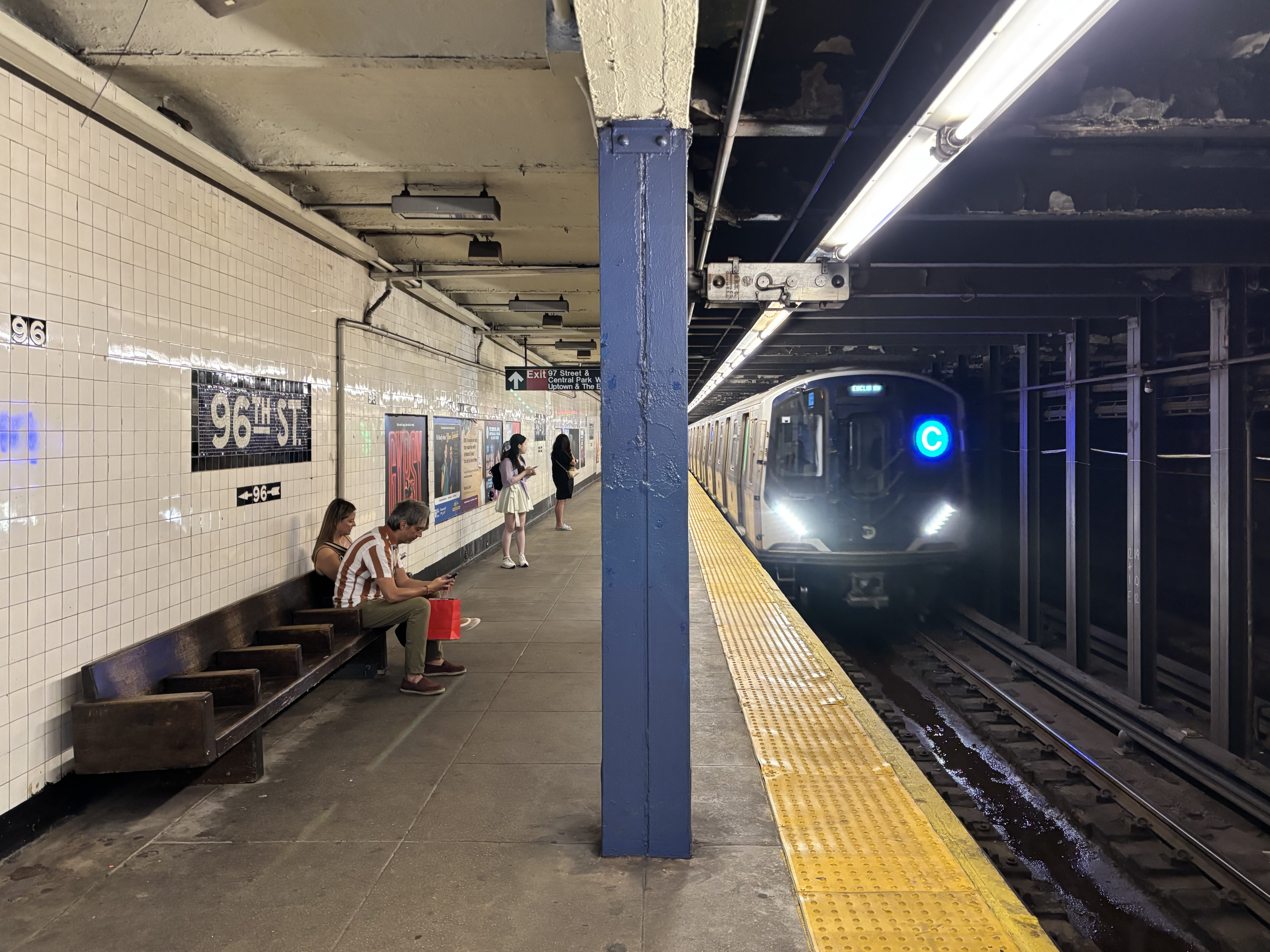
- Southbound R211A C train arriving

Station statistics
- Address: West 96th Street & Central Park West; New York, New York
- Borough: Manhattan
- Locale: Upper West Side
- Coordinates: 40.791622°N 73.964725°W
- Division: B (IND)
- Line: IND Eighth Avenue Line
- Services: A (late nights); B (weekdays during the day); C (all except late nights)
- Transit: NYCT Bus: M10, M96, M106
- Structure: Underground
- Levels: 2
- Platforms: 2 side platforms (1 on each level)
- Tracks: 4 (2 on each level)

Other information
- Opened: September 10, 1932 (94 years ago)
- Accessible: No; under construction

Traffic
- 2025: 2,274,987 ▲1.5%
- Rank: 159 out of 423
Services
Preceding station	New York City Subway	Following station
103rd Street A B C via 145th Street	Local	86th Street A B C via 59th Street–Columbus Circle
does not stop here
Location
Location within New York City Subway
Location within New York City
Location within New York
Track layout
Street map
Station service legend
Symbol	Description
Stops all times except late nights	Stops all times except late nights
Stops late nights only	Stops late nights only
Stops weekdays during the day	Stops weekdays during the day

The 96th Street station is a local station on the IND Eighth Avenue Line of the New York City Subway. Located at West 96th Street and Central Park West on the Upper West Side, it is served by the B train on weekdays and by the C train at all times except late nights, when the A train takes over service.

== History ==
New York City mayor John Francis Hylan's original plans for the Independent Subway System (IND), proposed in 1922, included building over 100 miles (160 km) of new lines and taking over nearly 100 miles (160 km) of existing lines. The lines were designed to compete with the existing underground, surface, and elevated lines operated by the Interborough Rapid Transit Company (IRT) and BMT. On December 9, 1924, the New York City Board of Transportation (BOT) gave preliminary approval for the construction of the IND Eighth Avenue Line. This line consisted of a corridor connecting Inwood, Manhattan, to Downtown Brooklyn, running largely under Eighth Avenue but also paralleling Greenwich Avenue and Sixth Avenue in Lower Manhattan. The BOT announced a list of stations on the new line in February 1928, with a local station at 95th Street.

The finishes at the five stations between 81st Street and 110th Street were 18 percent completed by May 1930. By that August, the BOT reported that the Eighth Avenue Line was nearly completed and that the five stations from 81st to 110th Street were 99 percent completed. The entire line was completed by September 1931, except for the installation of turnstiles. A preview event for the new subway was hosted on September 8, 1932, two days before the official opening. The 96th Street station opened on September 10, 1932, as part of the city-operated IND's initial segment, the Eighth Avenue Line between Chambers Street and 207th Street. Construction of the whole line cost $191.2 million (equivalent to $4,511.9 million in 2025). While the IRT Broadway–Seventh Avenue Line already provided parallel service, the new Eighth Avenue subway via Central Park West provided an alternative route.

In 2019, the Metropolitan Transportation Authority announced that the station would become ADA-accessible as part of the agency's 2020–2024 Capital Program. A request for proposals was put out on May 18, 2023 for the contract for a project bundle to make 13 stations accessible, including 96th Street. The contract to add one elevator (street-to-northbound platform-to southbound platform outside fare control) at the station was awarded in December 2023. By mid-2024, the work was expected to be completed by 2026.

== Station layout ==
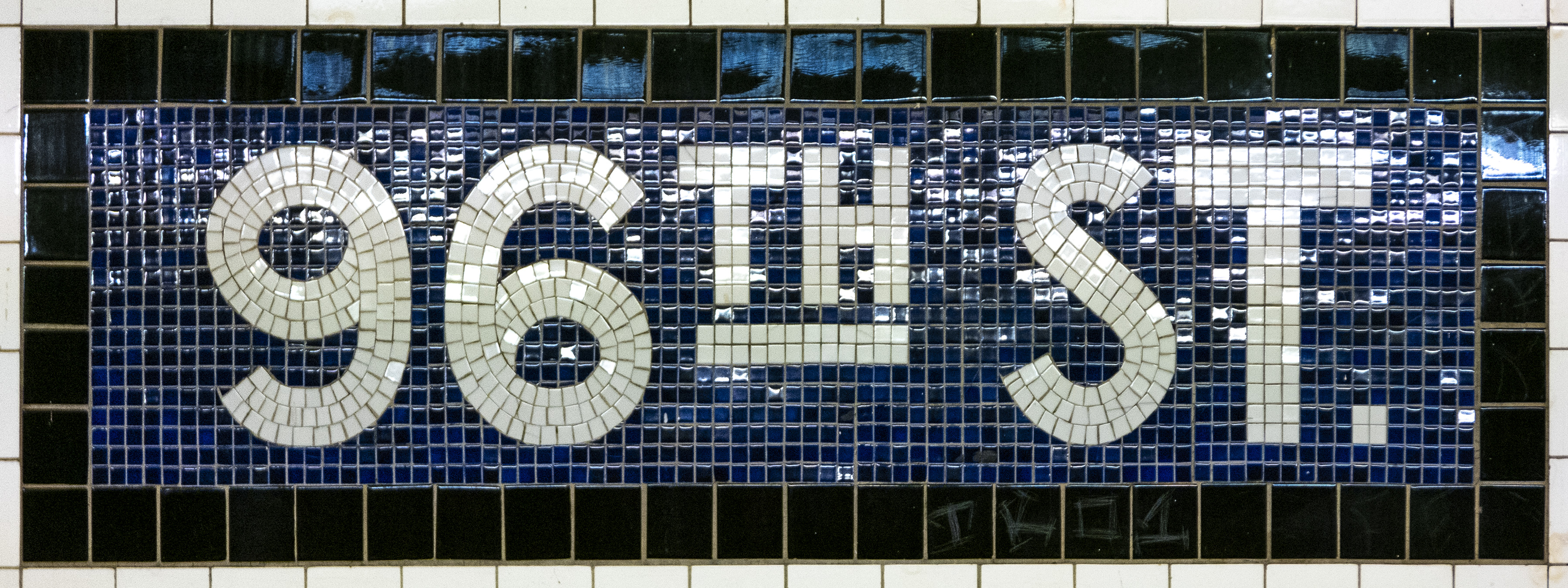
Mosaic name tablet

This underground station has two levels with northbound trains using the upper level and southbound trains using the lower level. Each level has one side platform to the west of two tracks.

The platforms have no trim line, but name tablets read "96TH ST." in white sans-serif font on a midnight blue background and black border. "96" signs in the same format as the directional signs run along the platform walls at regular intervals at the same level as the name tablets. Blue columns run along both platforms at regular intervals with alternating ones having the standard black station name plate in white numbering.

=== Exits ===
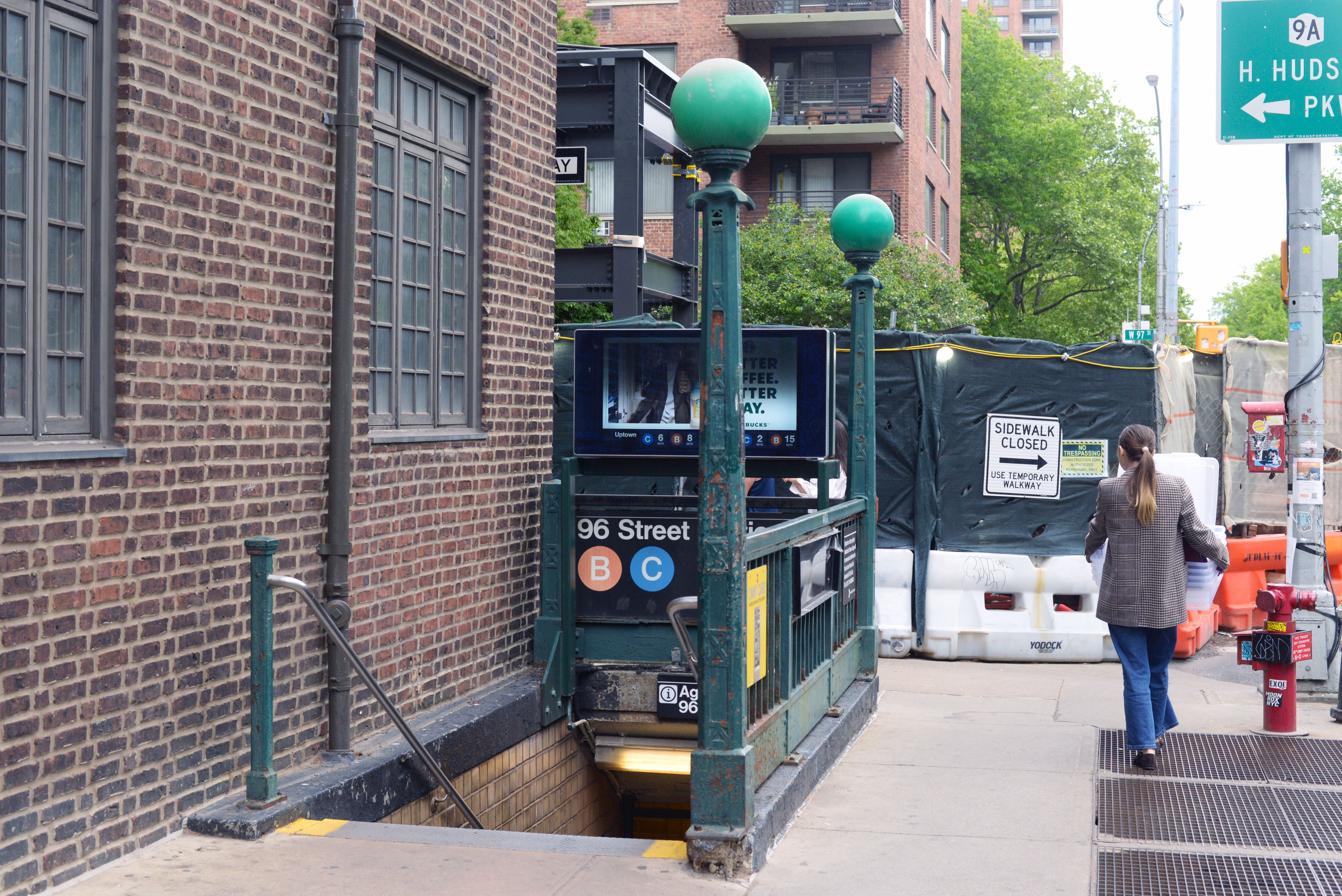
Entrance at 97th St, including the elevator under construction.

All fare control areas are on the upper level platform and two staircases, one adjacent to each area, go down to the lower level. The full-time one at 96th Street is at the center of the platform. A staircase of four steps go down to a bank of three turnstiles that lead to a token booth. The other fare control area at 97th Street, at the station's extreme north end, is unstaffed, containing High Entry/Exit Turnstiles. The northwest staircase was relocated with a longer passageway due to the widening of 97th Street.

Two staircases connect the two platforms. There are currently three exits to the following locations:

- Southwestern corner of West 96th Street and Central Park West.
- Both western corners (one staircase each) of West 97th Street and Central Park West.

Directional signs that have been covered indicate that there was a third set of exits that led to both western corners (one staircase each) to West 95th Street. Further evidence of this exit's existence includes new tiling with doorways that lead to converted storage spaces on both levels. This exit was closed by 1940 and possibly as early as November 1932 - just two months after the opening of the station - due to frequent vandalism.
