= 103rd Street station (IND Eighth Avenue Line) =

New York City Subway station in Manhattan

103 Street
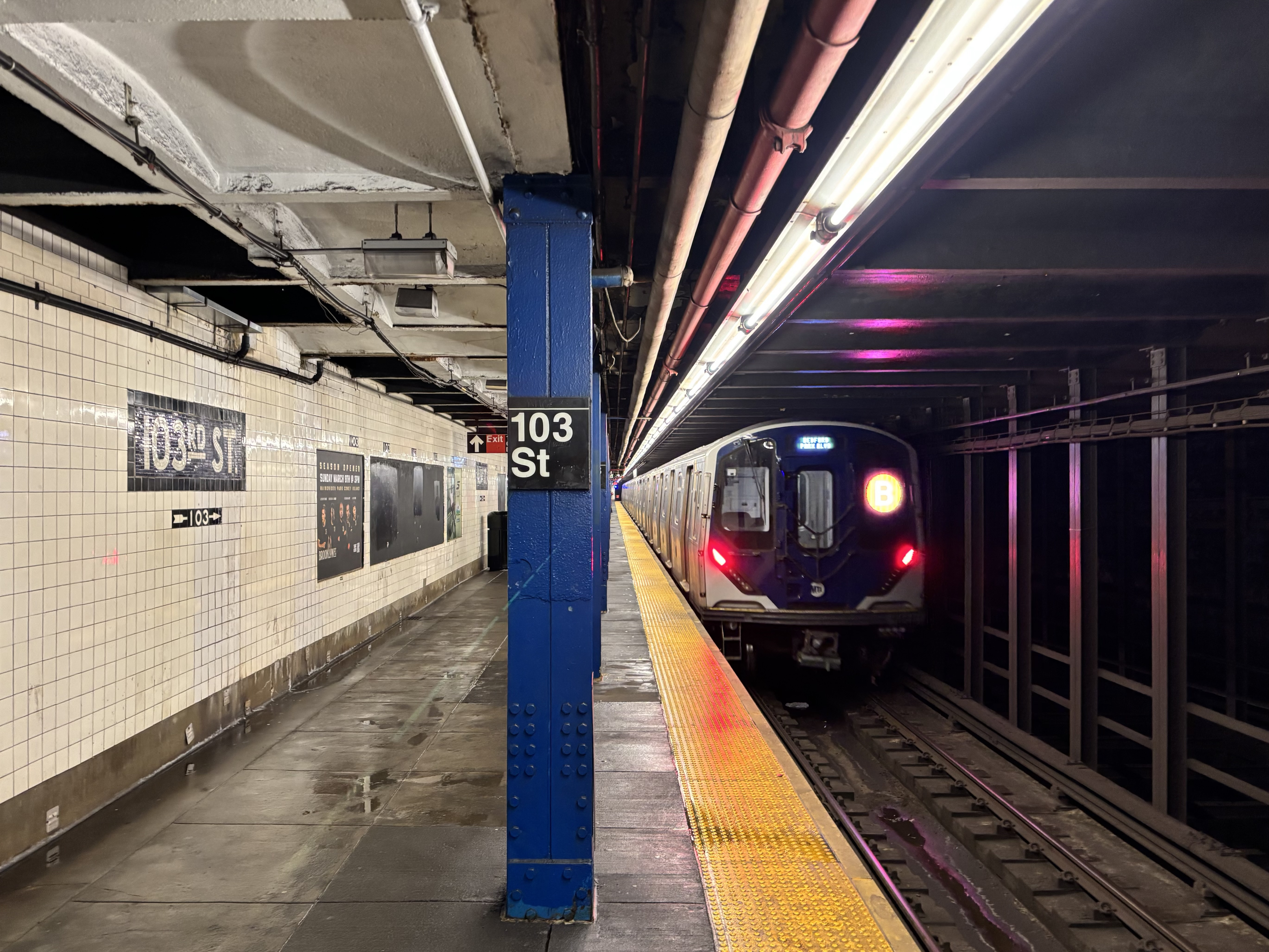
- Northbound R211A B train departing

Station statistics
- Address: West 103rd Street & Central Park West; New York, New York
- Borough: Manhattan
- Locale: Upper West Side
- Coordinates: 40.79604°N 73.96142°W
- Division: B (IND)
- Line: IND Eighth Avenue Line
- Services: A (late nights); B (weekdays during the day); C (all except late nights)
- Transit: NYCT Bus: M10
- Structure: Underground
- Levels: 2
- Platforms: 2 side platforms (1 on each level)
- Tracks: 4 (2 on lower level, 1 on upper level, 1 on ramp from upper to lower level)

Other information
- Opened: September 10, 1932 (94 years ago)

Traffic
- 2025: 1,115,360 ▲3.8%
- Rank: 290 out of 423
Services
Preceding station	New York City Subway	Following station
Cathedral Parkway–110th Street A B C via 145th Street	Local	96th Street A B C via 59th Street–Columbus Circle
does not stop here
Location
Location within New York City Subway
Location within New York City
Location within New York
Track layout
Street map
Station service legend
Symbol	Description
Stops all times except late nights	Stops all times except late nights
Stops late nights only	Stops late nights only
Stops weekdays during the day	Stops weekdays during the day

The 103rd Street station is a local station on the IND Eighth Avenue Line of the New York City Subway. Located at West 103rd Street and Central Park West on the Upper West Side, it is served by the B train on weekdays and by the C train at all times except late nights, when the A train takes over service.

== History ==
New York City mayor John Francis Hylan's original plans for the Independent Subway System (IND), proposed in 1922, included building over 100 miles (160 km) of new lines and taking over nearly 100 miles (160 km) of existing lines. The lines were designed to compete with the existing underground, surface, and elevated lines operated by the Interborough Rapid Transit Company (IRT) and BMT. On December 9, 1924, the New York City Board of Transportation (BOT) gave preliminary approval for the construction of the IND Eighth Avenue Line. This line consisted of a corridor connecting Inwood, Manhattan, to Downtown Brooklyn, running largely under Eighth Avenue but also paralleling Greenwich Avenue and Sixth Avenue in Lower Manhattan. The BOT announced a list of stations on the new line in February 1928, with a local station at 102nd Street.

The finishes at the five stations between 81st Street and 110th Street were 18 percent completed by May 1930. By that August, the BOT reported that the Eighth Avenue Line was nearly completed and that the five stations from 81st to 110th Street were 99 percent completed. The entire line was completed by September 1931, except for the installation of turnstiles. A preview event for the new subway was hosted on September 8, 1932, two days before the official opening. The 103rd Street station opened on September 10, 1932, as part of the city-operated IND's initial segment, the Eighth Avenue Line between Chambers Street and 207th Street. Construction of the whole line cost $191.2 million (equivalent to $4,511.9 million in 2025). While the IRT Broadway–Seventh Avenue Line already provided parallel service, the new Eighth Avenue subway via Central Park West provided an alternative route.

== Station layout ==
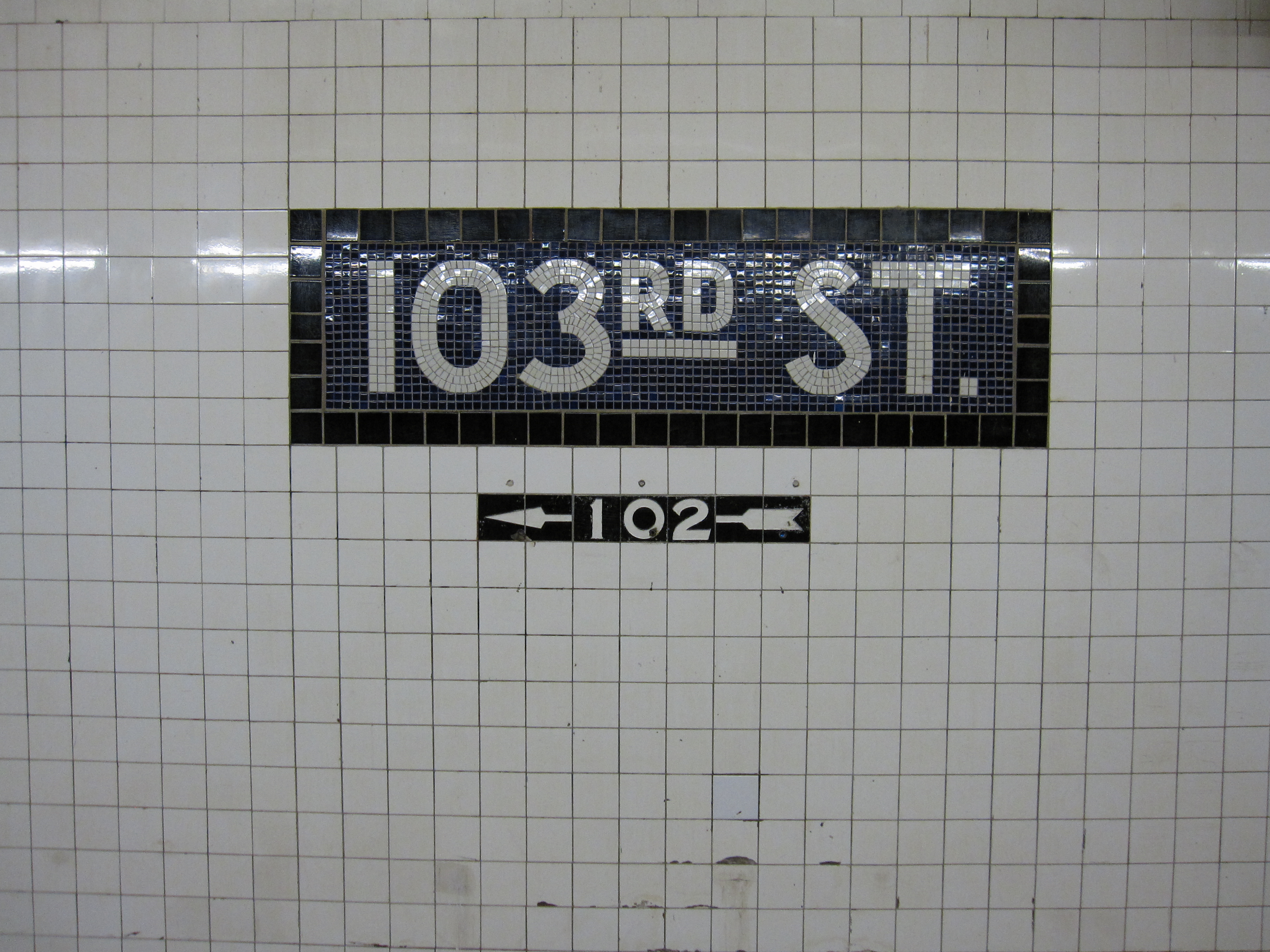
Tile color is blue with a black border

This underground station has two levels with northbound trains using the upper level and southbound trains using the lower one. Each level has one side platform to the west of two tracks.

Both platforms have no trim line, but name tablets read "103RD ST." in white sans-serif lettering on a midnight blue background and black border. Small black "103" signs with white numbering run along the tiles at regular intervals and directional signs in the same style are below the name tablets. Blue columns run along both platforms at regular intervals with every other one having the standard black station name plate in white numbering.

Within this station, the northbound express track descends to allow the northbound local to cross over it, before rising up at 110th Street, where the line becomes the standard four tracks side by side with the local tracks on the side and express tracks in the center.

The IRT Lenox Avenue Line passes underneath this station at the extreme north end on West 104th Street to 110th Street–Malcolm X Plaza. The line is not visible from the platforms. On the east side of Central Park West and West 104th Street, adjacent to Central Park, is an emergency exit enclosed in a small brick house for the IRT line, which passes underneath the station. From here the line curves northeast, running directly under Central Park's North Woods at this point.

=== Exit ===
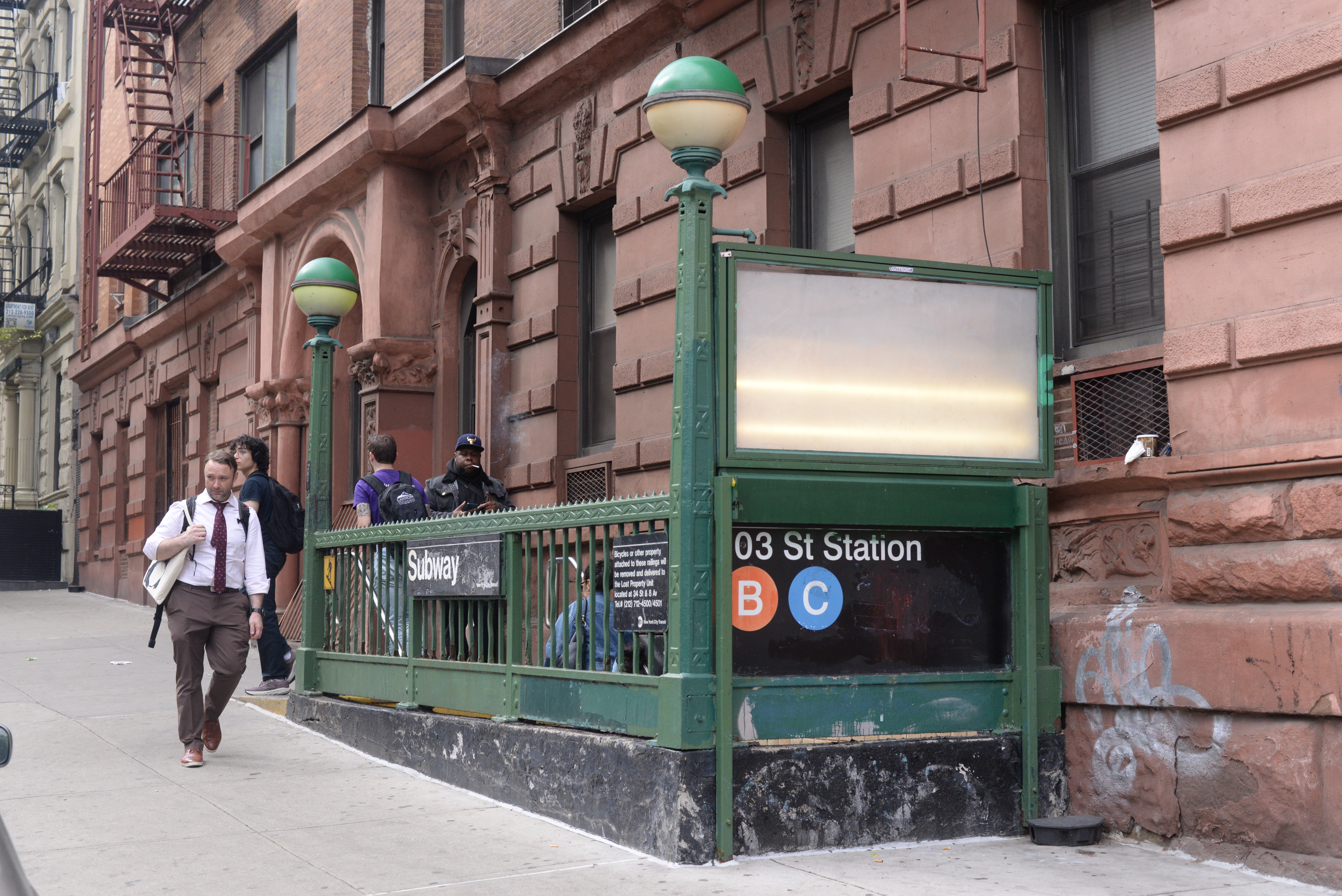
The only entrance, at 103rd St.

This station has one fare control area at the center of the upper-level platform. A single staircase connects the two platforms before a turnstile bank leads to a token booth and one staircase going up to the northwest corner of West 103rd Street and Central Park West. The station is unique in that it has only one open staircase to street level.

Directional signs that have been covered indicate that there were two more fare control areas. One exit at the extreme south end had two staircases going to southwestern corner of West 102nd Street and Central Park West, and the other at the extreme north end had two that went to both western corners of West 104th Street. Further evidence of these exits' existences includes new tiling on both levels, and doorways that lead to converted storage spaces on the upper level. The fare control area with stairs to West 104th Street was closed by 1940 and possibly as early as November 1932 - just two months after the opening of the station - due to frequent vandalism.
