= 110th Regiment of Foot =

Two regiments of the British Army have been numbered the 110th Regiment of Foot:

- 110th Regiment of Foot (Queen's Royal Musqueteers), raised in 1761
- 110th Regiment of Foot, raised in 1794
