= 86th Street station (IND Eighth Avenue Line) =

New York City Subway station in Manhattan

86 Street
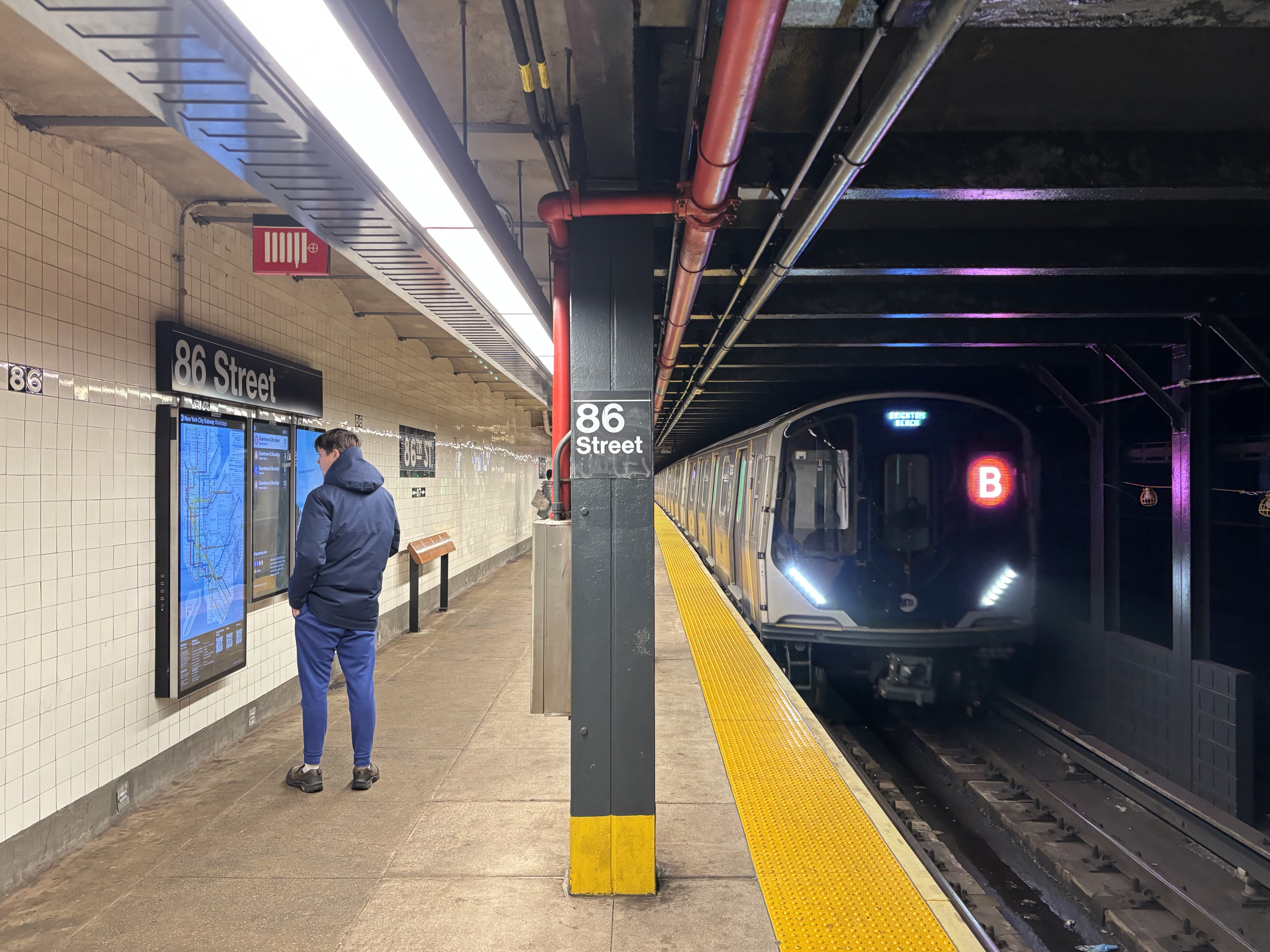
- Southbound R211A B train arriving

Station statistics
- Address: West 86th Street & Central Park West; New York, New York
- Borough: Manhattan
- Locale: Upper West Side
- Coordinates: 40.785286°N 73.969316°W
- Division: B (IND)
- Line: IND Eighth Avenue Line
- Services: A (late nights); B (weekdays during the day); C (all except late nights)
- Transit: NYCT Bus: M10, M86 SBS
- Structure: Underground
- Levels: 2
- Platforms: 2 side platforms (1 on each level)
- Tracks: 4 (2 on each level)

Other information
- Opened: September 10, 1932 (94 years ago)
- Closed: June 4, 2018; 8 years ago (reconstruction)
- Rebuilt: October 26, 2018; 7 years ago

Traffic
- 2025: 2,693,156 ▼0.1%
- Rank: 142 out of 423
Services
Preceding station	New York City Subway	Following station
96th Street A B C via 145th Street	Local	81st Street–Museum of Natural History A B C via 59th Street–Columbus Circle
does not stop here
Location
Location within New York City Subway
Location within New York City
Location within New York
Track layout
Street map
Station service legend
Symbol	Description
Stops all times except late nights	Stops all times except late nights
Stops late nights only	Stops late nights only
Stops weekdays during the day	Stops weekdays during the day

The 86th Street station is a local station on the IND Eighth Avenue Line of the New York City Subway. Located at Central Park West and 86th Street on the Upper West Side, it is served by the B train on weekdays and by the C train at all times except late nights, when the A train takes over service.

== History ==
New York City mayor John Francis Hylan's original plans for the Independent Subway System (IND), proposed in 1922, included building over 100 miles (160 km) of new lines and taking over nearly 100 miles (160 km) of existing lines. The lines were designed to compete with the existing underground, surface, and elevated lines operated by the Interborough Rapid Transit Company (IRT) and BMT. On December 9, 1924, the New York City Board of Transportation (BOT) gave preliminary approval for the construction of the IND Eighth Avenue Line. This line consisted of a corridor connecting Inwood, Manhattan, to Downtown Brooklyn, running largely under Eighth Avenue but also paralleling Greenwich Avenue and Sixth Avenue in Lower Manhattan. The BOT announced a list of stations on the new line in February 1928, with a local station at 86th Street.

The finishes at the five stations between 81st Street and 110th Street were 18 percent completed by May 1930. By that August, the BOT reported that the Eighth Avenue Line was nearly completed and that the five stations from 81st to 110th Street were 99 percent completed. The entire line was completed by September 1931, except for the installation of turnstiles. A preview event for the new subway was hosted on September 8, 1932, two days before the official opening. The 86th Street station opened on September 10, 1932, as part of the city-operated IND's initial segment, the Eighth Avenue Line between Chambers Street and 207th Street. Construction of the whole line cost $191.2 million (equivalent to $4,511.9 million in 2025). While the IRT Broadway–Seventh Avenue Line already provided parallel service, the new Eighth Avenue subway via Central Park West provided an alternative route.

Under the 2015–2019 MTA Capital Plan, the station underwent a complete overhaul as part of the Enhanced Station Initiative and was entirely closed for several months. Updates included cellular service, Wi-Fi, USB charging stations, interactive service advisories and maps. A request for proposals for the 72nd Street, 86th Street, Cathedral Parkway–110th Street, and 163rd Street–Amsterdam Avenue stations was issued on June 1, 2017, and the New York City Transit and Bus Committee officially recommended that the MTA Board award the $111 million contract to ECCO III Enterprises in October 2017. As part of the renovations, the station was closed from June 4, 2018, to October 26, 2018.

== Station layout ==
This underground station has two levels with northbound trains on the upper level and southbound trains on the lower one. From west to east, each level has one side platform, one local track and one express track.

The platforms have no tile band, but mosaic name tablets reading "86TH ST." in white sans-serif lettering on a midnight blue background with a black border are present. There are also small "86" tile captions and directional signs in white lettering on a black background. Grey (previously blue) I-beam columns run along both platforms at regular intervals with alternating ones having the standard black station name plate in white lettering.

=== Exits ===
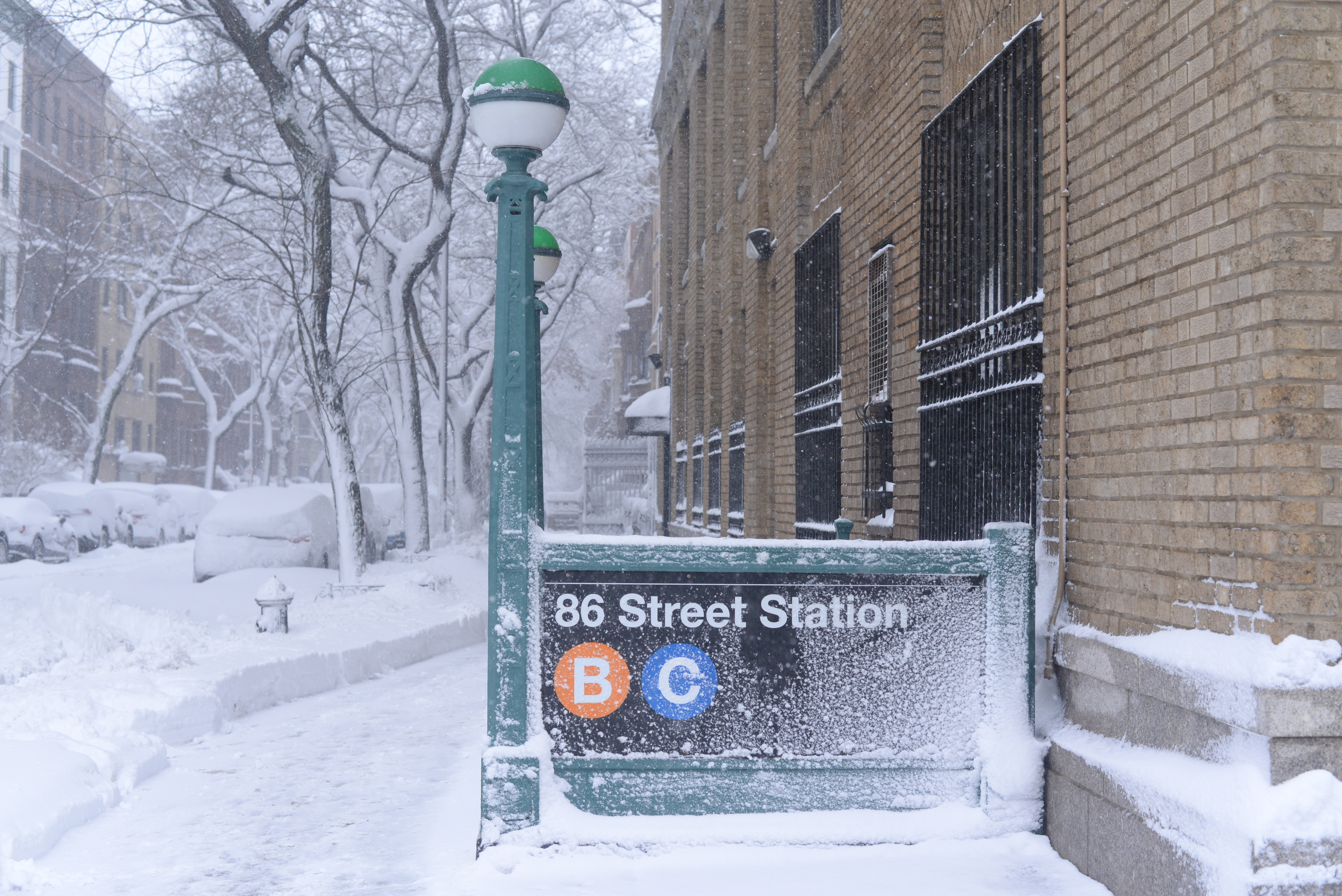
The 86th St station exit on 87th St and Central Park West.

This station has three fare control areas, all of which are on the upper level. The full-time one at 86th Street is at the south end and has a turnstile bank, token booth, and three street stairs. Two staircases lead to the southwest corner of Central Park West and 86th Street, and one leads to the northwest corner of that intersection. Right inside fare control, there is a staircase going down to the lower level. The station's other two entrances/exits are unstaffed. The one at 87th Street, at the center of the upper level, has a staircase connecting both platforms. The one street stair leads to the northwest corner of Central Park West and 87th Street. The third fare control area at 88th Street has three turnstiles and one gate, installed as part of the station's renovation. These replace the two HEET turnstiles and one exit-only turnstile which were present beforehand. There is one staircase leading to the northwest corner of Central Park West and 88th Street.
