= 72nd Street station (IND Eighth Avenue Line) =

New York City Subway station in Manhattan

72 Street
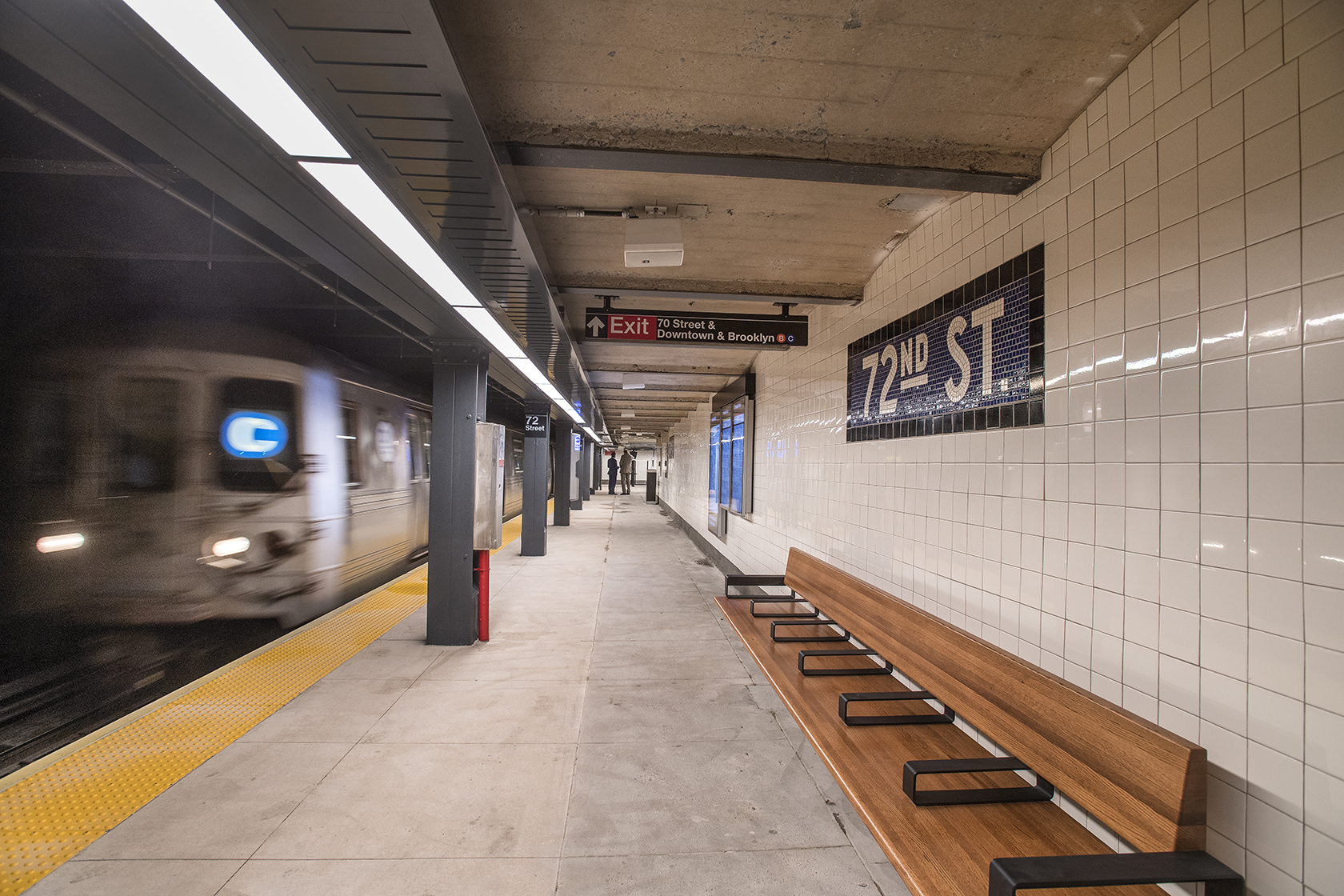
- R46 C train arriving on the upper level

Station statistics
- Address: West 72nd Street & Central Park West; New York, New York
- Borough: Manhattan
- Locale: Upper West Side
- Coordinates: 40.776154°N 73.976011°W
- Division: B (IND)
- Line: IND Eighth Avenue Line
- Services: A (late nights); B (weekdays during the day); C (all except late nights)
- Transit: NYCT Bus: M10, M72
- Structure: Underground
- Levels: 2
- Platforms: 2 side platforms (1 on each level)
- Tracks: 4 (2 on each level)

Other information
- Opened: September 10, 1932 (94 years ago)
- Closed: May 7, 2018; 8 years ago (reconstruction)
- Rebuilt: October 4, 2018; 8 years ago

Traffic
- 2025: 2,665,805 ▲0.6%
- Rank: 143 out of 423
Services
Preceding station	New York City Subway	Following station
81st Street–Museum of Natural History A B C via 145th Street	Local	59th Street–Columbus Circle A B C services split
does not stop here
Location
Location within New York City Subway
Location within New York City
Location within New York
Track layout
Street map
Station service legend
Symbol	Description
Stops all times except late nights	Stops all times except late nights
Stops late nights only	Stops late nights only
Stops weekdays during the day	Stops weekdays during the day

The 72nd Street station is a local station on the IND Eighth Avenue Line of the New York City Subway. It is located at 72nd Street and Central Park West on the Upper West Side. It is served by the B train on weekdays, and by the C train at all times except late nights, when the A train takes over service.

The Eighth Avenue Line station was built for the Independent Subway System (IND) and opened on September 10, 1932, as part of the IND's first segment. The station was renovated in 2018.

== History ==
New York City mayor John Francis Hylan's original plans for the Independent Subway System (IND), proposed in 1922, included building over 100 miles (160 km) of new lines and taking over nearly 100 miles (160 km) of existing lines. The lines were designed to compete with the existing underground, surface, and elevated lines operated by the Interborough Rapid Transit Company (IRT) and BMT. On December 9, 1924, the New York City Board of Transportation (BOT) gave preliminary approval for the construction of the IND Eighth Avenue Line. This line consisted of a corridor connecting Inwood, Manhattan, to Downtown Brooklyn, running largely under Eighth Avenue but also paralleling Greenwich Avenue and Sixth Avenue in Lower Manhattan. The BOT announced a list of stations on the new line in February 1928, with a local station at 70th Street.

In October 1928, the BOT awarded a $444,000 (equivalent to $8,325,000 in 2025) contract to Charles Mead & Co. for the completion of the 50th Street, 59th Street, and 72nd Street stations on the Eighth Avenue Line. The finishes at the three stations were 20 percent completed by May 1930. By that August, the BOT reported that the Eighth Avenue Line was nearly completed and that the three stations from 50th to 72nd Street were 99.9 percent completed. The entire line was completed by September 1931, except for the installation of turnstiles.

A preview event for the new subway was hosted on September 8, 1932, two days before the official opening. The 72nd Street station opened on September 10, 1932, as part of the city-operated IND's initial segment, the Eighth Avenue Line between Chambers Street and 207th Street. Construction of the whole line cost $191.2 million (equivalent to $4,511.9 million in 2025). While the IRT Broadway–Seventh Avenue Line already provided parallel service, the new Eighth Avenue subway via Central Park West provided an alternative route.

Under the 2015–2019 Metropolitan Transportation Authority Capital Plan, the station underwent a complete overhaul as part of the Enhanced Station Initiative and was entirely closed for several months. Updates included cellular service, Wi-Fi, USB charging stations, interactive service advisories and maps. A request for proposals for the 72nd Street, 86th Street, Cathedral Parkway–110th Street, and 163rd Street–Amsterdam Avenue stations was issued on June 1, 2017, and the New York City Transit and Bus Committee officially recommended that the MTA Board award the $111 million (equivalent to $145,794,868 in 2025) contract to ECCO III Enterprises in October 2017. As part of the renovations, the station was closed from May 7, 2018, to October 4, 2018.

== Station layout ==
This underground station has two levels, each of which has from west to east, one side platform, one local track and one express track. Northbound trains stop on the upper level while southbound trains stop on the lower level.

Both platforms lack a trim line, but have mosaic name tablets reading "72ND ST." in white sans-serif lettering on a midnight blue background and black border, as well as small "72" tile captions in white numbering on a black background at regular intervals. Directional signs in white lettering on a black background are below the name tablets. Mosaic signs in white lettering on a blue background on the upper level direct passengers to the staircases going down to the lower level. Grey (previously blue) I-beam columns run along the platforms at regular intervals, alternating ones having the standard black station name plate with white lettering.

72nd Street is the closest station to both the Dakota apartment building (which is immediately outside the station) and the Strawberry Fields memorial in Central Park. The 2018 artwork at this station is "SKY" by the multimedia artist Yoko Ono, who lived in the Dakota. The ceramic artwork consists of clouds against a blue backdrop. "SKY" commemorates Ono's husband John Lennon, who was killed in 1980 outside the Dakota.

=== Exits ===
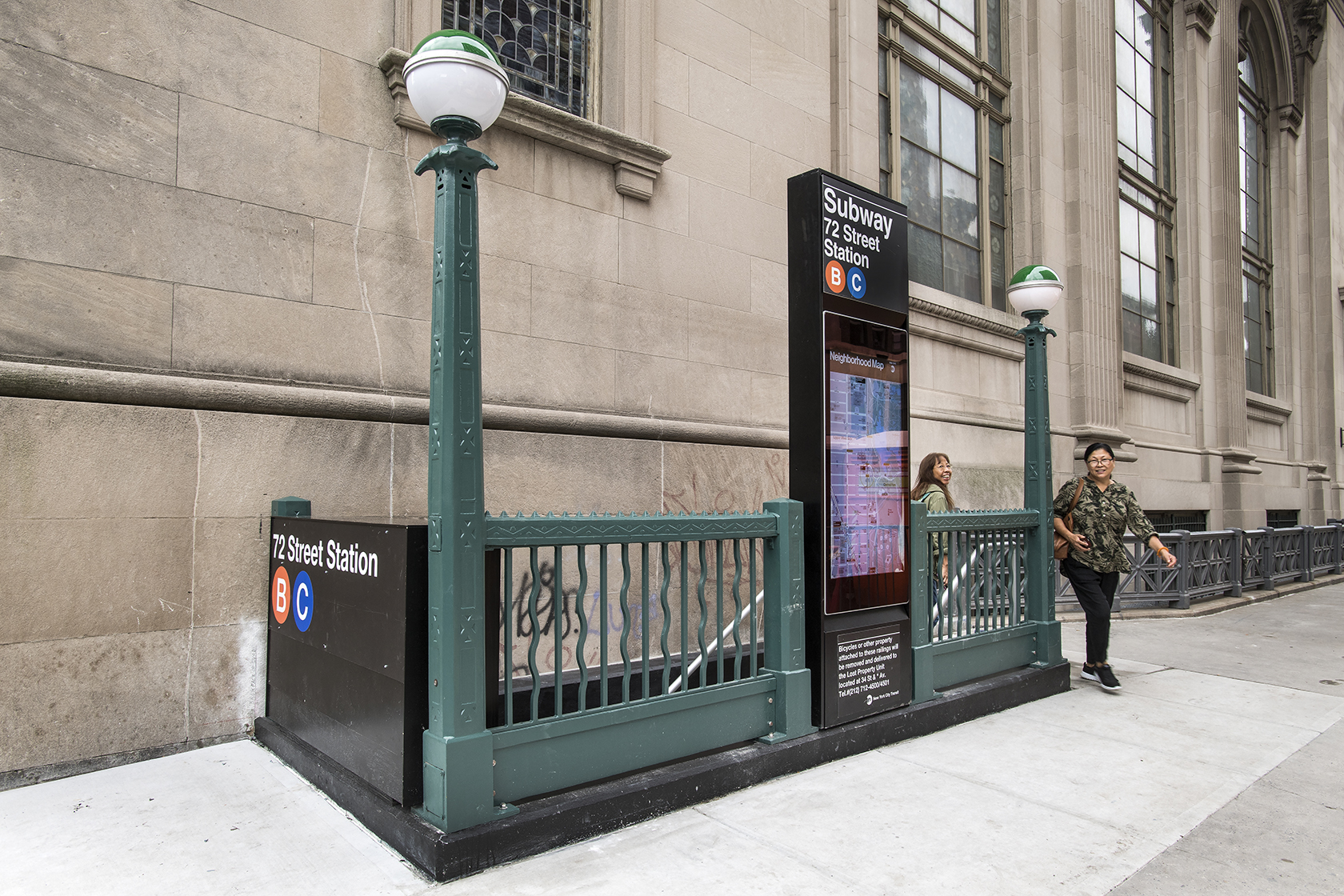
Entrance at 72nd Street following the renovations

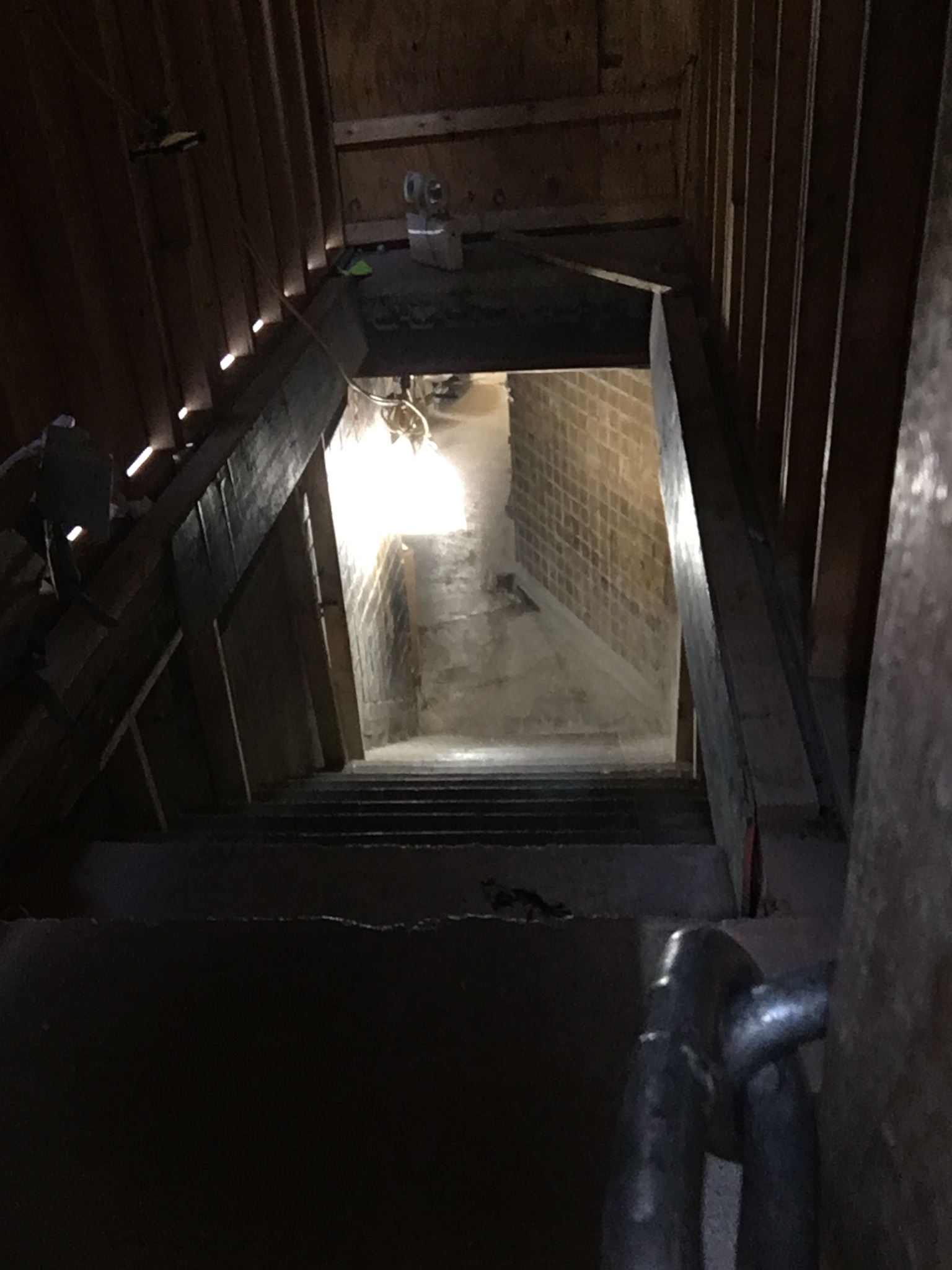
Closed 71st Street entrance

Both fare control areas are on the upper-level platform and two staircases, one adjacent to each area, go down to the lower level. The full-time one at 72nd Street is at the north end of the platform. A staircase of four steps go down to a bank of three turnstiles that lead to a token booth. The other fare control area at 70th Street, at the station's south end, remains unstaffed after renovations, but now contains standard turnstiles instead of High Entry/Exit Turnstiles.

Two staircases connect the two platforms, one at each fare control area, and one more used to connect the platforms in the center of the station. There are staircases to both western corners of West 72nd Street and Central Park West. The northwest staircase, outside the Dakota apartment building, is made of stone and is embedded within the Dakota's recessed areaway. In addition, there is an entrance to the southwestern corner of West 70th Street and Central Park West. This entrance had previously been closed, but reopened in September 2002.

Blue plywood walls and new tiling with a door on the upper level indicate there was a third exit that led to West 71st Street. Prior to the renovation of the station, further evidence of this exit's existence included directional signs with "71" that were covered or replaced with newer tiling and a fenced off staircase on the lower level. During the renovation of the station, the exit and its accompanying staircase between the two platform levels was temporarily uncovered and used as an area to haul out construction debris; the street staircase has since been re-sealed and the staircase between the two platform levels was closed again.
