= 110th Street =

110th Street may refer to:

== Streets ==
- 110th Street (Manhattan), a major east–west street in Manhattan, New York City

== Stations ==
- Cathedral Parkway–110th Street station (IRT Broadway–Seventh Avenue Line), serving the 1 train
- Cathedral Parkway–110th Street station (IND Eighth Avenue Line), serving the A, B, and C trains
- 110th Street–Malcolm X Plaza station, serving the 2 and 3 trains
- 110th Street station (IRT Lexington Avenue Line), serving the 4, 6, and <6> trains
- 110th Street station (IRT Ninth Avenue Line), former station

== See also ==
- Across 110th Street, a 1972 American action-crime film
- "Across 110th Street" (song), a song by Bobby Womack from the soundtrack and film of the same name
