= M96 and M106 buses =

Bus routes in Manhattan, New York

m96, m106
- 96th Street Crosstown
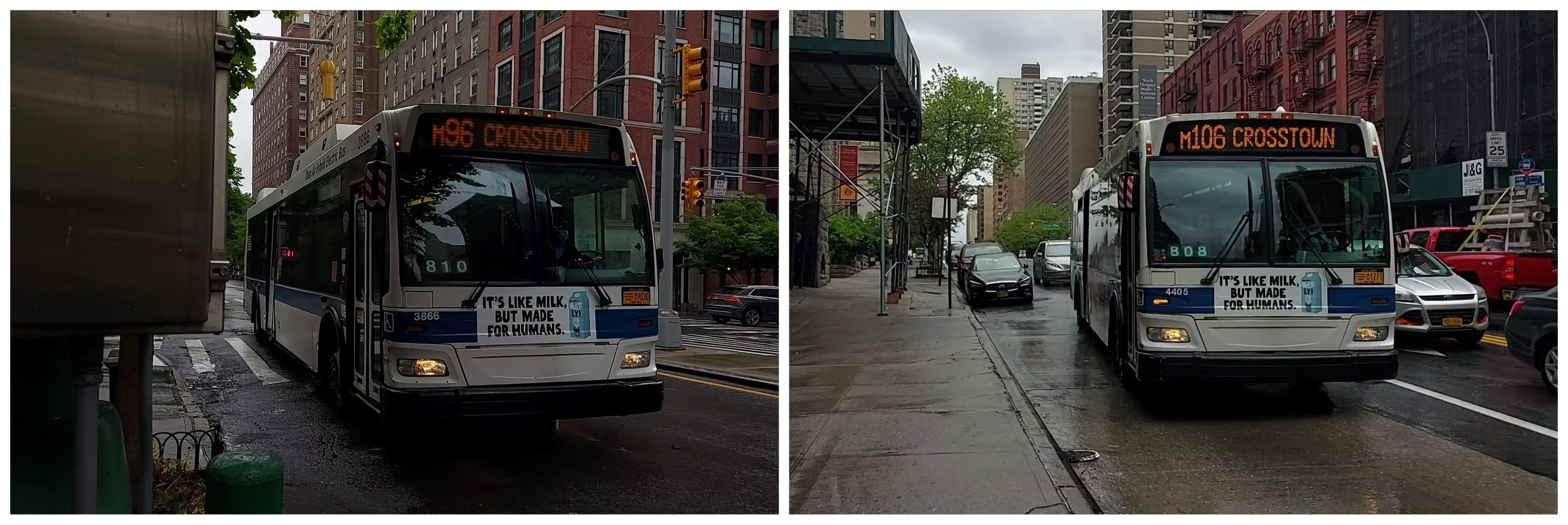
- Two Orion VII NG HEVs: a 2008 model (3866) on the M96 and a 2009 model (4405) on the M106. Both buses are retired.

Overview
- System: MTA Regional Bus Operations
- Operator: Manhattan and Bronx Surface Transit Operating Authority
- Garage: Manhattanville Depot
- Vehicle: Orion VII NG HEV; Nova Bus LFS HEV; New Flyer Xcelsior XDE40
- Began service: May 1993 (M96); 1996 (M106)

Route
- Locale: Manhattan
- Communities served: Upper West Side, Yorkville, Upper East Side, East Harlem
- Start: Upper West Side - 96th Street & West End Avenue
- Via: West 96th Street, East 96th Street (M96), East 106th Street (M106)
- End: Yorkville - East 97th Street & 1st Avenue (M96); East Harlem - East 105th Street & FDR Drive (M106)
- Length: 1.8 miles (2.9 km) (M96); 2.5 miles (4.0 km) (M106)

Service
- Operates: 24 hours (M96); All times except evenings and late nights (M106)
- Annual patronage: 3,121,884 (M96) (2025); 457,884 (M106) (2025)
- Transfers: Yes
- Timetable: M96 M106

The M96 and M106 constitute a pair of bus routes in Manhattan, running between Upper West Side and primarily on West 96th Street and East 96th Street to the Upper East Side or East 106th Street to East Harlem.

== Route description ==
The M96 begins at 96th Street and West End Avenue. They then continue eastbound to Central Park West onto the 97th Street Transverse, with the westbound M96 exiting at 97th Street and using Central Park West to dogleg turn onto 96th Street and later turning off 96th Street at Broadway, and using 97th Street and West End Avenue to loop back to 96th Street. The M96 then continues east on 96th Street to 1st Avenue, with the westbound M96 once again leaving 96th Street at Madison Avenue to dogleg turn on 97th Street to access the westbound 97th Street Transverse. The M96 then takes a left turn at 1st Avenue, and then again at 97th Street, to terminate on 97th Street in front of the Metropolitan Hospital. Westbound M96 dogleg turn onto 96th Street using 2nd Avenue to resume service.

Some M96 runs begin at 1st Avenue and 99th Street when school is in session and use 101st Street and then 2nd Avenue to return to normal routing.

The M106 diverges from the M96 at Fifth and Madison Avenues, using 5th Avenue westbound and Madison Avenue eastbound until 106th Street, where it turns onto 106th Street and runs on the street until 1st Avenue, where the eastbound M106 continues east on 106th Street, right on FDR Drive, and west on 105th Street to terminate directly after turning onto 105th Street. The westbound M106 returns to 106th Street by utilizing a dogleg turn on 1st Avenue to resume service.

Along both routes, there are several connections to the New York City Subway at:

- Broadway
- Central Park West
- Lexington Avenue (M96)
- Second Avenue-96th Street (M96)

In the future, when the second phase of the Second Avenue Subway opens, a station is planned on Second Avenue-106th Street.

== History ==
The New York City Department of Plant and Structures began operating a bus route designated the M6 – which soon became NYCO's 19 on July 1, 1921. It was operated by Green Bus Lines from 1933 to 1936, when it was taken over by the New York City Omnibus Corporation on June 22, 1936.

The Manhattan and Bronx Surface Transit Operating Authority began operating a bus route on September 10, 1962, designated as the M107, on a six-month trial basis. Bus service ran every 15 minutes between 6:30 a.m. and 10:30 p.m. from Monday through Saturday, and 30 minutes during these hours on Sundays and holidays. It originally ran from 106th Street and the FDR Drive to 110th Street and Riverside Drive. In the 1963 fiscal year, this route was extended at the request of residents along the route. On May 24, 1964, it was truncated to run solely on 106th Street between 5th Avenue and FDR Drive. The M107 became a branch of the M19 on January 7, 1974, and in May 1993, the main branch of the M19 was relabeled to the M96, and three years later, in 1996, the 106th Street branch of the M96 was relabeled to the M106, and on this same date, it was rerouted to use Fifth and Madison Avenues between 96th/97th Streets and 106th Street instead of Lexington and Third Avenues.

The M96 was set to become the next route to be converted to Select Bus Service after the M14, with implementation set for 2019, but was pushed back due to budget constraints.
