= 163rd Street–Amsterdam Avenue station =

New York City Subway station in Manhattan

163 Street–Amsterdam Avenue
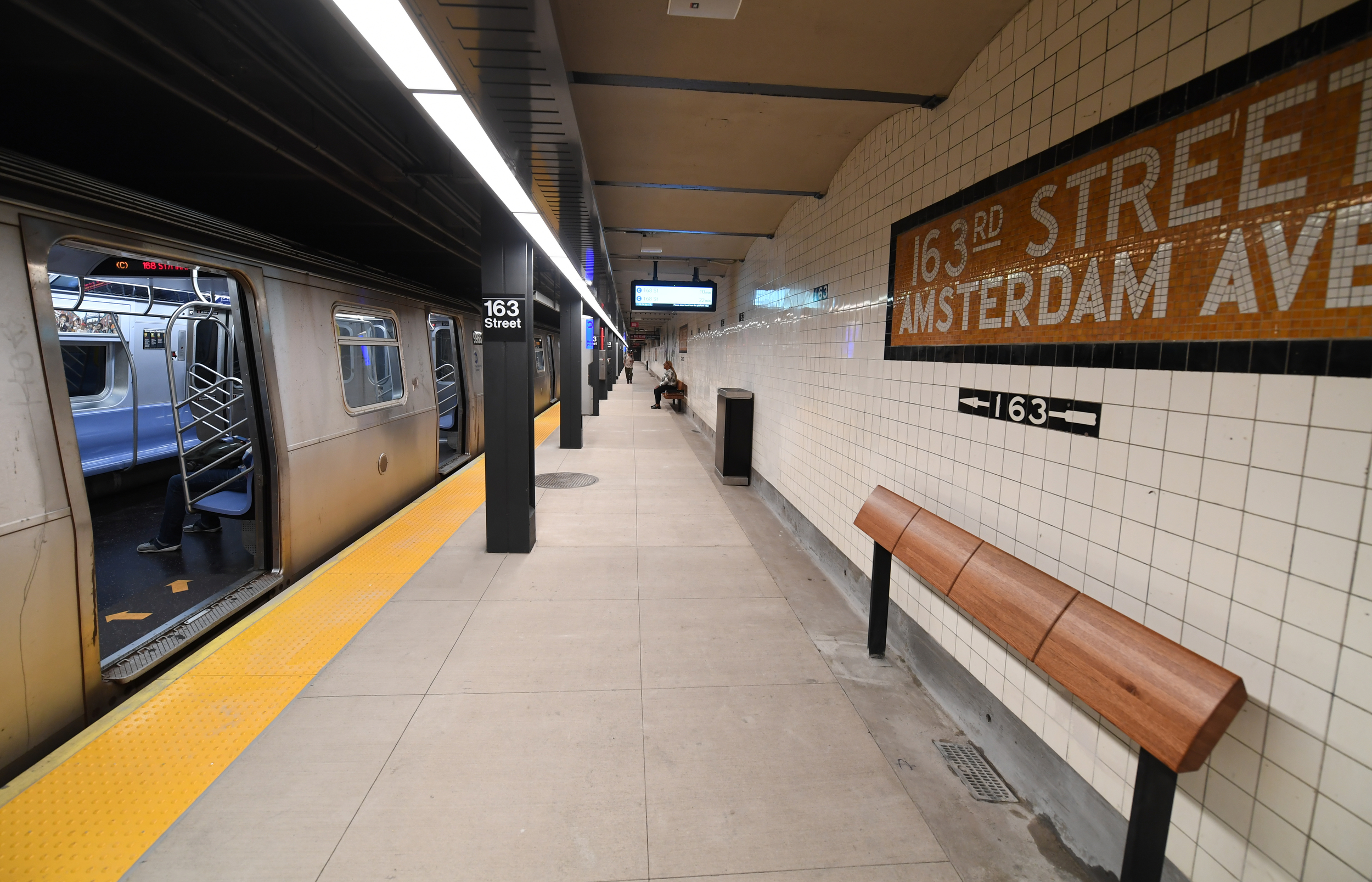
- Uptown platform after renovation

Station statistics
- Address: Amsterdam Avenue & St. Nicholas Avenue; New York, New York
- Borough: Manhattan
- Locale: Washington Heights
- Coordinates: 40.836866°N 73.940134°W
- Division: B (IND)
- Line: IND Eighth Avenue Line
- Services: A (late nights); C (all except late nights)
- Transit: NYCT Bus: M3, M100, M101
- Structure: Underground
- Platforms: 2 side platforms
- Tracks: 4 (2 on each level)

Other information
- Opened: September 10, 1932 (94 years ago)
- Closed: March 12, 2018; 8 years ago (reconstruction)
- Rebuilt: September 27, 2018; 8 years ago

Traffic
- 2025: 930,777 ▲4.8%
- Rank: 326 out of 423
Services
Preceding station	New York City Subway	Following station
168th Street A C Terminus	Local	155th Street A C toward Euclid Avenue
Location
Location within New York City Subway
Location within New York City
Location within New York
Track layout
Street map
Station service legend
Symbol	Description
Stops all times except late nights	Stops all times except late nights
Stops late nights only	Stops late nights only

The 163rd Street–Amsterdam Avenue station is a local station on the IND Eighth Avenue Line of the New York City Subway, located in Washington Heights, Manhattan, at the intersection of Amsterdam and Saint Nicholas Avenues. It is served by the C train at all times except late nights, when the A train takes over service.

== History ==
The station opened on September 10, 1932, as part of the city-operated Independent Subway System (IND)'s initial segment, the Eighth Avenue Line between Chambers Street and 207th Street. Construction of the whole line cost $191.2 million (equivalent to $4,511.9 million in 2025. While the IRT Broadway–Seventh Avenue Line already provided service to Washington Heights, the new Eighth Avenue subway via St. Nicholas Avenue provided an alternative route.

Under the 2015–2019 MTA Capital Plan, the station underwent a complete overhaul as part of the Enhanced Station Initiative and was entirely closed for several months. Updates included cellular service, Wi-Fi, USB charging stations, interactive service advisories and maps. A request for proposals for the 72nd Street, 86th Street, Cathedral Parkway–110th Street, and 163rd Street–Amsterdam Avenue stations was issued on June 1, 2017, and the New York City Transit and Bus Committee officially recommended that the MTA Board should award the $111 million contract to ECCO III Enterprises in October 2017. As part of the renovations, the station was closed on March 12, 2018 and reopened on September 27, 2018.

== Station layout ==
This underground station has two local tracks and two side platforms. Two express tracks, used by the A train during daytime hours, run below the station and are not visible from the platforms. To the north, the upper level local tracks become the center tracks of 168th Street, allowing C trains to terminate there, while the lower level express tracks become the outer tracks, continuing towards 207th Street.

Both platforms have mosaic name tablets reading "163RD STREET - AMSTERDAM AVE." in white sans-serif lettering broken onto two lines. The background is yellow with a black border. Small black "163" and directional signs in white lettering run at regular intervals, but there is no trim line on either platform. Grey (previously yellow) I-beam columns run along both platforms, alternating ones having the standard black station name plate with white lettering. The trim line was part of a color-coded tile system used throughout the IND. The tile colors were designed to facilitate navigation for travelers going away from Lower Manhattan. As such, the yellow tiles used at the 163rd Street station were originally also used at 145th Street, the next express station to the south, while a different tile color is used at 168th Street, the next express station to the north. Yellow tiles are similarly used at the 155th Street station, the only other local station between 145th Street and 168th Street.

This station has a full-length mezzanine supported by I-beam columns above the platforms, but only the southern half is opened. The open southern half has three staircases from each platform, black I-beams, and two sets of turnstile banks leading to the center or the extreme south end of the mezzanine. The closed northern half is walled off and retained the original yellow-colored I-beams. The staircases from the platforms to this portion have been removed.

Prior to the station's renovation, the open southern half was split into three sections by two black steel fences, and free transfers between directions were not possible. Outside fare control, there is a token booth. The closed northern half was gated off and had an exit-only turnstile leading to the fare control area at the center, and three gated staircases from each platform.

The 2018 artwork at this station is Ciguapa Antellana, me llamo sueño de la madrugada. (who more sci-fi than us), a glass mosaic by Firelei Báez. The artwork consists of four pieces, two on the mezzanine and one on each platform. The mosaic contains leaves and vines, as well as symbolism that is evocative of Baez's Caribbean ancestry.

=== Exits ===
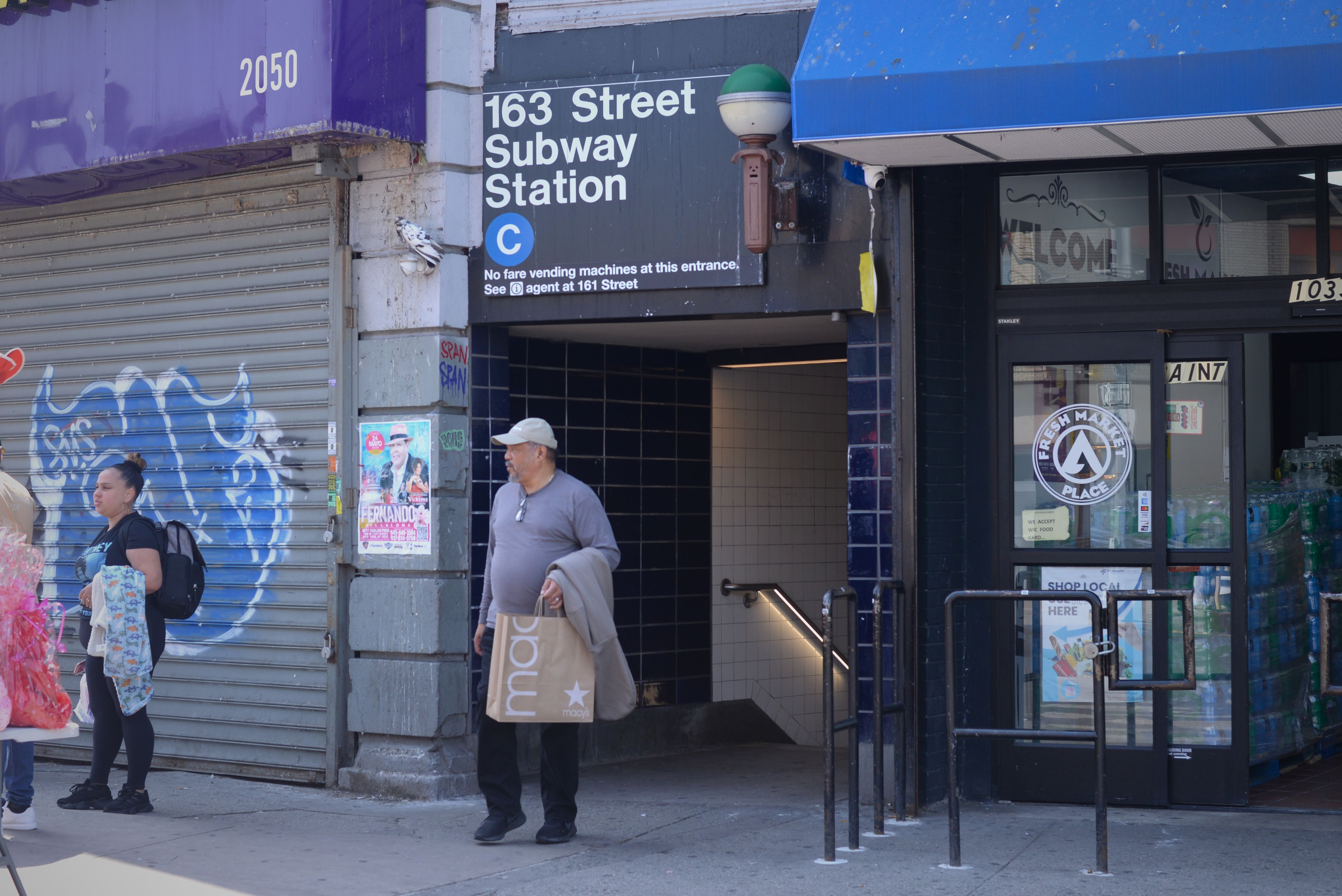
In-building entrance at 162nd St.

Despite the station's name, there is no longer an open exit to 163rd Street. The closed northern half had three exits leading to 163rd Street. By the late 1980s, the exits were closed and eventually sealed. Two of the exits went to the southwest corner, while the third exit, which was temporarily uncovered as an area to haul out debris from renovations, went to the southeast corner.

The open southern half of the mezzanine has three exits:

- One stair at the southeast corner of 161st Street and Amsterdam Avenue.
- One stair at the northeast corner of 161st Street and St. Nicholas Avenue.
- One stair built inside 1033 Saint Nicholas Avenue (at the western corner of 162nd Street and Amsterdam Avenue)
