= 110th Division =

110th Division or 110th Infantry Division may refer to:

- 110th Division (People's Republic of China)
- 110th Infantry Division (Wehrmacht), Germany
- 110th Division (Imperial Japanese Army)
- 110th Cavalry Division, Soviet Union
- 110th Guards Rifle Division, Soviet Union
- 110th Rifle Division, Soviet Union

== See also ==
- List of military divisions by number
- 110th Brigade (disambiguation)
- 110th Regiment (disambiguation)
- 110th Squadron (disambiguation)
- 110th (disambiguation)
