= 110 Squadron =

110 Squadron or 110th Squadron may refer to:

- 110 Squadron (Israel), a unit of the Israeli Air Force
- No. 110 Squadron RAF, a unit of the United Kingdom Royal Air Force
- 110th Bomb Squadron, a unit of the United States Air Force

== See also ==
- 110th Division (disambiguation)
- 110th Regiment (disambiguation)
