= 110th Regiment =

110th Regiment or 110th Infantry Regiment may refer to:

- 110th Cavalry Regiment
- 110th Infantry Regiment (United States)
- 110th Mahratta Light Infantry, a unit of the British Indian Army
- 110th Regiment of Foot (Queen's Royal Musqueteers), a unit of the British Army
- 110th Regiment of Foot (1794), a unit of the British Army
- 110th Regiment Royal Armoured Corps
- 110th Light Anti-Aircraft Regiment, Royal Artillery
- 110th (Manchester) Field Regiment, Royal Artillery

== American Civil War regiments ==
- 110th Illinois Infantry Regiment
- 110th New York Infantry Regiment
- 110th Ohio Infantry
- 110th Pennsylvania Infantry Regiment
- 110th United States Colored Infantry Regiment

== See also ==
- 110th Brigade (disambiguation)
- 110th Division (disambiguation)
- 110th Squadron (disambiguation)
