= 81st Street–Museum of Natural History station =

New York City Subway station in Manhattan

81 Street– Museum of Natural History
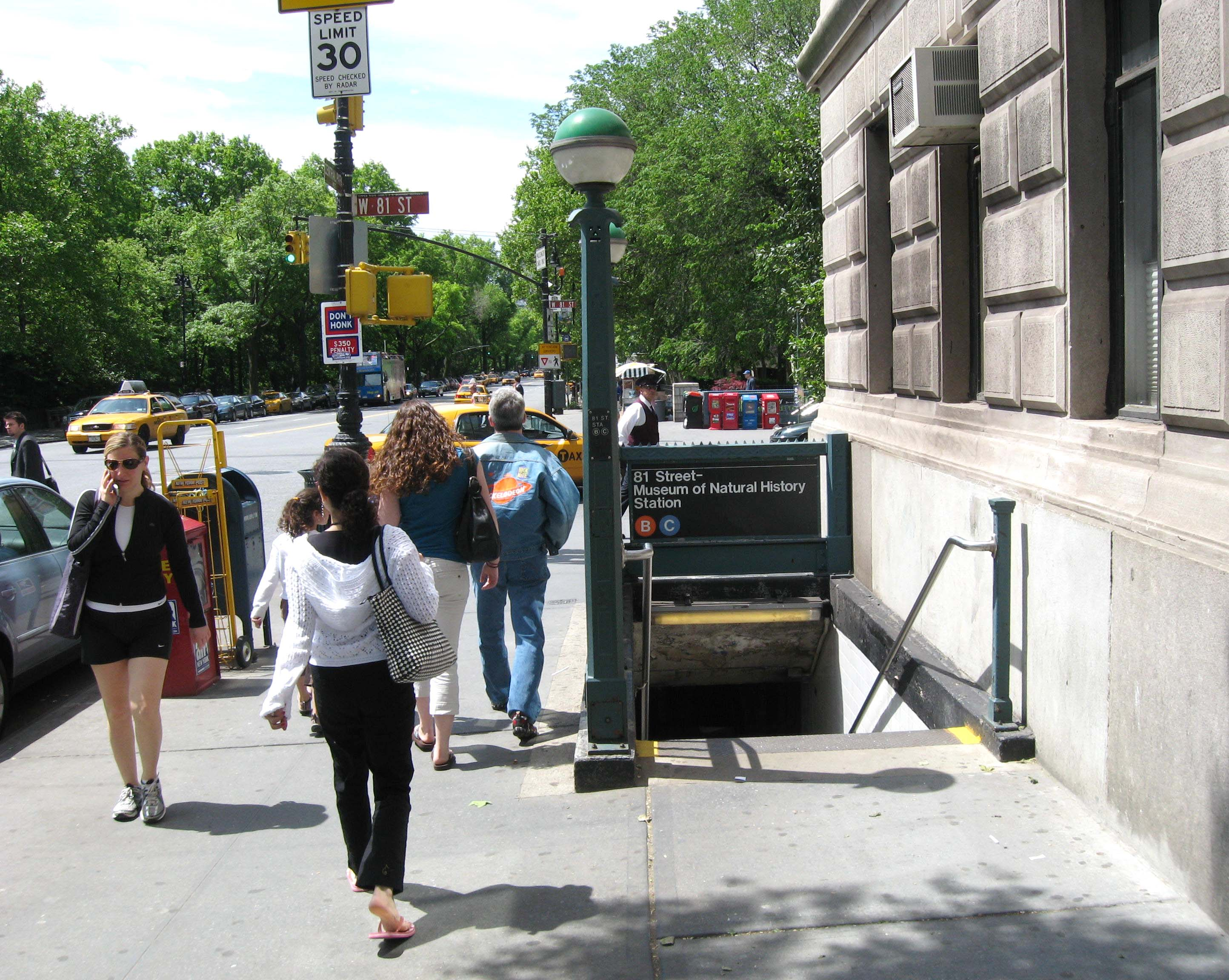
- Northwest entrance

Station statistics
- Address: West 81st Street & Central Park West; New York, New York
- Borough: Manhattan
- Locale: Upper West Side
- Coordinates: 40.781971°N 73.971763°W
- Division: B (IND)
- Line: IND Eighth Avenue Line
- Services: A (late nights); B (weekdays during the day); C (all except late nights)
- Transit: NYCT Bus: M10, M79 SBS; MTA Bus: BxM2
- Structure: Underground
- Levels: 2
- Platforms: 2 side platforms (1 on each level)
- Tracks: 4 (2 on each level)

Other information
- Opened: September 10, 1932 (94 years ago)
- Accessible: No; under construction

Traffic
- 2025: 3,503,727 ▼2.6%
- Rank: 103 out of 423
Services
Preceding station	New York City Subway	Following station
86th Street A B C via 145th Street	Local	72nd Street A B C via 59th Street–Columbus Circle
does not stop here
Location
Location within New York City Subway
Location within New York City
Location within New York
Track layout
Street map
Station service legend
Symbol	Description
Stops all times except late nights	Stops all times except late nights
Stops late nights only	Stops late nights only
Stops weekdays during the day	Stops weekdays during the day

The 81st Street–Museum of Natural History station is a local station on the IND Eighth Avenue Line of the New York City Subway. It is served by the B train on weekdays and by the C train at all times except late nights, when the A train takes over service.

== History ==
New York City mayor John Francis Hylan's original plans for the Independent Subway System (IND), proposed in 1922, included building over 100 miles (160 km) of new lines and taking over nearly 100 miles (160 km) of existing lines. The lines were designed to compete with the existing underground, surface, and elevated lines operated by the Interborough Rapid Transit Company (IRT) and BMT. On December 9, 1924, the New York City Board of Transportation (BOT) gave preliminary approval for the construction of the IND Eighth Avenue Line. This line consisted of a corridor connecting Inwood, Manhattan, to Downtown Brooklyn, running largely under Eighth Avenue but also paralleling Greenwich Avenue and Sixth Avenue in Lower Manhattan. The BOT announced a list of stations on the new line in February 1928, with a local station at 79th Street (corresponding to the American Museum of Natural History's main entrance).

The finishes at the five stations between 81st Street and 110th Street were 18 percent completed by May 1930. By that August, the BOT reported that the Eighth Avenue Line was nearly completed and that the five stations from 81st to 110th Street were 99 percent completed. The entire line was completed by September 1931, except for the installation of turnstiles. A preview event for the new subway was hosted on September 8, 1932, two days before the official opening. The 81st Street station opened on September 10, 1932, as part of the city-operated IND's initial segment, the Eighth Avenue Line between Chambers Street and 207th Street. Construction of the whole line cost $191.2 million (equivalent to $4,511.9 million in 2025. While the IRT Broadway–Seventh Avenue Line already provided parallel service, the new Eighth Avenue subway via Central Park West provided an alternative route.

The station was renovated in 1998–2000, in coordination with the building of the new Hayden Planetarium, within the Rose Center for Earth and Space. The floors were replaced, new lighting was installed, the token booth was upgraded, and the walls and staircases were re-tiled. Structural improvements were also made during the renovation. In 2019, the Metropolitan Transportation Authority announced that the station would become ADA-accessible as part of the agency's 2020–2024 Capital Program.

A request for proposals was put out on May 18, 2023 for the contract for a project bundle to make 13 stations accessible, including 81st Street. The contract to add one elevator (street-to-northbound platform-to southbound platform outside fare control) at the station was awarded in December 2023.

The work would include upgrades to electrical systems and the removal or relocation of some artwork. By mid-2024, the work was expected to be completed by 2026.

== Station layout ==
This underground station has four tracks and two side platforms. On this section of the line, the local tracks are stacked, uptown above downtown, and the express tracks are stacked in the same order to the east of them, so both platforms are on the west side, one above the other. The station is at Central Park West and 81st Street, rather than the major crosstown 79th Street, in order to accommodate the American Museum of Natural History, which largely fills the area of what was once called the Manhattan Square. The 79th Street Transverse Road, through Central Park, exits the park here.

South of this station are storage/lay up tracks between the local and express tracks on each level. Both ends of the tracks merge with the express tracks, with switches to the local tracks.

=== Exits ===
There are two fare control areas, both on the upper platform. One is at the station's extreme south end, on Central Park West midblock between 77th and 81st Streets. From this fare control, a passageway leads to a staircase on the west side of Central Park West, just south of the American Museum of Natural History's front entrance. This fare control also has an underground entrance directly into the museum's lowest level. The other is at the station's north end, at Central Park West and West 81st Street. There is one staircase each to the northwest and southwest corners of the intersection.

== Artwork ==
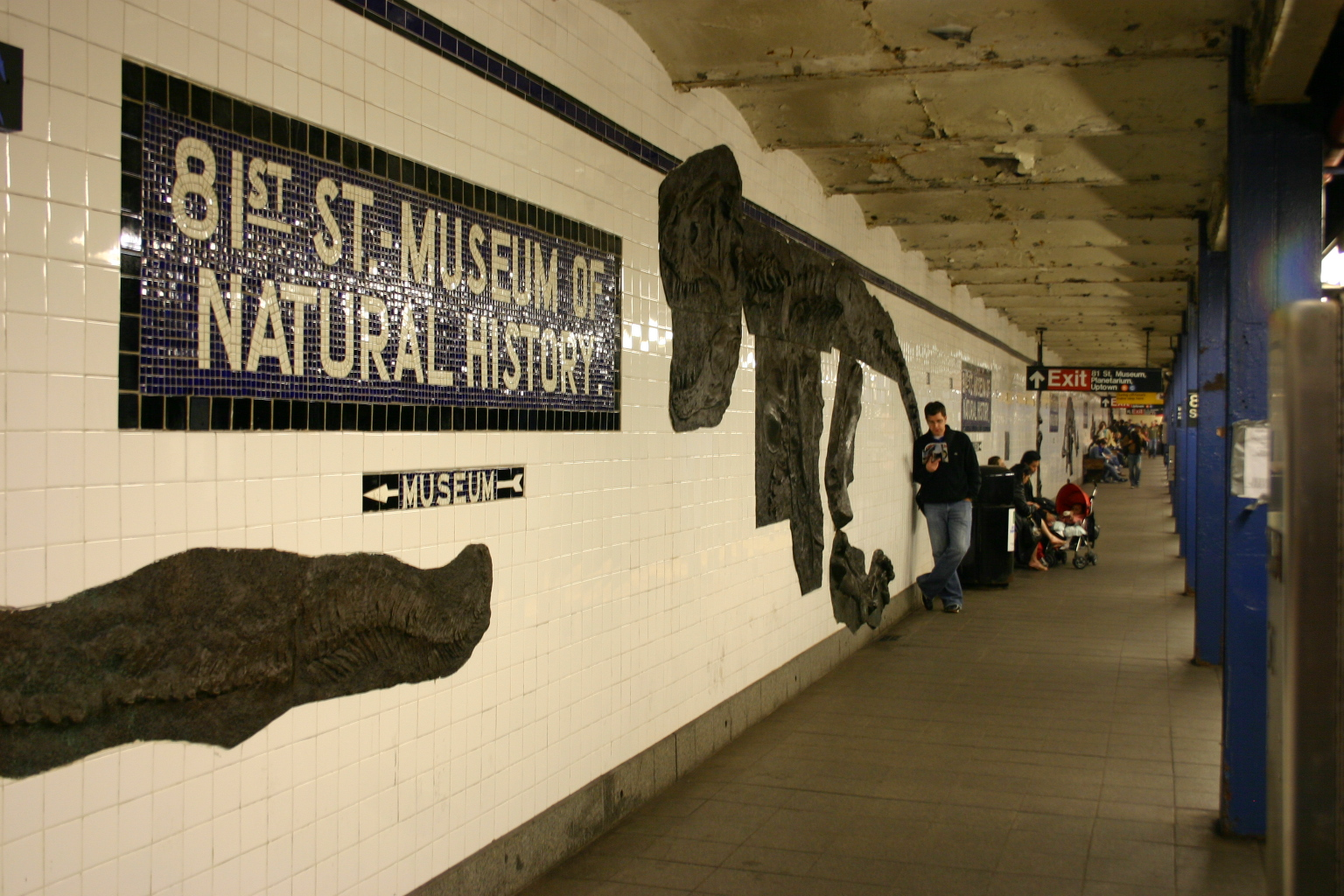
Dinosaur artwork on the lower level wall

In 1976, with funding from the Exxon Corporation, this station, as well as three others citywide, received new "artfully humorous graffiti" murals and artwork. Local designer Mayers and Schiff received $5,000 to add murals of dinosaurs such as "Thesaurus Rex, the dinosaur that had a vocabulary of a thousand words" and "Elongatomus, an elongated critter that stretched from coast to coast whose pelvic remains support a highway interchange in Missouri."

As part of the 1998–2000 station renovation, a program of tile mosaics was undertaken, covering the stairs and platforms, extending to floor inlays. Stairwells evoke descending into the geological strata of the Earth (at 81st Street) or into the Ocean (79th Street). Many creatures are evoked in mosaic vignettes that punctuate the stretches of white tiled wall. Fossil casts seem to emerge from the tiles as though the subway platform itself were an excavation, which it actually is. Under the Metropolitan Transportation Authority (MTA)'s Arts for Transit program, a mixed-media installation was created in 2000. Entitled "For Want of a Nail", named after the old proverb, it addresses the interconnections of entities that are as vast as a galaxy and as small as a single cell. Using ceramic tile, glass tile, glass mosaic, bronze relief, and granite as primary materials, the design team depicted the evolution of extinct, existing, and endangered life forms, from single-celled organisms to the towering T. rex dinosaur. It shows images and symbols ranging from the Earth's core, to the sea, the sky and the cosmos beyond. No artist has been identified in this group project.

== In media ==
The station has been featured in the 2002 film Men in Black II. The station was also mentioned in Night at the Museum.
