= Cathedral Parkway–110th Street station (IND Eighth Avenue Line) =

New York City Subway station in Manhattan

Cathedral Parkway–110 Street
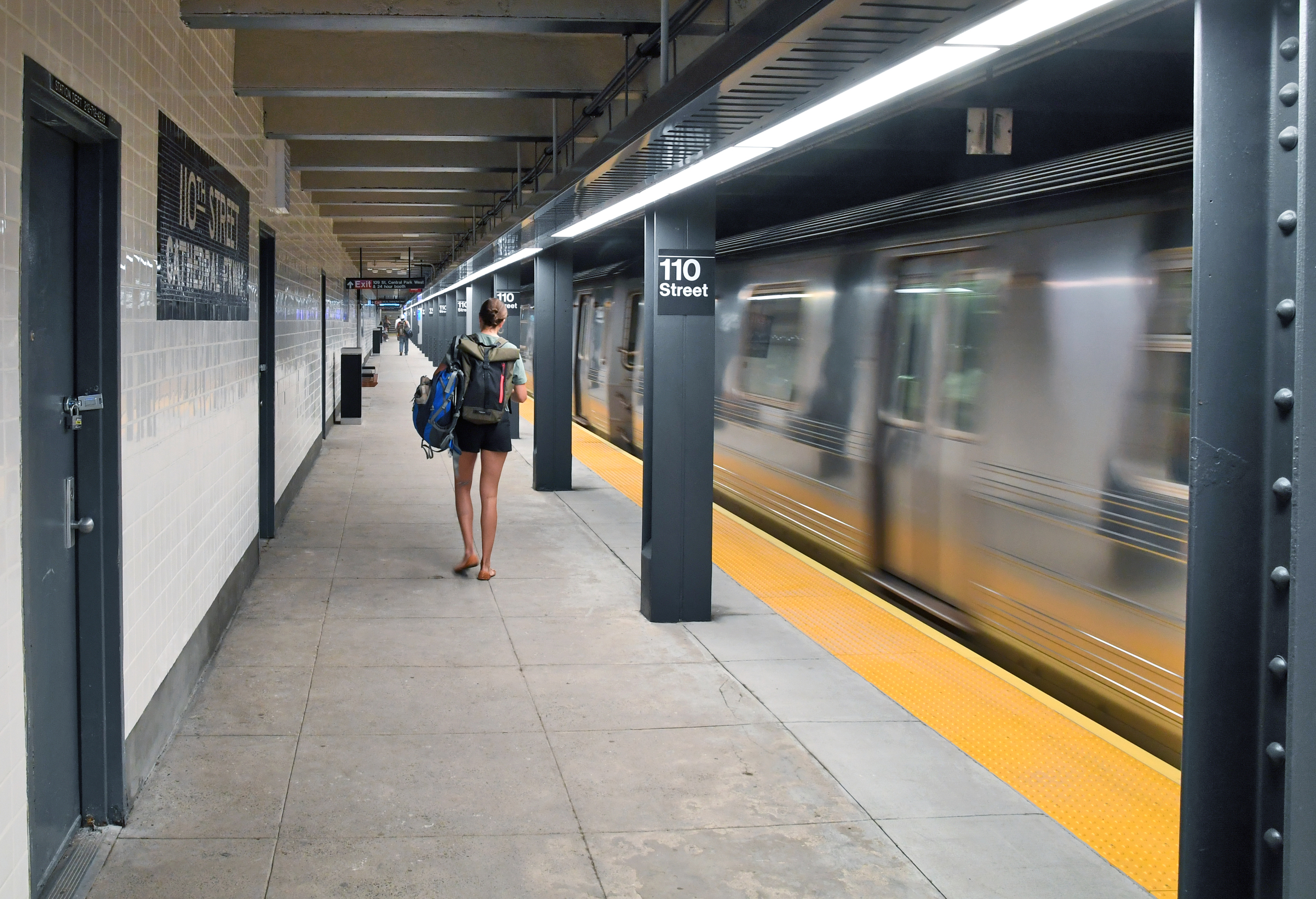
- Northbound platform with an R68A B train

Station statistics
- Address: West 110th Street (Cathedral Parkway) & Frederick Douglass Boulevard; New York, New York
- Borough: Manhattan
- Locale: Upper West Side, Harlem, Morningside Heights
- Coordinates: 40.800524°N 73.958244°W
- Division: B (IND)
- Line: IND Eighth Avenue Line
- Services: A (late nights); B (weekdays during the day); C (all except late nights)
- Transit: NYCT Bus: M3, M4, M10
- Structure: Underground
- Platforms: 2 side platforms
- Tracks: 4

Other information
- Opened: September 10, 1932; 94 years ago
- Closed: April 9, 2018; 8 years ago (reconstruction)
- Rebuilt: September 2, 2018; 8 years ago

Traffic
- 2025: 1,862,765 ▲4.9%
- Rank: 189 out of 423
Services
Preceding station	New York City Subway	Following station
116th Street A B C via 145th Street	Local	103rd Street A B C via 59th Street–Columbus Circle
does not stop here
Location
Location within New York City Subway
Location within New York City
Location within New York
Track layout
Street map
Station service legend
Symbol	Description
Stops all times except late nights	Stops all times except late nights
Stops late nights only	Stops late nights only
Stops weekdays during the day	Stops weekdays during the day

The Cathedral Parkway–110th Street station is a local station on the IND Eighth Avenue Line of the New York City Subway. It is located on the Upper West Side of Manhattan, at West 110th Street and Frederick Douglass Boulevard at the northwest corner of Central Park. The station is served by the B train on weekdays and by the C train at all times except late nights, when the A train takes over service.

== History ==
New York City mayor John Francis Hylan's original plans for the Independent Subway System (IND), proposed in 1922, included building over 100 miles (160 km) of new lines and taking over nearly 100 miles (160 km) of existing lines. The lines were designed to compete with the existing underground, surface, and elevated lines operated by the Interborough Rapid Transit Company (IRT) and BMT. On December 9, 1924, the New York City Board of Transportation (BOT) gave preliminary approval for the construction of the IND Eighth Avenue Line. This line consisted of a corridor connecting Inwood, Manhattan, to Downtown Brooklyn, running largely under Eighth Avenue but also paralleling Greenwich Avenue and Sixth Avenue in Lower Manhattan. The BOT announced a list of stations on the new line in February 1928, with a local station at 108th Street.

The finishes at the five stations between 81st Street and 110th Street were 18 percent completed by May 1930. By that August, the BOT reported that the Eighth Avenue Line was nearly completed and that the five stations from 81st to 110th Street were 99 percent completed. The entire line was completed by September 1931, except for the installation of turnstiles. A preview event for the new subway was hosted on September 8, 1932, two days before the official opening. The 110th Street station opened on September 10, 1932, as part of the city-operated IND's initial segment, the Eighth Avenue Line between Chambers Street and 207th Street. Construction of the whole line cost $191.2 million (equivalent to $4,511.9 million in 2025). While the IRT Broadway–Seventh Avenue Line already provided parallel service, the new Eighth Avenue subway via Central Park West and Frederick Douglass Boulevard provided an alternative route.

Under the 2015–2019 Metropolitan Transportation Authority (MTA) Capital Plan, the station underwent a complete overhaul as part of the Enhanced Station Initiative and was entirely closed for several months. Updates included cellular service, Wi-Fi, USB charging stations, interactive service advisories and maps. A request for proposals for the 72nd Street, 86th Street, Cathedral Parkway–110th Street, and 163rd Street–Amsterdam Avenue stations was issued on June 1, 2017, and the New York City Transit and Bus Committee officially recommended that the MTA Board award the $111 million contract to ECCO III Enterprises in October 2017. As part of the renovations, the station was closed from April 9, 2018 to September 2, 2018. The southbound platform opened first, on September 2, followed by the northbound platform on September 4.

== Station layout ==
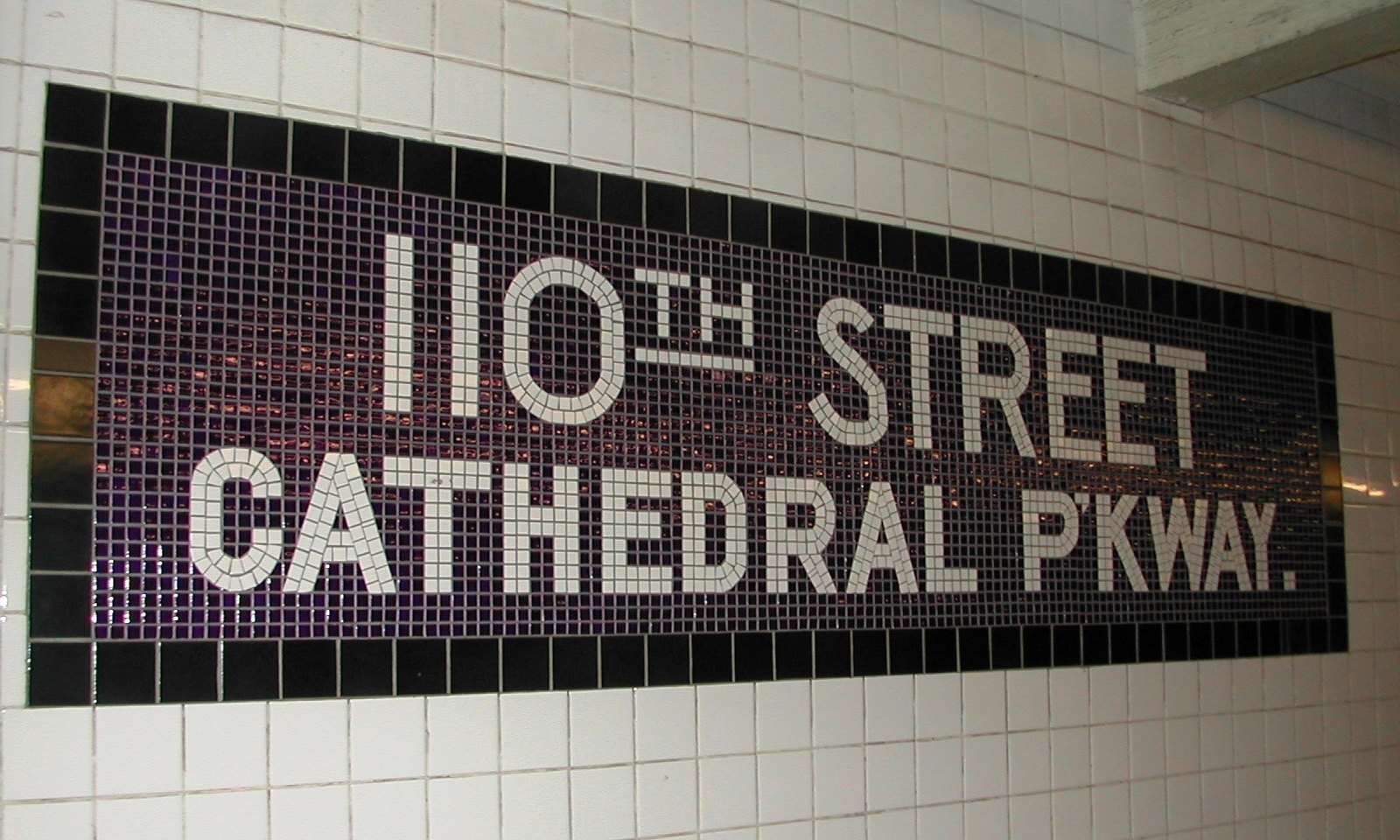
Mosaic name tablet

This underground station has four tracks and two side platforms.

The two center express tracks are used by the A train during daytime hours and the D train at all times.

The platforms have no trim line, but there are mosaic name tablets reading "110TH STREET CATHEDRAL P'KWAY." in white sans-serif lettering broken into two lines on a midnight blue background and black border. Grey (previously blue) I-beam columns run at regular intervals with alternating ones having the standard black station name plate in white lettering. Toward the southern end of the station, the northbound express track descends below the other three tracks of the Eighth Avenue Line.

At the south end of the station, two staircases from each platform go up to a mezzanine above the tracks that allows a free transfer between directions. There was a crossunder at the 110th Street exits, but it was closed in 1992.

The artwork at the station, installed in 1999, is called Migrations by Christopher Wynter in memory of Athie L. Wynter. It has three different areas of mosaic panels, two on each platform and one on the full-time mezzanine. As part of the 2018 renovation, this artwork was expanded.

=== Exits ===
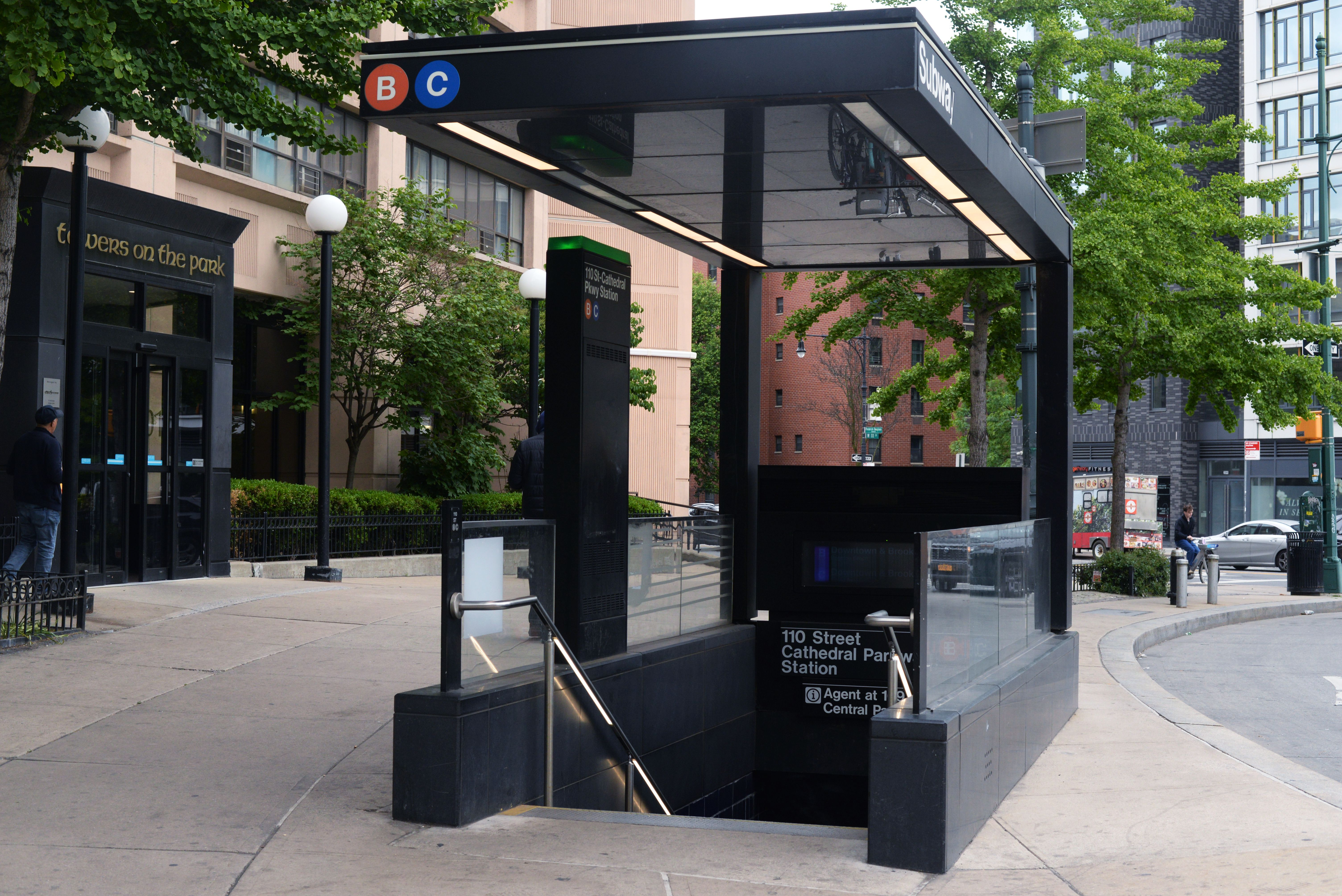
Southbound staircase at Frederick Douglass Circle

This station's full-time entrance/exit is at the south end, serving 109th Street. From the mezzanine above the tracks at the south end of the station, a turnstile bank provides entrance/exit from the system. Outside of fare control, there is a token booth and two staircases to the street. The southbound platform has an additional same-level entrance/exit at the north end, serving 110th Street. It has a part-time bank of four turnstiles and is unstaffed.

- One stair, NW corner of Frederick Douglass Circle at 110th Street and Central Park West (southbound only; part-time)
- One stair, SW corner of Central Park West and West 109th Street (both platforms; full-time)
- One stair, east side of Central Park West at West 109th Street, within Central Park (both platforms; full-time)

The northbound platform formerly had an entrance/exit to the northeast corner of Frederick Douglass Circle; this entrance corresponded to the open exit to the northwest corner of Frederick Douglass Circle on the southbound platform and is indicated by directional "110" signs without arrows below mosaics of the station name. Both platforms also had an entrance/exit at the north end to both northern corners of 111th Street and Frederick Douglass Boulevard; the northbound platform's entrance/exit led to the northeastern corner and the southbound platform's entrance/exit leading to the northwestern corner. All these exits have been sealed up with white tiling and used as employee-only spaces. The mezzanine had a second exit to the northwestern corner of 109th Street and Central Park West.

== Nearby points of interest ==
- Columbia University
- Morningside Park
- Cathedral of St. John the Divine
