= 110th Division (People's Republic of China) =

110th Division (1950–52)
- Active: 1950.2 - 1952.2
- Country: People's Republic of China
- Branch: People's Liberation Army
- Type: Division
- Role: Infantry
- Part of: 37th Corps
- Engagements: Chinese Civil War, Korean War

The 110th Division (Chinese: 第110师) was created in February 1950 under the Regulation of the Redesignations of All Organizations and Units of the Army, issued by Central Military Commission on November 1, 1948, basing on the 326th Division of Republic of China Army defected on September 19, 1949, during the Chinese Civil War.

The division was part of 37th Corps.

In April 1951 the division absorbed 4th Cavalry Division as preparation before entering Korea.

In September the division moved into Korea as a part of the People's Volunteer Army. During its deployment to Korea the division was in charge of rear guards mission and the construction of Namsi Airfield.

In December the division returned from Korea.

In February 1952 the division was inactivated and merged with 107th Division.
