= 110th Regiment of Foot (Queen's Royal Musqueteers) =

Infantry regiment of the British Army

The 110th Regiment of Foot (Queen's Royal Musqueteers) was an infantry regiment of the British Army from 1761 to 1763.

It was raised in 1761 by the regimentation of independent companies and named for Queen Charlotte, and was disbanded in 1763.
