= 110th Brigade =

In military terms, 110th Brigade or 110th Infantry Brigade may refer to:

== Bosnia ==
- 110th HVO Usora Brigade

== Germany ==
- 110th Panzer Brigade

== Iran ==
- 110th Salman Farsi Special Operations Brigade, a SOF Takavar unit of the Islamic Revolutionary Guard Corps Ground Forces

== Russia ==
- 110th Separate Guards Motor Rifle Brigade, a unit of the Russian Ground Forces

== Ukraine ==
- 110th Territorial Defense Brigade, a unit of the Ukrainian Territorial Defense Forces
- 110th Mechanized Brigade, a unit of the Ukrainian Ground Forces

== United Kingdom ==
- 110th Brigade (United Kingdom), a British Army formation during World War I
- 110th Brigade, Royal Field Artillery, a British Army formation during World War I

== United States ==
- 110th Aviation Brigade, United States Army
- 110th Maneuver Enhancement Brigade, Missouri Army National Guard

== See also ==
- 110th Division (disambiguation)
- 110th Regiment (disambiguation)
