= Inwood–207th Street station =

New York City Subway station in Manhattan

Inwood–207 Street
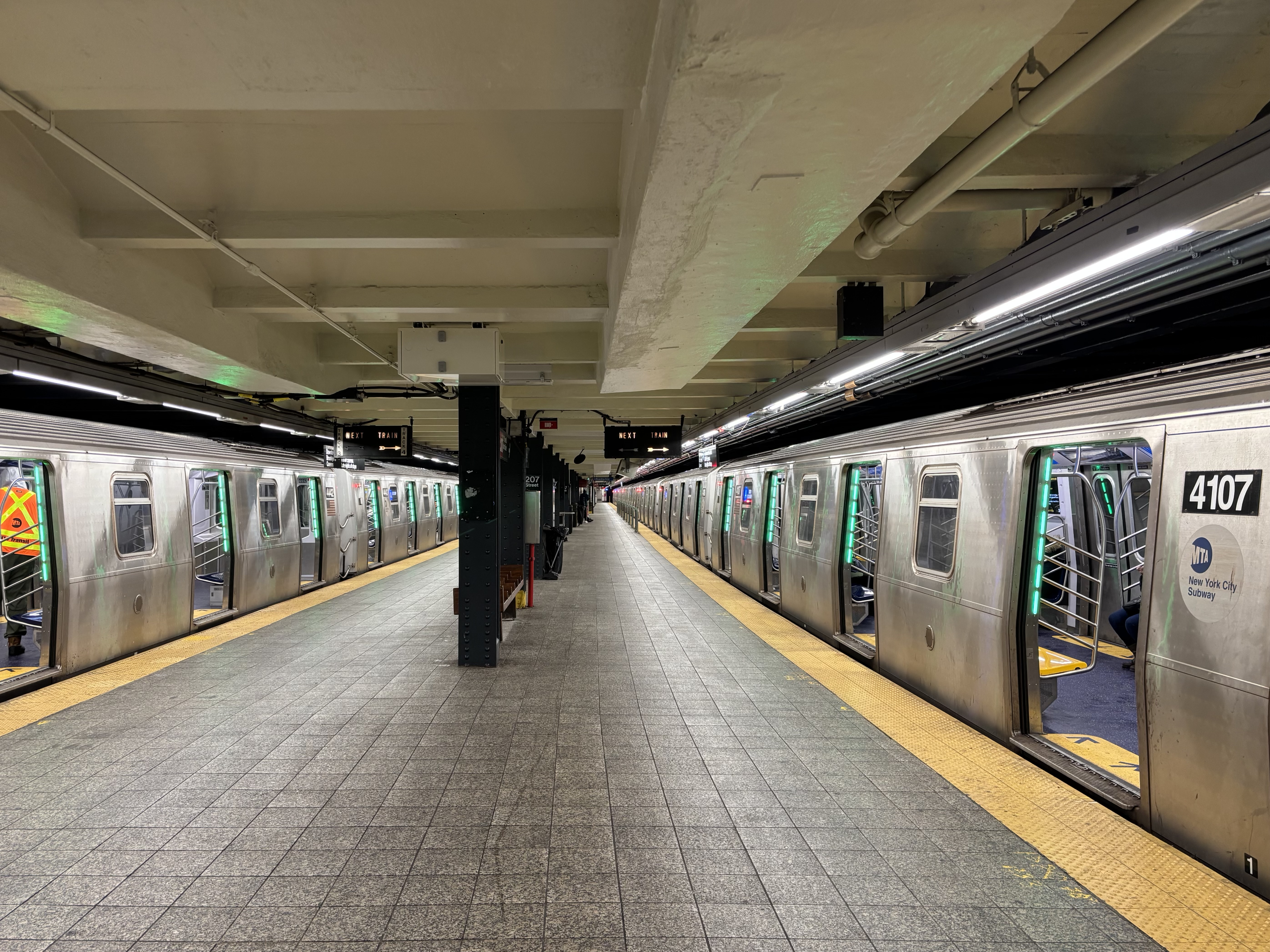
- R211A A trains stopped at the platform

Station statistics
- Address: West 207th Street and Broadway; New York, New York
- Borough: Manhattan
- Locale: Inwood
- Coordinates: 40.867672°N 73.921165°W
- Division: B (IND)
- Line: IND Eighth Avenue Line
- Services: A (all times)
- Transit: NYCT Bus: Bx7, Bx12, Bx12 SBS, Bx20; MTA Bus: BxM1
- Structure: Underground
- Platforms: 1 island platform
- Tracks: 2

Other information
- Opened: September 10, 1932; 94 years ago
- Accessible: Yes
- Former/other names: Washington Heights–207th Street
- Other entrances/ exits: Broadway and 207th Street, Broadway & 211th Street/Isham Street

Traffic
- 2025: 1,809,153 ▼0.6%
- Rank: 198 out of 423
Services
Preceding station	New York City Subway	Following station
Terminus	A (New York City Subway service)	Dyckman Street toward Far Rockaway–Mott Avenue or Ozone Park–Lefferts Boulevard
Location
Location within New York City Subway
Location within New York City
Location within New York
Track layout
Street map
Station service legend
Symbol	Description
Stops all times	Stops all times

The Inwood–207th Street station (formerly Washington Heights–207th Street) is the northern terminal station of the IND Eighth Avenue Line of the New York City Subway. Located at the intersection of 207th Street and Broadway in the Manhattan neighborhood of Inwood, near Inwood Hill Park, it is served by the A train at all times.

== History ==
New York City mayor John Francis Hylan's original plans for the Independent Subway System (IND), proposed in 1922, included building over 100 miles (160 km) of new lines and taking over nearly 100 miles (160 km) of existing lines. The lines were designed to compete with the existing underground, surface, and elevated lines operated by the Interborough Rapid Transit Company (IRT) and BMT. On December 9, 1924, the New York City Board of Transportation (BOT) gave preliminary approval for the construction of the IND Eighth Avenue Line. This line consisted of a corridor connecting Inwood, Manhattan, to Downtown Brooklyn, running largely under Eighth Avenue but also paralleling Greenwich Avenue and Sixth Avenue in Lower Manhattan. The BOT announced a list of stations on the new line in February 1928, with a station at 207th Street.

The finishes at the five stations between 175th and 207th Street were 18 percent completed by May 1930. By that August, the BOT reported that the Eighth Avenue Line was nearly completed and that the stations from 116th to 207th Street were 99.9 percent completed. The entire line was completed by September 1931, except for the installation of turnstiles. A preview event for the new subway was hosted on September 8, 1932, two days before the official opening. The 207th Street station opened on September 10, 1932, as part of the city-operated IND's initial segment, the Eighth Avenue Line between Chambers Street and 207th Street. It was originally known as Washington Heights–207th Street.

This station was renovated in the late 1990s, and the contract for the project's design was awarded in May 1994. In 1995, the MTA requested funds for the installation of elevators at the station to make it compliant with the Americans with Disabilities Act of 1990.

== Station layout ==
This underground station has a single island platform between the two tracks, which end at bumper blocks just north of the platform. The station is served by the A train at all times and is its northern terminus; the next station to the south is Dyckman Street. To the immediate south of the station is an interlocking made up of a diamond crossover that allows trains to get to the correct track, and then proceed to share the right of way with the 207th Street Yard leads towards the aforementioned Dyckman Street station. The mezzanine and street elevator shaft includes artwork titled At the Start...At Long Last by Sheila Levrant de Bretteville. The terminal is operated by a Dispatcher's Office at the south end, while the Interlocking Plant is controlled by the CTC located in the 207th Street Yard. The mezzanine connecting the north and south exits of the station is closed, and is used for employee facilities.

The station's tiles are colored maroon. This was part of a color-coded tile system used throughout the IND. The tile colors were designed to facilitate navigation for travelers going away from Lower Manhattan. As such, the maroon tiles used at the 207th Street station are also used at 168th Street, the first express station to the south, as well as at other stations on the Eighth Avenue Line north of 168th Street.

=== Exits ===
There are three street stairs and an elevator at the intersection of Broadway and 207th Street. The elevator is at the northeast corner of this intersection, making the station compliant with the Americans with Disabilities Act of 1990. One stair leads from each of the other three corners. The north exit to the station has two street stairs to either northern corner of Broadway, Isham Street, and 211th Street.

There is also a closed exit that led to the northwest corner of 207th Street and Broadway. This stair was located inside a building and had been closed after it was severely damaged after a fire. Several turns were required to access the staircase, creating poor sight-lines. In June 1994, the MTA Board approved a plan to permanently close the entrance, allowing the passageway to be sealed with brick-and-mortar at either end. At this point, the entrance had been closed for several years. It was estimated that the entrance would have been used by 400 daily passengers. A public meeting was held in May 1994, along with proposed station access changes at other stations. The elevator entrance is located near this old staircase.

== Nearby points of interest ==
- Inwood Hill Park
- Isham Park
