= Greenwich Avenue =

Avenue in Manhattan, New York

Coordinates: 40°44′13″N 74°0′5″W

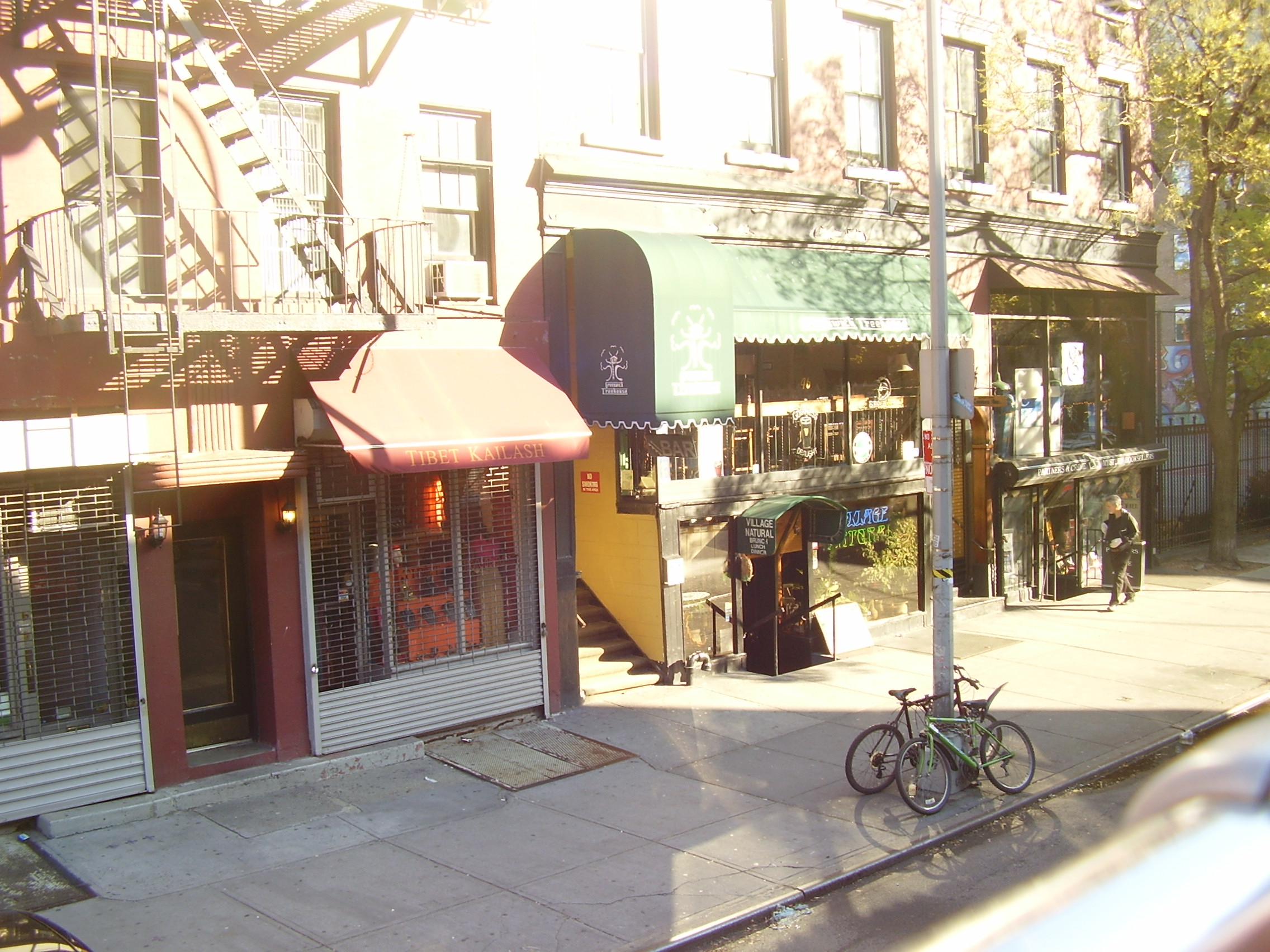
Shops on east side of Greenwich Avenue

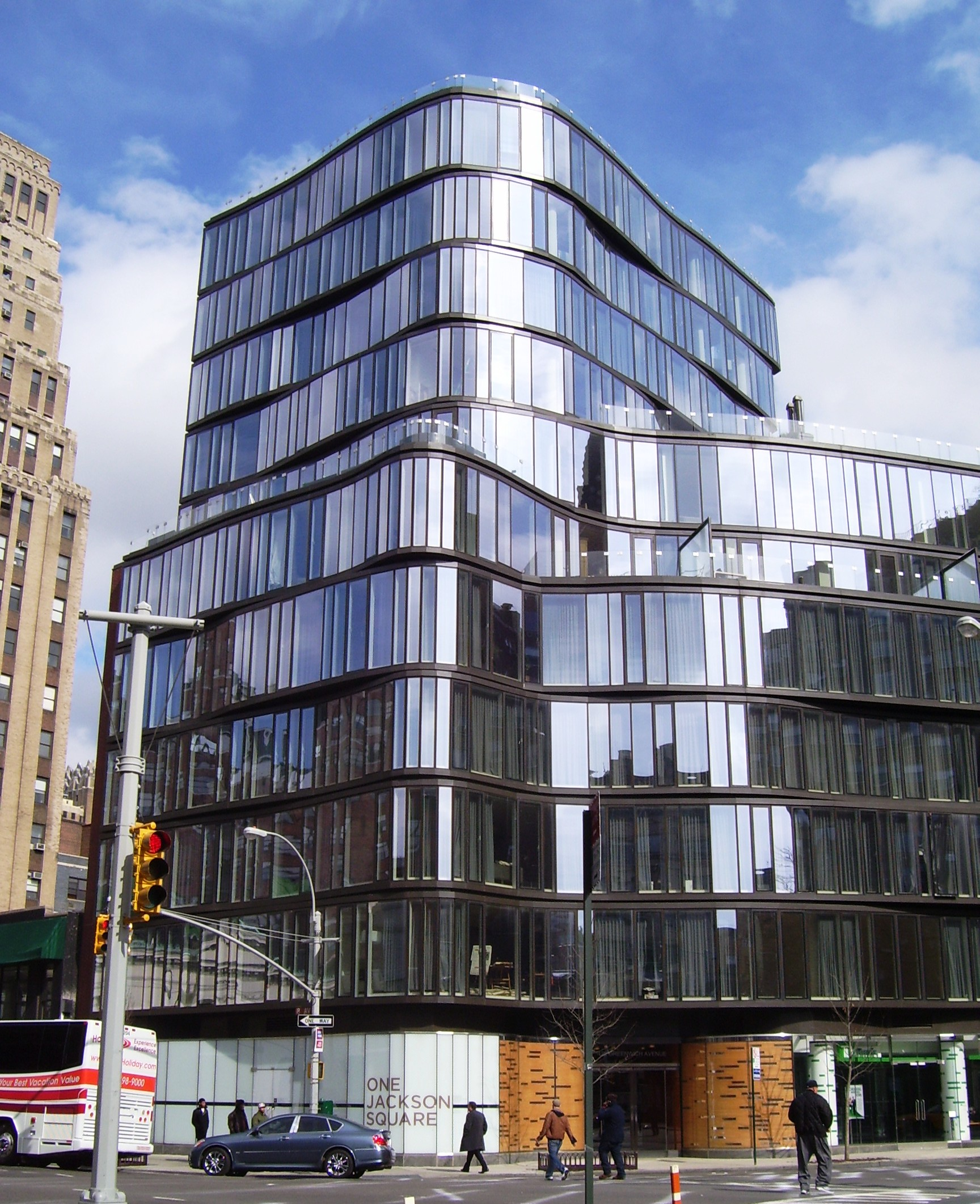
One Jackson Square at 122 Greenwich Avenue

Greenwich Avenue, formerly Greenwich Lane, is a southeast-northwest avenue located in the Greenwich Village neighborhood of Manhattan, New York City. It extends from the intersection of 6th Avenue and 8th Street at its southeast end to its northwestern end at 8th Avenue between 14th Street and 13th Street. It is sometimes confused with Greenwich Street. Construction of West Village Park, bounded by Greenwich Avenue, 7th Avenue, and 12th Street, began in 2016.

== Transportation ==
The A, B, C, D, E, F, <F>, and M subway trains stop on Sixth Avenue half a block south of Greenwich Avenue's southeastern end at the West Fourth Street – Washington Square station.

The 1, 2, and 3 subway trains stop on Seventh Avenue one block north of Greenwich Avenue at the 14th Street station.

The A, C, and E L subway trains stop on Eighth Avenue and 14th Street half a block north of Greenwich Avenue's northwestern end at the 14th Street – Eighth Avenue station, and the IND Eighth Avenue Line runs under Greenwich Avenue southeast from here to the next station stop at West Fourth Street – Washington Square station.

The Ninth Street PATH train station is located on Ninth Street just north of Greenwich Avenue at Sixth Avenue.

One bus route, the M8, runs on Greenwich Avenue south of West 10th Street when heading in the eastbound direction. Westbound buses cross it on Christopher Street.
