= 155th Brigade =

155th Brigade may refer to:

== British India ==
- 155th Indian Infantry Brigade

== Russia ==
- 155th Guards Naval Infantry Brigade

== Ukraine ==
- 155th Mechanized Brigade

== United Kingdom ==
- 155th (South Scottish) Brigade
- 155th (West Yorkshire) Brigade, Royal Field Artillery

== United States ==
- 155th Armored Brigade Combat Team

== See also ==
- 155th Division (disambiguation)
- 155th Regiment (disambiguation)
