= 155th =

155th is the ordinal form of the number 155. 155th or One hundred and fifty-fifth may also refer to:

- A fraction, 1/155, equal to one of 155 equal parts

== Geography ==
- 155th meridian east, a line of longitude
- 155th meridian west, a line of longitude
- 155th Street (disambiguation)

== Military ==
- 155th Brigade (disambiguation)
- 155th Division (disambiguation)
- 155th Regiment (disambiguation)

== See also ==
- June 4, 155th day of the year in a standard year
