= Gustavus Adolphus Smith =

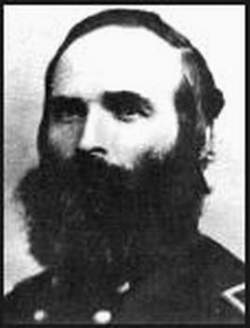
- Born: December 26, 1820; Philadelphia, Pennsylvania, US
- Died: December 11, 1885 (aged 64); Santa Fe, New Mexico, US
- Burial place: Santa Fe, New Mexico
- Military career
- Allegiance: United States of America
- Branch: Union Army
- Service years: 1861–1865
- Rank: Colonel; Brigadier General; Brevet Brigadier General
- Commands: 35th Illinois Infantry Regiment; 155th Illinois Infantry Regiment
- Conflicts: American Civil War: Battle of Pea Ridge

Gustavus Adolphus Smith (December 26, 1820 – December 11, 1885) was a prosperous carriage maker in Decatur, Illinois before the American Civil War. He was a volunteer Union Army colonel from the beginning of the war until September 22, 1863 and from February 28, 1865 until December 14, 1865. After the end of the war, on January 13, 1866, President Andrew Johnson nominated Smith for appointment to the grade of Brevet brigadier general of volunteers, to rank from March 13, 1865. The United States Senate confirmed the appointment on March 12, 1866. Starting in 1870, Smith was a collector of internal revenue in New Mexico.

At the outset of the American Civil War, Smith drilled recruits in Illinois and Missouri. He was appointed colonel of the 35th Illinois Infantry Regiment on September 1, 1861. At the Battle of Pea Ridge (Elkhorn Tavern), on March 7, 1862, he was severely wounded in the right shoulder and head. After Smith was authorized to raise a brigade of volunteers in July 1862, President Abraham Lincoln nominated Smith for, and temporarily appointed him to, the grade of brigadier general of volunteers in the Union Army, to rank from September 19, 1862. Because he was unfit for field service due to his wounds, the United States Senate did not confirm his appointment as brigadier general of volunteers and it expired on March 4, 1863. His actual highest substantive rank remained colonel.

Smith was dismissed from service in the Union Army on September 22, 1863. He was recalled on February 28, 1865 and appointed colonel of the 155th Illinois Infantry Regiment. That regiment guarded the Nashville and Chattanooga Railroad until the end of the war. Smith served as colonel of the 155th Illinois Infantry Regiment until he was mustered out of the service with the regiment on December 14, 1865.

In 1870, President Ulysses S. Grant appointed Smith to the office of collector of internal revenue for the District of New Mexico. Smith lived in Santa Fe, New Mexico until his death on December 11, 1885.

== Early life ==
Gustavus Adolphus Smith was born in Philadelphia, Pennsylvania on December 26, 1820. During his youth, he moved to Maryland and Ohio. In 1837, he settled at Decatur, Illinois, where he became a successful and prosperous carriage maker.

He married Margaret Ann Bane, who was born in County Kildare, Ireland on March 5, 1824. In 1851, Gustavus and Margaret Smith had a son, William A. Smith. Near the end of the American Civil War in 1865, William ran away from home at age 14 to join his father with the 155th Illinois Infantry Regiment. William A. Smith was later sheriff of McKinley County, New Mexico.

== American Civil War ==
After months of drilling recruits in Illinois and Missouri at the beginning of the American Civil War, Gustavus A. Smith was appointed colonel of the Union Army's 35th Illinois Infantry Regiment on September 1, 1861. The regiment was informally called "Gus Smith's Independent Regiment."

Smith was severely wounded in the right shoulder and had a skull fracture after his horse was shot from under him, his sword was struck by a bullet and shot from his hand and his belt and scabbard were shot off on March 7, 1862, early in the fighting on the first day at the Battle of Pea Ridge on Narrow Ridge near Telegraph Road and Elkhorn Tavern. According to Historian Ezra J. Warner Smith was directing the fire of the 1st Iowa Independent Battery Light Artillery when he was shot in the right shoulder and hit in the head by a shell fragment. Historians William L. Shea and Earl J. Hess described the movement of the 35th Illinois Infantry Regiment down Narrow Ridge to the right of division commander Eugene A. Carr's advanced position on Telegraph Road. The 35th Illinois Infantry came under fire from Confederate artillery and infantry directed at the 1st Iowa Artillery Battery. Smith's horse was killed from under him, his sword was shot from his hand and his belt and scabbard were shot away. While waiting for a new mount, he was shot in the right shoulder and struck in the head by a shell fragment. They do not mention whether Smith was also trying to direct the nearby guns of the 1st Iowa Artillery. At the time, Smith was bleeding profusely and thought to be mortally wounded. Although he recovered, his wounds did not fully heal until 1868.

Smith was assigned to recruiting duty after he had recovered enough from the Battle of Pea Ridge to perform limited service. He was authorized to raise a brigade of volunteers in July 1862. Smith then was nominated for, and temporarily appointed to, the grade of brigadier general of volunteers in the Union Army by President Abraham Lincoln to rank from September 19, 1862. Since Smith was unfit for field service due to his wounds suffered at Pea Ridge, the United States Senate did not confirm his appointment as brigadier general of volunteers. He reverted to his grade of colonel when the brigadier general appointed expired without confirmation on March 4, 1863. Thus, his actual highest substantive grade remained colonel.

Smith was dismissed from service in the Union Army on September 22, 1863. Historian Stewart Sifakis states that Smith was discharged for "fraudulent recruiting practices."

Smith was recalled to duty on February 28, 1865 to serve as colonel of the 155th Illinois Infantry Regiment. The regiment guarded the Nashville and Chattanooga Railroad until the end of the war. Smith served as colonel of the 155th Illinois Infantry Regiment until he was mustered out of the volunteer service with the regiment on December 14, 1865.

On January 13, 1866, President Andrew Johnson nominated Smith for appointment to the grade of brevet brigadier general of volunteers to rank from March 13, 1865 and the United States Senate confirmed the appointment on March 12, 1866.

== Later life and death ==
After living in Alabama temporarily after the war, the Smiths moved to Santa Fe, New Mexico in 1870 when President Grant appointed Smith to the office of collector of internal revenue for the District of New Mexico. Smith was a member of the Odd Fellows for more than 35 years. He served in executive and honorary posts with the society.

Gustavus Adolphus Smith died in Santa Fe, New Mexico on December 11, 1885. Warner states that Smith was buried in Fairview Cemetery (Santa Fe, New Mexico) and later reinterred at Santa Fe National Cemetery, while Eicher merely states that Smith was interred at Santa Fe National Cemetery.
