= 35th Illinois Infantry Regiment =

35th Regiment Illinois Volunteer Infantry
- Illinois state flag
- Active: July 3, 1861, to September 27, 1864
- Country: United States
- Allegiance: Union
- Branch: Infantry
- Engagements: Battle of Pea Ridge; Battle of Perryville; Battle of Stones River; Battle of Chickamauga; Battle of Missionary Ridge; Battle of Resaca; Battle of Pickett's Mill; Battle of Kennesaw Mountain; Siege of Atlanta; Battle of Peachtree Creek

The 35th Regiment Illinois Volunteer Infantry was an infantry regiment that served in the Union Army during the American Civil War.

== Service ==
The 35th Illinois Infantry was organized at Decatur, Illinois, and mustered into Federal service on July 3, 1861, for three years' service. Its organizer and first colonel was Gustavus A. Smith, after whom it was originally called G.A. Smith's Independent Regiment.

It initially served in Missouri, joining General Sigel's advance on Springfield in October. By early 1862, the regiment had marched over 500 miles through Missouri and Arkansas.

=== Battle of Pea Ridge and the Siege of Corinth ===
On March 7, 1862, as part of Dodge's Brigade, the 35th Illinois fought in the Battle of Pea Ridge at Elkhorn Tavern. The Regiment held its position against heavy odds until an overwhelming Confederate assault forced it to withdraw. Colonel Gustavus A. Smith was severely wounded in the action and never rejoined his regiment. Following the battle, the regiment marched through Arkansas and Missouri before being transported to Tennessee to participate in the Siege of Corinth.

=== Battle of Stones River ===
After months of guarding railroads and bridges, the regiment joined the Army of the Ohio for the pursuit of General Bragg through Kentucky. On December 30–31, 1862, the 35th Illinois fought in the Battle of Stones River, suffering 84 of their 439 engaged.

=== Battles of Chickamauga and Missionary Ridge ===
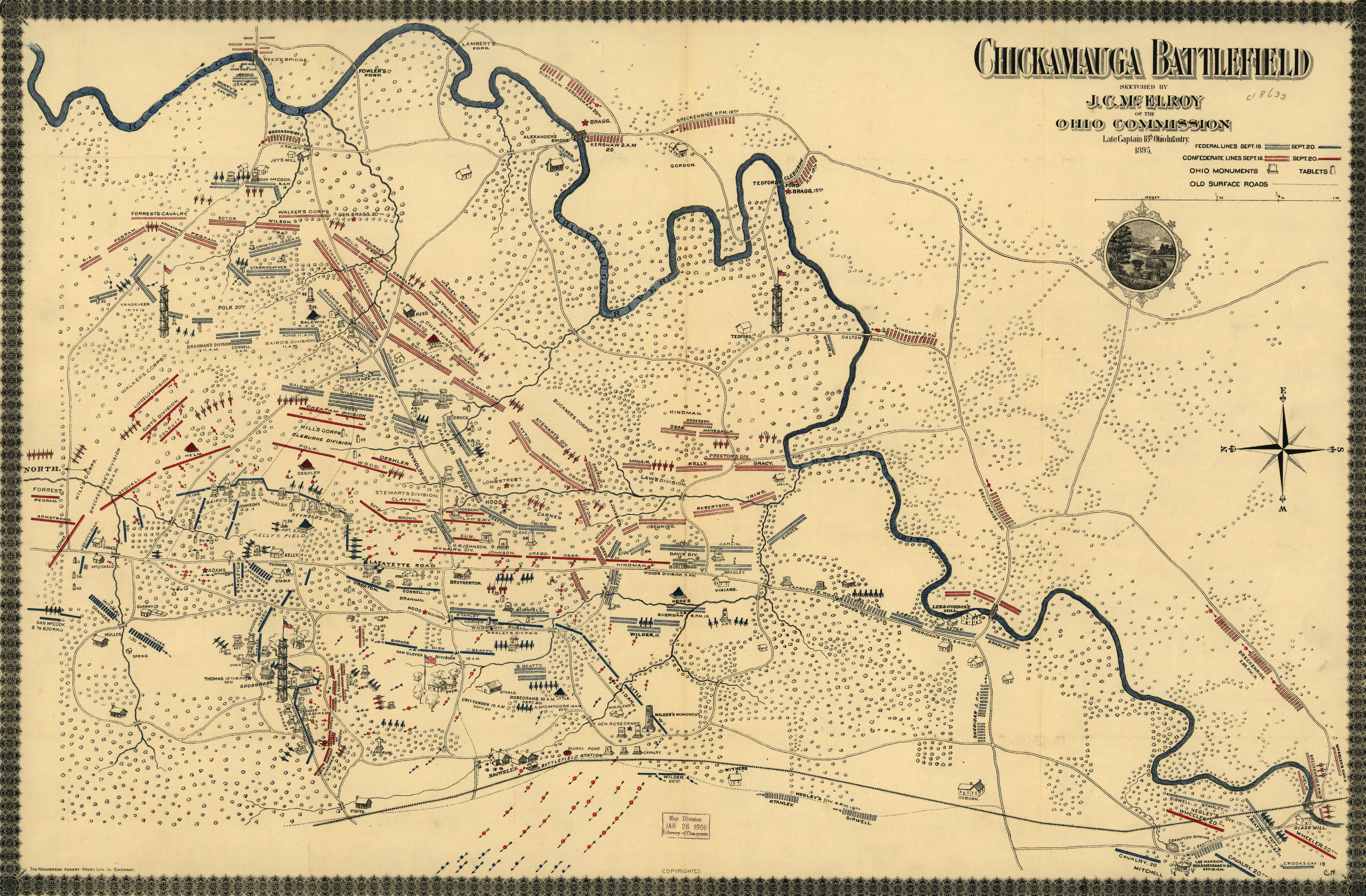
The Regiment suffered heavy casualties during the battle, losing 152 out of their 299 engaged.

In August 1863, the regiment's brigade was the first to cross the Tennessee River onto the South side. Then they took part in the Battle of Chickamauga, where they suffered heavy losses, losing 152 out of their 299 engaged.

During the Battle of Missionary Ridge, the regiment was in the frontline of the assault. After the regiment's entire color guard had been killed or wounded, Colonel William P. Chandler personally carried the regimental flag into the enemy works.

=== Atlanta Campaign ===
In 1864, the regiment participated in the Atlanta Campaign, seeing action at Rocky Faced Ridge, Resaca, and Dallas. On June 22, the regiment would take part in the Battle of Kennesaw Mountain, with one of their Majors, Major McIlwain, who was killed.

The Regiment Three-Year Enlistment period had expired during the Siege of Atlanta. In late August, they fought their way back to Chattanooga through Confederate cavalry raids, rebuilding railroad tracks as they went.

The regiment was mustered out on September 27, 1864, at Springfield, Illinois.

== Total strength and casualties ==
The regiment suffered 7 officers and 91 enlisted men who were killed in action or who died of their wounds, and 5 officers and 164 enlisted men who died of disease, for a total of 267 fatalities.

== Commanders ==
- Colonel Gustavus A. Smith - promoted to brigadier general on September 19, 1862.
- Colonel William P. Chandler - Mustered out with the regiment.

== See also ==
- List of Illinois Civil War Units
- Illinois in the American Civil War
