= 155th (West Yorkshire) Brigade, Royal Field Artillery =

- Royal Artillery cap badge
- Active: 1 February 1915–19
- Country: United Kingdom
- Branch: Kitchener's Army
- Role: Field Artillery
- Size: 4 Batteries
- Part of: 31st Divisional Artillery; 32nd Divisional Artillery; Army Troops
- Garrison/HQ: Leeds
- Patron: West Yorkshire Coal Owners' Association
- Engagements: Battle of the Somme; Battle of Arras; Battle of Messines; Third Battle of Ypres; German spring offensive Hundred Days Offensive

The 155th (West Yorkshire) Brigade, Royal Field Artillery, was a New Army ('Kitchener's Army') unit raised from Leeds in the West Riding of Yorkshire during the First World War. It saw service on the Western Front, including the Battles of the Somme, Arras, Messines and Passchendaele, the German spring offensive and the final Allied Hundred Days Offensive.

== Background ==
On 6 August 1914, less than 48 hours after Britain's declaration of war, Parliament sanctioned an increase of 500,000 men for the Regular British Army, and the newly appointed Secretary of State for War, Earl Kitchener of Khartoum issued his famous call to arms: 'Your King and Country Need You', urging the first 100,000 volunteers to come forward. This group of six divisions with supporting arms became known as Kitchener's First New Army, or 'K1'. The flood of volunteers overwhelmed the ability of the army to absorb and organise them, and by the time the Fifth New Army (K5) was authorised on 10 December 1914, many of the units were being organised as 'Pals battalions' under the auspices of mayors and corporations of towns up and down the country.

== Recruitment ==
The CLV (West Yorkshire) Brigade (155th Bde) Royal Field Artillery (RFA) was raised by the Leeds-based West Yorkshire Coal Owners' Association. It was therefore a 'Local Unit', raised under local initiative, not by the army mechanism like the early Kitchener 'New Armies', and therefore was comparable to the 'Pals Battalions' that formed the infantry of K5. Authority was given by the War Office (WO) on 1 February 1915, and the unit was officially taken over by the military authorities on 25 July 1915

The six K5 divisions were to be numbered 37th to 42nd, and CLV Bde was assigned to the 38th Division, composed of Pals battalions raised in the North of England, such as the Accrington Pals, the Sheffield City Battalion and a whole brigade of Hull Pals. All the division's RFA batteries and brigades were raised in Yorkshire towns. The WO then decided to convert the earlier K4 battalions into reserve units to train reinforcements for the K1–K3 units, and on 27 April 1915 the K5 divisions were renumbered to take up the vacant designations of the K4 formations. The short-lived 38th Division thus became 31st Division.

== Training ==
The New Army brigades of the RFA were organised into four 4-gun batteries, designated A, B, C and D, with a Brigade Ammunition Column (BAC). To start with, the men were billeted in their own homes and training was carried out locally, hampered by an almost total lack of equipment and instructors. Towards the end of May and early June 1915 the division began to assemble at South Camp, Ripon, where more serious training could begin. CLV Brigade was officially taken over by the military authorities from the recruiting committee on 25 July 1915, the rest of the divisional artillery on 1 September. In September the artillery moved to Fovant, where battle training was carried out on Salisbury Plain. The batteries were equipped with 18-pounder guns.

On 29 November the division was warned that it would embark for the Western Front on 6 December. Advance parties left for the embarkation ports, but on 2 December the orders were changed: the infantry would instead sail for Egypt with 32nd Division's artillery, leaving its own artillery behind.

== Western Front ==
=== Divisional Artillery ===
31st Divisional Artillery continued its training at Larkhill Camp for another month, and then went to France at the beginning of January 1916 to join 32nd Division. This was another Pals formation recruited largely in Birmingham, Salford and Glasgow. It had been in France since late November 1915, temporarily supported by the Divisional Artillery of 53rd (Welsh) Division of the Territorial Force (TF). The former 31st Divisional Artillery now became 32nd Divisional Artillery (32nd DA) for the rest of the war.

On 26 May 32nd DA was reorganised: D/CLV Battery left for CLXIV (Rotherham) Howitzer Brigade and was exchanged for A (H)/CLXIV Bty, which became D (H)/CLV. This battery was equipped with 4.5-inch howitzers. The brigade now consisted of 12 x 18-pdrs and 4 x 4.5s. At the same time the BACs were abolished and absorbed into the Divisional Ammunition Column (DAC).

==== Somme ====
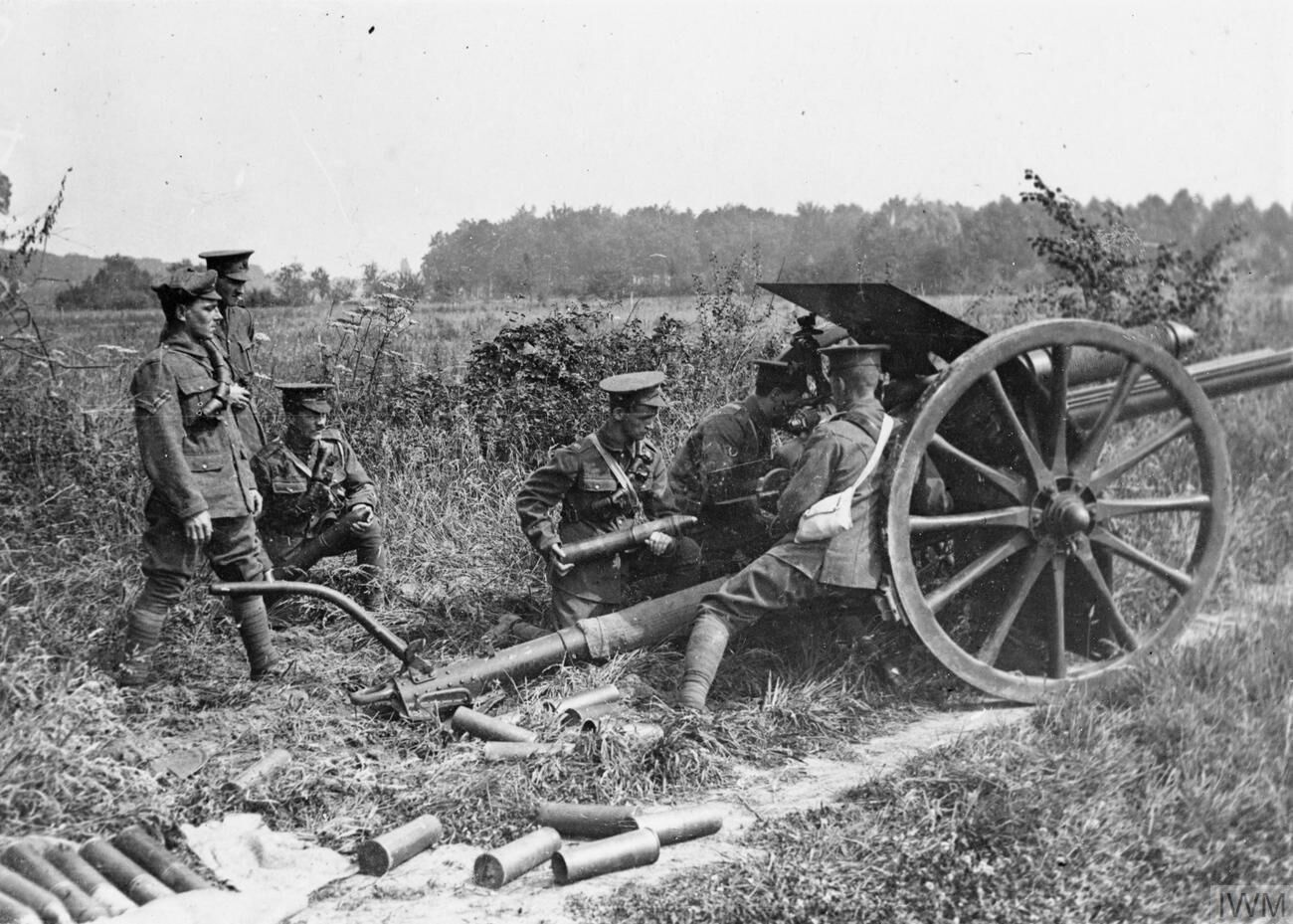
An 18-pounder in action on the Somme.

32nd Division was assigned to X Corps in the newly formed Fourth Army for the forthcoming 'Big Push' (the Battle of the Somme). 32nd Division was tasked with attacking out of the valley of the Ancre onto a spur of the Thiepval Plateau to capture the fortified village of Thiepval and the redoubt at the angle of the 'Leipzig Salient'. The division was then to go on to capture a series of strongpoints (including the Wundtwerke or 'Wonder Work') on the reverse slope of the spur.

Fourth Army planned five days (U, V, W, X and Y) of bombardment before Zero or Z Day, with the 18-pdrs assigned to cutting the barbed wire and 'searching' trenches, villages, woods and hollows, and the 4.5-inch howitzers to destroying communication trenches, machine gun positions, and assisting in bombardment of woods and villages. Both classes of gun were also to interrupt communications, particularly at night, and prevent the enemy from repairing damage to their defences. The wire-cutting began on 24 June (U Day). After three days the intensity of wire-cutting fire was increased to 4–500 shell per gun per day. Z day was put back by two days because of bad weather, but the bombardment was weaker on the extra days (Y1 and Y2) because of ammunition shortages. Reports on the effect of the wire-cutting varied: a night patrol from 97th Bde failed to get through the wire north of the Leipzig Redoubt and were shot down.

When the infantry went 'over the top' the field guns were to lay down a barrage in front of them. Some artillery commanders tried out a 'Creeping barrage', but in X Corps the 18-pdrs were simply ordered to 'lift' their barrage from one enemy trench to the next as the infantry advanced behind it, while the howitzers concentrated on selected strongpoints along the line of the barrage. Nevertheless, Brigadier J.B. Jardine, commanding 97th Brigade of 32nd Division, ordered his men to creep up to within 40 yards (37 m) of the barrage before attacking the German front line trenches.

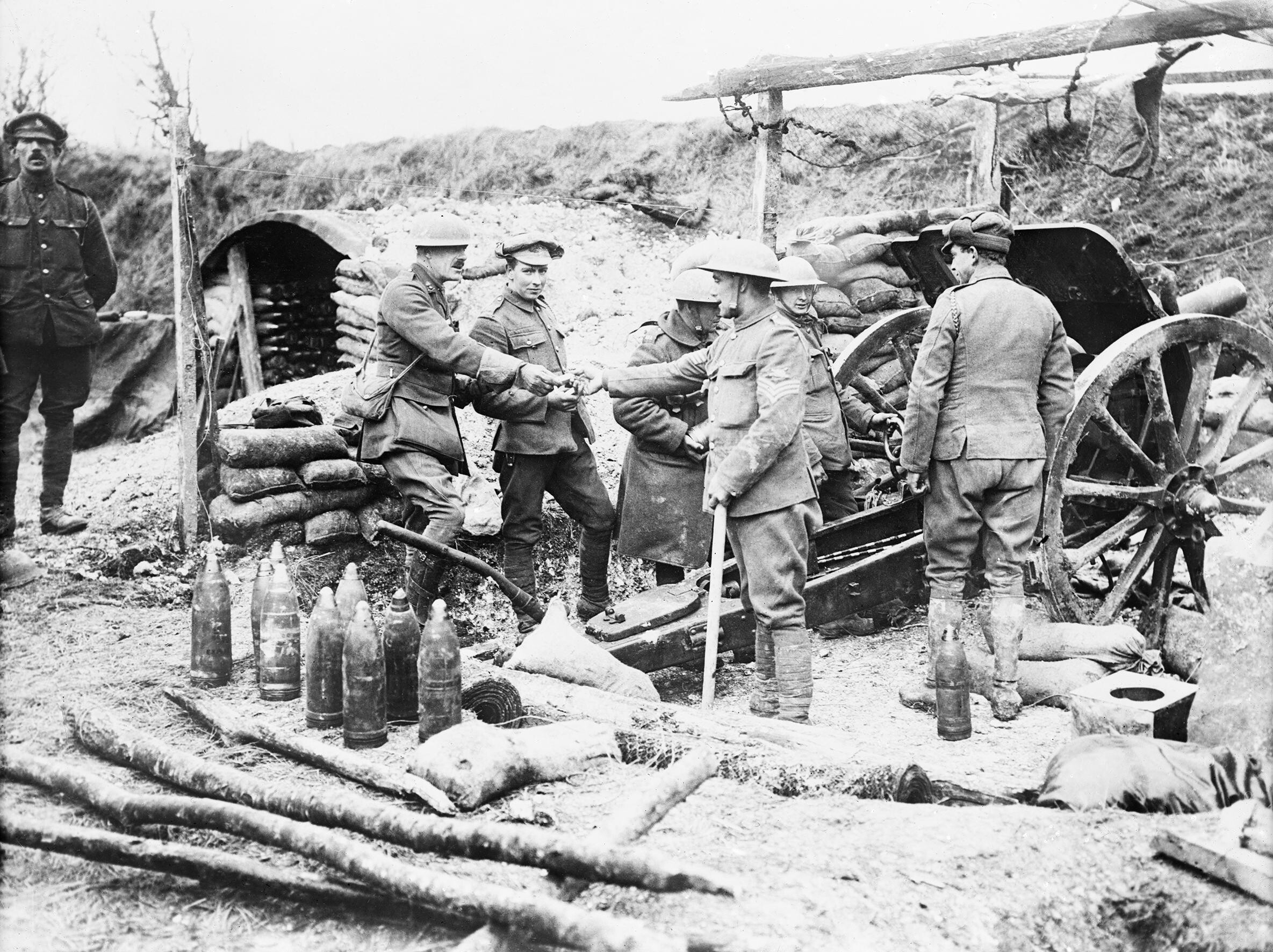
4.5-inch howitzer in action on the Somme.

When the attack went in at 07.30 on 1 July (the First day on the Somme), 97th Brigade had already crept out into No man's land. It found the wire adequately cut and keeping close to the barrage was able to overrun the Leipzig Redoubt, taking its defenders prisoner. However, 96th Brigade met with disaster, being cut down in No man's land by the machine guns in Thiepval and making no progress, the support companies being halted before going over. The first lift of the barrage was from the German front line to the reserve line (the Wonder Work etc), but the troops could not keep up and lost its benefits. The advancing 97th Brigade was shot down by machine guns in the Wonder Work and was obliged to withdraw to the Leipzig Redoubt. Strict orders for the barrage meant that it could not be brought back without higher authority, although Brigadier Jardine did take responsibility to order two batteries to come back to cover the withdrawal to the Leipzig Redoubt. After midday individual batteries fired at targets such as machine gun posts requested by the infantry, but there were few Forward Observation Officers (FOOs) with the infantry, and shellfire cut telephone lines, so fire control was poor. A new bombardment of the Wonder Work was arranged, but it was too diffuse to be effective. Erroneous reports that some of 32nd Division had got into Thiepval meant that the village was not fired on until the evening, and its defenders were able to mount counter-attacks against a break-through by the neighbouring 36th (Ulster) Division and to cause heavy casualties to the reserves coming up (49th (West Riding) Division). By the end of the day X Corps' only remaining gain was the Leipzig Redoubt. That night and for the next two days the gunners helped to evacuate the thousands of wounded infantrymen.

32nd Division was in action again at the Battle of Bazentin Ridge, on 14 July. This time the wire-cutting was more carefully controlled, with FOOs within 200 yards (180 m) of the German trenches to ensure accuracy. The attack went in before dawn, and the intense final bombardment of the enemy line before Zero was cut from 30 minutes to just 5 minutes to ensure surprise. The 18-pdrs and 4.5s firing the barrage used delayed-action fuses to avoid air-bursts in the trees above the troops forming up for the attack. 32nd Division made a subsidiary attack towards Ovillers. The bombardment was accurate and the infantry followed the barrage closely, so the opening of the attack was a great success, but it was not exploited. Afterwards the division was relieved and moved to the quieter Bethune area for the summer.

In mid-September CLV Bde was reorganised again: A Bty was split between B and C to give each six guns, and C Bty was redesignated A Bty. Then on 10 October the brigade was joined by 536 (2/1st Suffolk) Howitzer Bty, a 2nd Line TF unit equipped with four 4.5-inch howitzers that had just arrived in France and now became C (H)/CLV Bty. (Note: Originally this battery had been 2/1st Suffolk (H) Bty in 2/III East Anglian (H) Bde of 69th (2nd East Anglian) Division, later D (H)/CCCXLV Bty.)

After the BEF's successful advance at the Battle of Flers-Courcelette, the division was ordered back to the Somme sector, though the move did not begin until 16 October. 32nd Division was in reserve during the Battle of the Ancre Heights (23 October to 11 November). The Battle of the Ancre, delayed until 13 November by bad weather, was the final phase of the Somme Offensive. A mass of artillery was assembled, including 32nd Division's, to support an attack by V Corps. CLV Brigade was deployed around the position known as 'White City', where it suffered some casualties from counter-battery (CB) fire. Seven days of bombardment and wire-cutting preceded the attack. This time a full creeping barrage was employed, starting on the German front line with a quarter of the 18-pounders deliberately firing 50 yards short of the rest, into No man's land, to cover the advancing infantry. Then after six minutes the barrage began advancing at 100 yards (91 m) in 5 minutes. The barrage was to halt for an hour on the first objective, and then move on. The initial pre-dawn attack was a partial success, and attacks continued over succeeding days. 32nd Division's infantry came into the line on 17 November and attacked 'Munich Trench' the following day, though they were quickly stopped by machine gun fire. The battle ended on 18 November, with minor operations continuing through the winter. CLV Brigade was pulled out of White City to safer positions by 21 November, and the divisional artillery was relieved on 6 December. It moved to the St Ouen area, with CLV Bde billeted in nearby village of St Léger

=== CLV Army Field Artillery Brigade ===
CLV Brigade left 32nd Division with a section of the DAC as its BAC, and became an Army Field Artillery (AFA) brigade on 16 January 1917. As their title implies, AFA brigades were allocated by Army HQs to different formations as required. Before it left, the brigade underwent one more reorganisation: C (H) Bty (formerly 536 Bty) left to bring the howitzer batteries of CLXI (Yorkshire) and CLXVIII (Huddersfield) Bdes of 32nd Division up to six guns each. On 25 January, a section of 517 (H) Bty arrived from CLXIX Bde (31st Division) to make D (H)/CLV up to six howitzers. Finally, on 10 February, A/CCCVIII (2/IV South Midland) Bty arrived from 61st (2nd South Midland) Division to become C/CLV. The final composition of the brigade was as follows:

CLV Army Field Artillery Brigade

- A Bty (C Bty + half original A Bty) – 6 x 18-pounders
- B Bty (B Bty + half original A Bty) – 6 x 18-pounders
- C Bty (A/CCCVIII (South Midland) Bty) – 6 x 18-pounders
- D (H) (A (H)/CLXIV (Rotherham) Bty + half 517 (H) Bty) – 6 x 4.5-inch howitzers
- Brigade Ammunition Column

CLV Bde remained with V Corps while the operations on the Ancre continued in early 1917, first with 32nd Division to 19 January, then attached to 19th (Western) Division until 7 March, and then with 7th Division until 17 March, after which it went for rest.

==== Arras ====
On 28 March the brigade moved north to join Third Army, being attached to 30th Division with VII Corps for the Arras Offensive. This time there was greater subtlety in the artillery plan: the 18-pdrs in the creeping barrage fired 50 per cent High Explosive (HE) shells, which provided greater protection for the advancing infantry and required less complex calculations than Shrapnel shell. A 'standing barrage' came down on the enemy trench line until the creeping barrage reached it, when the standing barrage lifted to the next trench. On 30th Division's front the barrage 'crept' at a rate of 100 yards (91 m) in three minutes, slowing to 100 yds in six minutes for the advance onto the final objective. The 4.5s were given a series of targets to engage with gas shells. Some field artillery batteries were ready to move out into No man's land to engage more distant targets as the infantry attacked. They also had to carry out additional wire-cutting before the attack, which the heavy guns had not completed. The assault on 9 April (the First Battle of the Scarpe) was generally successful, but on 30th Division's front the wire was still uncut and the attack was a costly failure. The follow-up attacks on 10 April were also unsuccessful, as the guns had to struggle forward through mud and fire-plans were hurried. 30th Division's infantry faced the most difficult sector of the Hindenburg Line, and without strong artillery support could make no progress on 11 April.

The Arras Offensive bogged down but fighting continued into May, with CLV Bde supporting 37th Division from 16 April, then moving to VII Corps, supporting 29th Division (19–26 April) for the Second Battle of the Scarpe, 3rd Division (26 April to 6 May) for the Third Battle of the Scarpe, and then 56th (1/1st London) Division from 6 May. On 11 May this division carried out a small attack on 'Tool Trench'. The previous day a practice barrage had drawn heavy retaliatory fire, so it was decided to dispense with the field artillery barrage and carry out a surprise attack instead. The weary troops were then sent for rest, CLV Bde leaving on 17 May.

==== Messines ====
CLV brigade went back into the line on 25 May with 19th (W) Division in IX Corps of Second Army for the Battle of Messines. It was part of a huge artillery reinforcement for this carefully-planned attack, the preliminary bombardment for which had already begun on 21 May. Eight days of intensive bombardment commenced on 31 May, including two practice barrages. The fortified Wytschaete village in front of IX Corps was given a special gas shell bombardment by the 4.5s. At Zero (03.10) on 7 June the assault began with the explosion of 19 huge mines under the German front line. Two-thirds of the 18-pdrs fired a creeping barrage ahead of the assaulting infantry, pausing at each objective, while the rest of the 18-pdrs and the 4.5s fired a standing barrage 700 yards (640 m) further ahead. There was virtually no opposition in the devastated German front line and the infantry swept into Wytschaete with ease. While the infantry consolidated their gains, the field batteries moved forwards into No man's land to fire a new barrage which was closely followed by the supporting brigades onto the second objective. Overall the day's action was a great success, though too often the artillery opened fire on groups of returning friendly troops, mistaking them for German counter-attacks, and the 18-pdrs hastily emplaced in No Man's land often fired short into IX Corps' troops.

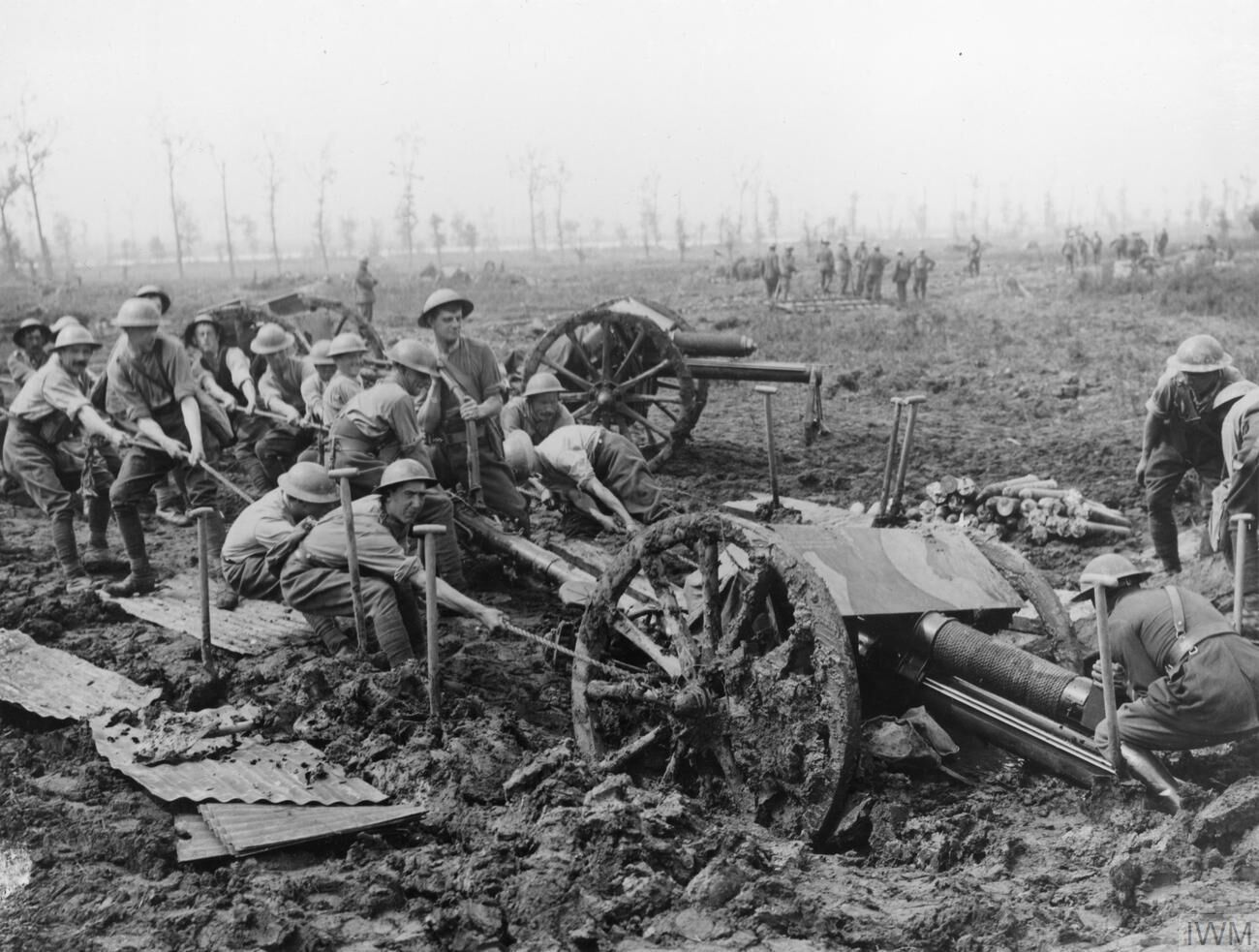
18-pounder being hauled out of mud near Ypres, August 1917

==== Ypres ====
Immediately after Messines, CLV Bde was transferred to Fifth Army, first with 30th Division in II Corps (12–22 June), then with 39th Division in XVIII Corps, which had arrived to prepare for the opening of the Third Ypres Offensive. The British artillery had fewer advantages here: the Ypres Salient was cramped and overlooked from Pilckem Ridge in front, and the massed batteries suffered badly from German CB fire during the 18-day preparatory bombardment. When the infantry attacked on 31 July (the Battle of Pilckem Ridge) the field guns fired the usual creeping and standing barrages on a greater scale than ever before. On XVIII Corps' front the infantry managed to get across the ridge and down to the Steenbeke stream beyond, while the artillery broke up a serious German counter-attack in the early afternoon. Some of the field batteries moved forward to join others that had remained silent and hidden close to the start-line. But it began to rain, and soon proved almost impossible for the exhausted gunners to get their guns forward through the devastation and mud, and further progress was halted that evening.

On 5 August CLV Bde was attached to the fresh 48th (South Midland) Division, which had relieved 39th Division. Resumption of the offensive had been held up by rain, but on 16 August a fresh attack was made on XVIII Corps' front as part of the Battle of Langemarck. Artillery support was good, and the corps captured some ground, though 48th (SM) Division was held up by a group of fortified farms, and the attack was disastrous in other areas.

On 20 August 48th (SM) Division took advantage of a spell of dry weather to attack the troublesome strongpoints that had held them up: Hillock Farm, Maison du Hibou, Triangle Farm and the Cockcroft. Seven tanks moved up the firm St Julien–Poelcapelle road covered by a smoke and shrapnel barrage, with an HE barrage ahead, and subdued the strongpoints that were then captured by infantry platoons. A repeat of this attack two days later was less successful.

CLV brigade stayed in the line with XVIII Corps during the next comparative lull in the fighting, first with 23rd Division (28 August to 4 September) and then with the fresh 58th (2/1st London) Division which was brought in to relieve 48th (SM) Division before the next attack, the Battle of the Menin Road Ridge on 20 September. There were significant casualties among the massed field batteries from CB fire in the days preceding the attack. Practice barrages were fired, and numerous trench raids were supported by the guns, with 58th (2/1st L) Division raiding and patrolling aggressively to locate enemy pillboxes and strongpoints and to advance by 'nibbling' away at the German defences. Field gun barrages were fired at night to isolate German gun positions to prevent them resupplying. On the day of the attack the creeping barrage consisted of five belts of fire, the rearmost ('A', nearest the attacking infantry) being fired by half the 18-pdrs, of which one-third of the batteries were 'superimposed' so that they could be redirected to fire at targets of opportunity without leaving a gap in the barrage. The 'B' barrage line 200 yards (180 m) ahead was provided by the 4.5s and the rest of the 18-pdrs. It was impressed on the infantry that they were to follow the barrage closely, and the attack was a great success, 58th (2/1st L) Division carrying out a well-rehearsed operation to take Wurst Farm Ridge. German counter-attacks were crushed by the artillery.

58th (2/1st L) Division was engaged on the periphery of the next major attack, the Battle of Polygon Wood on 26 September. CLV brigade was then rested from 27 September to 16 October, missing several more attacks through the autumn, before returning to XVIII Corps, first with 9th (Scottish) Division then, from 23 October, with 63rd (Royal Naval) Division for the Second Battle of Passchendaele (26 October). The infantry was held up by knee-deep mud and the troops fell behind the barrage. On XVIII Corps' front the attack was a complete failure, as was another on 30 October.

On 2 November, II Corps took over this section of the front, including 63rd (RN) Division and CLV Bde, as a few minor gains were made. The brigade came under the fresh 1st Division on 5 November, which provided flank cover for the final attack of the Battle of Passchendaele on 10 November.

CLV brigade was sent for much-needed rest (Note: The regimental historian comments on the extreme exhaustion of the gunners by the end of the Ypres offensive.) on 22 November, but on 3 December it was sent to reinforce III Corps in Third Army, which was at the end of desperate fighting against German counter-attacks at Cambrai. It was assigned to the embattled 6th Division, then after the fighting died down it transferred to 19th (W) Division on 13 December.

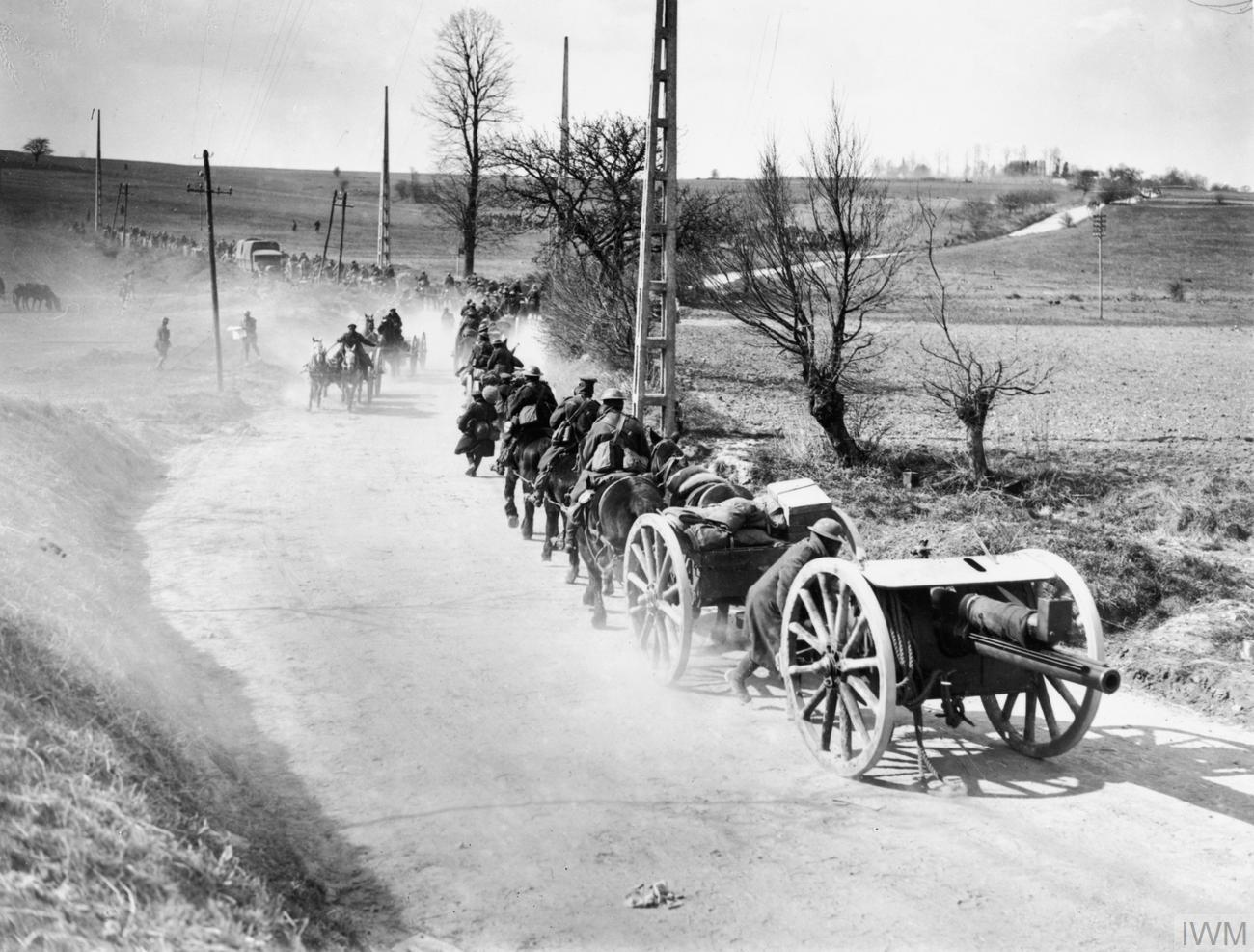
18-pounder battery moving up to meet the German Spring Offensive.

==== Spring Offensive ====
During the winter of 1917–18, V Corps took over both 19th (W) Division and CLV Bde (15 December), which then transferred to 47th (1/2nd London) Division (7 January). On 14 January CLV Bde moved north to First Army, where it was allowed to rest for a month. From 19 February to 9 March its gunners were engaged in preparing positions with 31st and 56th (1/1st L) Divisions, then it went into GHQ Reserve.

The German spring offensive opened on 21 March 1918 with Operation Michael and made massive gains. That afternoon CLV Bde was sent from GHQ Reserve to reinforce Third Army. It joined Guards Division reinforcing VI Corps on 23 March. The Guards took up positions in the 'Third System' of reserve trenches near Mercatel. On 25 March there was considerable German movement in front of the Guards Division, but any attempt to advance was broken up by the British artillery. However, with its flank 'in the air' VI Corps was forced to join in the general retirement during the night, pivoting on the Guards' positions. Next day the advancing German infantry and artillery presented 'splendid targets' according to the Guards' commander, and CLV Bde was in action near Hendecourt from the morning onwards. Over the next three days repeated German attacks 'withered away' in the face of rifle and shellfire, as the Guards held the pivot point around Boisleux-au-Mont and Boisleux-Saint-Marc. On 28 March the Germans renewed their efforts against this northern hinge of the British line around Arras. However, the German CB fire was inadequate and the British guns contributed to halting the German attack. A further attempt on 30 March was met by all batteries on the Guards' front firing on the 'SOS' lines with occasional 'rakes' of enemy-occupied villages: the attackers offered 'fine targets' for the guns. At the end of the day the Guards still held their positions. With this failure the German attacks on this sector had ended by 31 March.

CLV Brigade remained with the Guards until the division was relieved in the line, then on 16 April it joined 40th Division. This division had been badly hit during the Spring Offensive and was out of the line in the St Omer area. CLV Brigade was in Corps Reserve from 30 April to 12 May, then returned to 40th Division, but that formation was in the process of being broken up, only the HQs remaining to form training cadres.

The brigade was now posted to its original parent formation, 32nd Division, on 18 May. The division was in the now-quiet sector south-west of Arras, but the gun lines suffered badly from gas shelling. The chaplain of 32nd DA commented that CLV's lines were 'all over the place' and difficult to find. CLV Brigade went into GHQ Reserve on 31 May but was back with 32nd DA from 18 June to 7 July, around Berles-au-Bois. The sector was quiet but there was a steady trickle of casualties from shells and bombs.

==== Hundred Days Offensive ====
The Guards Divisional Artillery came back into their old positions in the Boisleux sector on 7 July, where CLV Bde rejoined them. Planning for the Allied counter-offensive was now under way, and some of the batteries were moved into forward positions during August. The Hundred Days Offensive opened on 8 August with the Battle of Amiens. Third Army joined in at the Third Battle of Albert, with Guards Division attacking towards Moyenneville supported by seven RFA brigades. There was no creeping barrage, but three overlapping standing barrages: the first between the start line and the first objective, the second on the first objective, and the third on a line through Courcelles-au-Bois. One 18-pdr battery in each brigade fired smoke shell, and special targets were allocated to the howitzer batteries. Zero was at 04.35 on 21 August, and the attack began in thick mist, which hindered the FOOs and observation aircraft. However, opposition was light and when the mist cleared the division took Moyenneville and moved up to the Arras–Albert railway line, its third and final objective. That night and next day the infantry pushed forward to establish a start-line for a new attack on 23 August and the guns were brought forward while some batteries harassed the enemy and broke up counter-attacks. The attack at 04.00, preceded by a creeping barrage, was a major success, gaining the Mory switch trench by the evening. The advance was continued over the next two days, CLV Bde up in close support of the attacking brigade on 24 August while the rest of the artillery fired the barrage. But at Saint-Léger resistance began to harden, with machine gun fire from an old trench ('Banks Trench') and retaliatory fire on the field batteries, which were kept busy repelling counter-attacks. The Guards paused on 26 August, then attacked again next day (the Battle of the Scarpe) behind a barrage creeping at 100 yards (91 m) in 2 minutes. Fighting was hard, and by the end of the day a portion of Banks Trench still held out in the midst of the division's final positions. At 19.00, therefore, the artillery concentrated its fire on this point for 15 minutes, after which 150 Germans surrendered. Steady progress continued on 28 August, after which the Guards were relieved by 3rd Division that night.

There was no relief for either CLV Bde or the Guards' artillery, which continued in action under 3rd Division, with the horses suffering from shortage of water as well as shellfire. The guns covered 3rd Division's infantry as they captured Écoust-Saint-Mein, Longatte and Lagnicourt-Marcel over 29–31 August. First and Third Armies then attacked in a set-piece action (the Battle of the Drocourt-Quéant Switch Line) on 2 September. 8th Brigade led 3rd Division's advance, its three battalions in line supported by the fire of no less than seven brigades of field artillery (including CLV) and two of heavies. The barrage was excellent and at first good progress was made, but the supporting tanks got bogged down, and so did the divisional attack. However, with the 'D–Q' Line broken, the Germans began a withdrawal that night to the line of the Canal du Nord. CLV Brigade reverted to the Guards Division, which passed through 3rd Division on 3 September and attacked behind a creeping barrage, but finding no enemy in front was able to make a 6 miles (9.7 km) advance.

Although enemy resistance stiffened in front of the Canal du Nord, Guards Division kept up the pressure with artillery support as it eliminated the covering positions and closed up to reconnoitre the canal on 4–5 September. During the subsequent pause CLV Bde got a short rest, 6–9 September, then it joined 2nd Division on 10 September for the Battle of Havrincourt. The division made a preliminary advance behind a barrage towards Havrincourt on 11 September and seized the far bank of the canal near the 'Spoil Heap' where it was dry. The rest of Third Army then followed up on 12 September.

For the Battle of Épehy on 18 September 1918 CLV Bde was switched to V Corps. Together with 17th (Northern) Divisional Artillery and a heavy brigade it supported 38th (Welsh) Division. The artillery programme included a creeping barrage by 18-pdrs, a 'searching' barrage by 18-pdrs and 4.5s, and a half-hour smoke barrage from zero hour (05.20) by 4.5s ('a sight to gladden the eye of any professional Gunner', according to the RA historian). One brigade of 38th (W) Division easily reached its second and final objective, but the other had more trouble: a renewed barrage from 14.50 to 15.20 allowed it to take its first objective by nightfall.

The brigade was next moved to the Canadian Corps in First Army on 20 September, supporting 11th (Northern) Division for the set-piece Battle of the Canal du Nord on 27 September. The Canadians had been held up on their left, but as 11th (N) Division came into the line alongside them, the whole line advanced to the high ground beyond the canal, even though they had been left behind by their barrage. The barrage for the second phase was delayed while 11th (N) Division mopped up some enemy machine guns, then it was launched forward again at 15.00, the AFA brigades having crossed the canal to provide this barrage. By the end of the day the division had advanced well beyond its set objectives, and next day the Germans in front of them retired behind the Sensée Canal. As the Canadians pushed forwards, 11th (N) Division provided a flank guard. CLV Brigade was transferred to 2nd Canadian Division on 7 October for its assault crossing of the Schelde Canal at 01.30 on 9 October. This attack was supported by eight field brigades firing 'crash' and standing barrages: the enemy had already withdrawn between the Schelde and Sensée canals.

The brigade was with 56th (1/1st L) Division from 11 October when it joined the Canadian Corps. On the night of 12/13 October, one of the division's brigades carried out a silent crossing of the Sensée Canal at Aubigny-au-Bac. When the Germans became aware of what had happened they began counter-attacks, which were broken up by the covering artillery. But the fighting to maintain the precarious bridgehead went on for several days until 56th (1/1st L) Division handed over to 4th Canadian Division. CLV Brigade remained in the line supporting the Canadians as they crossed the canal and continued the pursuit, until 20 October, when it was rested for a week.

On 28 October CLV Bde went back to Third Army, being attached to IV Corps, to support the right wing (37th Division) as it advanced towards the River Sambre. 5th Division passed through 37th Division to continue the advance on 3 November. The corps was supported by 12 field brigades, together with heavy artillery, but it had to struggle through the Forêt de Mormal where the scanty roads had been destroyed, and it proved difficult to get any of these guns up. On 9 November CLV Bde joined 42nd (East Lancashire) Division on IV Corps' left. This division had worked its way up to the Sambre, improvised crossings, and then closed in on the town of Hautmont and nearby Fort Hautmont. The river was bridged by the evening, allowing artillery and ammunition to follow up as 42nd (EL) Division's patrols pushed forward against weakening resistance on 10 November. Next day the Armistice with Germany came into force.

CLV (West Yorkshire) Army Field Artillery Brigade was disbanded in 1919.
