= 168th Street station (New York City Subway) =

New York City Subway station in Manhattan

168 Street
- New York City Subway station complex
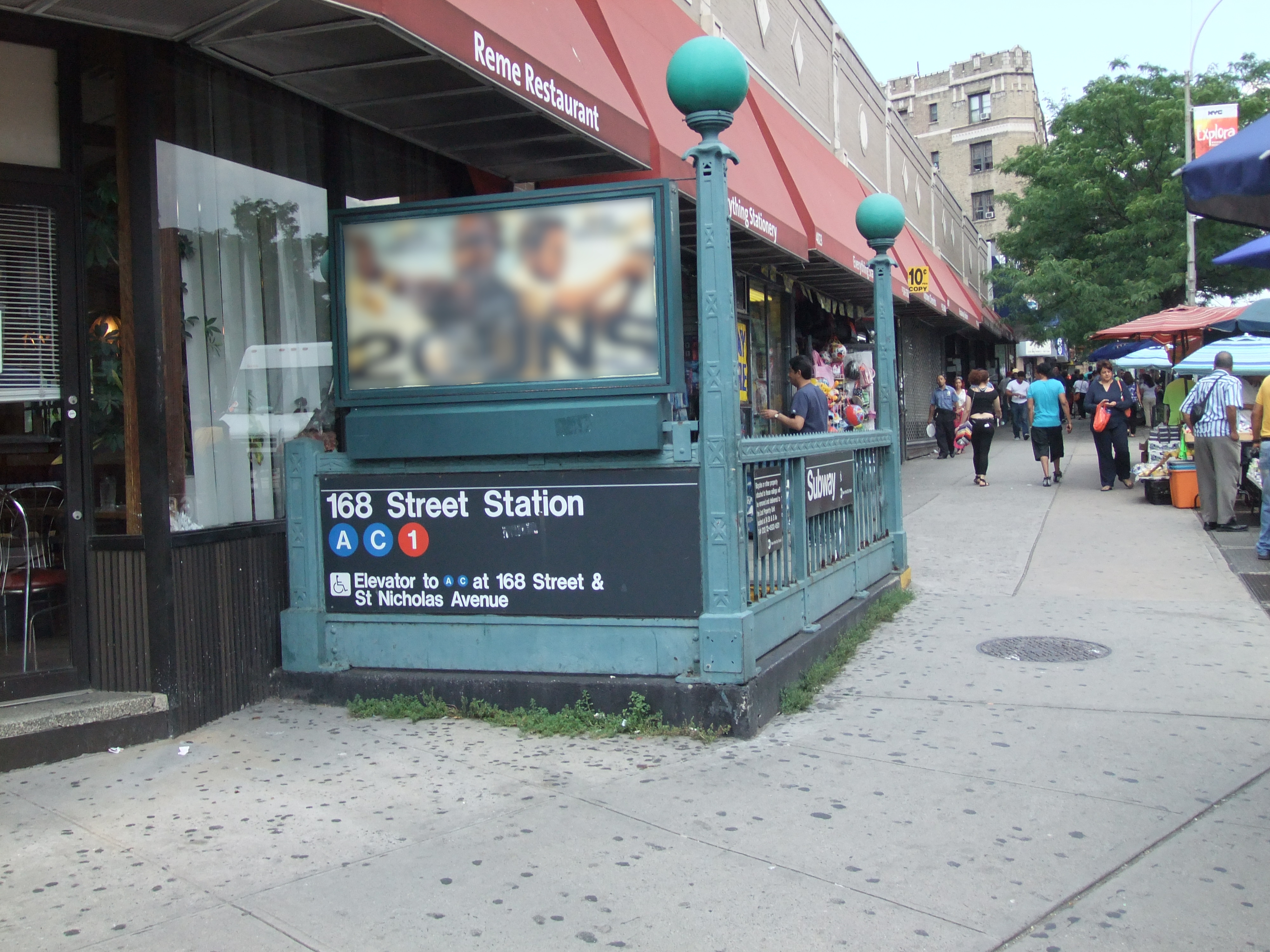
- Entrance at 169th Street

Station statistics
- Address: West 168th Street, Broadway, and St. Nicholas Avenue; New York, New York
- Borough: Manhattan
- Locale: Washington Heights
- Coordinates: 40.841022°N 73.939791°W
- Division: A (IRT), B (IND)
- Line: IND Eighth Avenue Line; IRT Broadway–Seventh Avenue Line
- Services: 1 (all times); A (all times); C (all except late nights)
- Transit: NYCT Bus: Bx7, M2, M3, (M4 on Fort Washington Avenue), M5, M100; Short Line Bus: 208-GWB Eastside Commuter Intercampus Shuttles, Fort Lee Shuttle, Lamont Shuttle
- Levels: 2

Other information
- Opened: For the transfer point, July 1, 1948 (78 years ago)
- Accessible: Partially; full access planned (IND Eighth Avenue Line platforms only)
- Former/other names: Washington Heights–168th Street

Traffic
- 2025: 5,339,804 ▲1.3%
- Rank: 55 out of 423
Location
Location within New York City Subway
Location within New York City
Location within New York
Street map
Station service legend
Symbol	Description
Stops all times except late nights	Stops all times except late nights
Stops all times	Stops all times

The 168th Street station (formerly the Washington Heights–168th Street station) is an underground New York City Subway station complex shared by the IRT Broadway–Seventh Avenue Line and IND Eighth Avenue Line. It is located at the intersection of 168th Street and Broadway in the Washington Heights neighborhood of Manhattan and served by the 1 and A trains at all times, and the C train at all times except late nights. It is the northern terminus for all C trains.

The Broadway–Seventh Avenue Line station was built for the Interborough Rapid Transit Company (IRT), and was a station on the West Side Branch of the city's first subway line, which was approved in 1900. The station opened on April 14, 1906. The Eighth Avenue Line station was built as an express and terminal station for the Independent Subway System (IND) and opened on September 10, 1932, as part of the IND's first segment.

The IRT station has two side platforms and two tracks. The IND station has two island platforms and four tracks, although the track configuration is reversed from most New York City Subway express stations, with express trains using the outer tracks and local trains using the inner tracks. The transfer between the IRT platforms and the IND platforms has been within fare control since July 1, 1948. The IND station contains elevators, which make it compliant with the Americans with Disabilities Act of 1990 (ADA). While the IRT station can only be reached by elevators, it is not ADA-accessible. The IRT station's interior is listed on the National Register of Historic Places.

== History ==
=== IRT Broadway–Seventh Avenue Line ===
==== Construction and opening ====
Planning for a subway line in New York City dates to 1864, but development of what became the city's first subway line did not start until 1894, when the New York State Legislature passed the Rapid Transit Act. The subway plans were drawn up by a team of engineers led by William Barclay Parsons, the Rapid Transit Commission's chief engineer. It called for a subway line from New York City Hall in lower Manhattan to the Upper West Side, where two branches would lead north into the Bronx. A plan was formally adopted in 1897, and all legal conflicts over the route alignment were resolved near the end of 1899. The Rapid Transit Construction Company, organized by John B. McDonald and funded by August Belmont Jr., signed the initial Contract 1 with the Rapid Transit Commission in February 1900, under which it would construct the subway and maintain a 50-year operating lease from the opening of the line. In 1901, the firm of Heins & LaFarge was hired to design the underground stations. Belmont incorporated the Interborough Rapid Transit Company (IRT) in April 1902 to operate the subway.

The 168th Street station was constructed as part of the IRT's West Side Line (now the Broadway–Seventh Avenue Line) from 133rd Street to a point 100 feet (30 m) north of 182nd Street. Work on this section was conducted by L. B. McCabe & Brother, who started building the tunnel segment on May 14, 1900. On that date, a groundbreaking ceremony took place at Broadway and 156th Street, one block south of the 157th Street station site. The 168th Street station was one of three stations to be built within the deep-level Fort George Mine Tunnel. The station was equipped with elevators from its opening, since the IRT's contract with the city mandated elevators in stations that were more than 29 feet (8.8 m) deep. (Note: In practice, the elevator requirement was not enforced. The 33rd Street and Grand Central stations did not originally contain elevators, despite being more than 29 feet deep.) At the 168th Street station, the only means of access was via two elevators and a staircase, and the station cavern extended 150 feet (46 m) north and south of 168th Street.

The original New York City Subway line from City Hall to 145th Street on the West Side Branch opened in October 1904, with the line being extended to 157th Street a week later. The 168th and 181st Street stations had been scheduled to open on May 1, 1905, but the caverns and elevator shafts at these stations were not even fully excavated at the beginning of that year. Workers wanted to expedite the line's opening to serve baseball fans traveling to American League Park, the home of the Highlanders (now New York Yankees), which occupied the western side of Broadway from 165th to 168th Street. A train crashed into a temporary bulkhead at the south end of the station in March 1905; this caused a fire that weakened the tunnel's roof, which then collapsed and killed a firefighter. The damage caused by the crash delayed the station's completion by several months. Although the Fort George tunnel was nearly completed by January 1906, elevators had not been installed at the 168th and 181st Street stations.

The West Side Branch was extended northward from 157th Street to a temporary terminus at 221st Street, near the Harlem River Ship Canal, (Note: One New York Times article labeled the Harlem River Ship Canal station as being at 220th Street. However, others have referred to that station as being on 221st Street.) on March 12, 1906, with the station at 168th Street not yet open. This extension was initially served by shuttle trains operating between 157th Street and 221st Street. The 168th Street station opened for service on April 14, 1906. The station originally only had two elevators, each measuring 12 by 12 feet (3.7 m × 3.7 m), as well as a set of 119 steps; this contributed to serious overcrowding on the station's first day of operation. On May 30, 1906, express trains began running through to 221st Street. The opening of the first subway line helped contribute to the development of Washington Heights, although development around the 168th Street station was initially limited because of the presence of American League Park, as well as covenants that restricted development on many lots west of Broadway.

==== 1900s and 1910s ====
When the 168th Street station opened, the two elevators could fit only 50 passengers each, and they became severely overcrowded during peak times. During baseball games at American League Park, many fans opted to instead take the subway to 157th Street, then pay an additional 25 cents for a taxi to the stadium. The elevators' capacity limitations prompted the Public Service Commission to decide against constructing additional deep-level subway lines; newer routes, such as the Broadway and Lexington Avenue lines, were instead built using the cut-and-cover method. In Fiscal Year 1909, work was done to increase the carrying load of the elevators at the station. Officials had decided against adding additional elevators because it would only cost $6,300 to update the existing elevator cabs. By the early 1910s, the elevators could carry 80 people at once and were staffed by elevator operators.

To address overcrowding, in 1909, the New York Public Service Commission proposed lengthening the platforms at stations along the original IRT subway. As part of a modification to the IRT's construction contracts made on January 18, 1910, the company was to lengthen station platforms to accommodate ten-car express and six-car local trains. In addition to $1.5 million (equivalent to $51.8 million in 2025) spent on platform lengthening, $500,000 (equivalent to $17.3 million in 2025) was spent on building additional entrances and exits. It was anticipated that these improvements would increase capacity by 25 percent. The northbound platform at the 168th Street station was extended 179 feet (55 m) to the south. The arched ceiling adjacent to the platform extension was replaced with a flat roof made of steel beams, since the arch's structural integrity was compromised by the platform extension. The southbound platform was not lengthened. Six-car local trains began operating in October 1910, and ten-car express trains began running on the West Side Line on January 24, 1911. Subsequently, the station could accommodate six-car local trains, but ten-car trains could not open some of their doors.

==== 1920s to 1940s ====
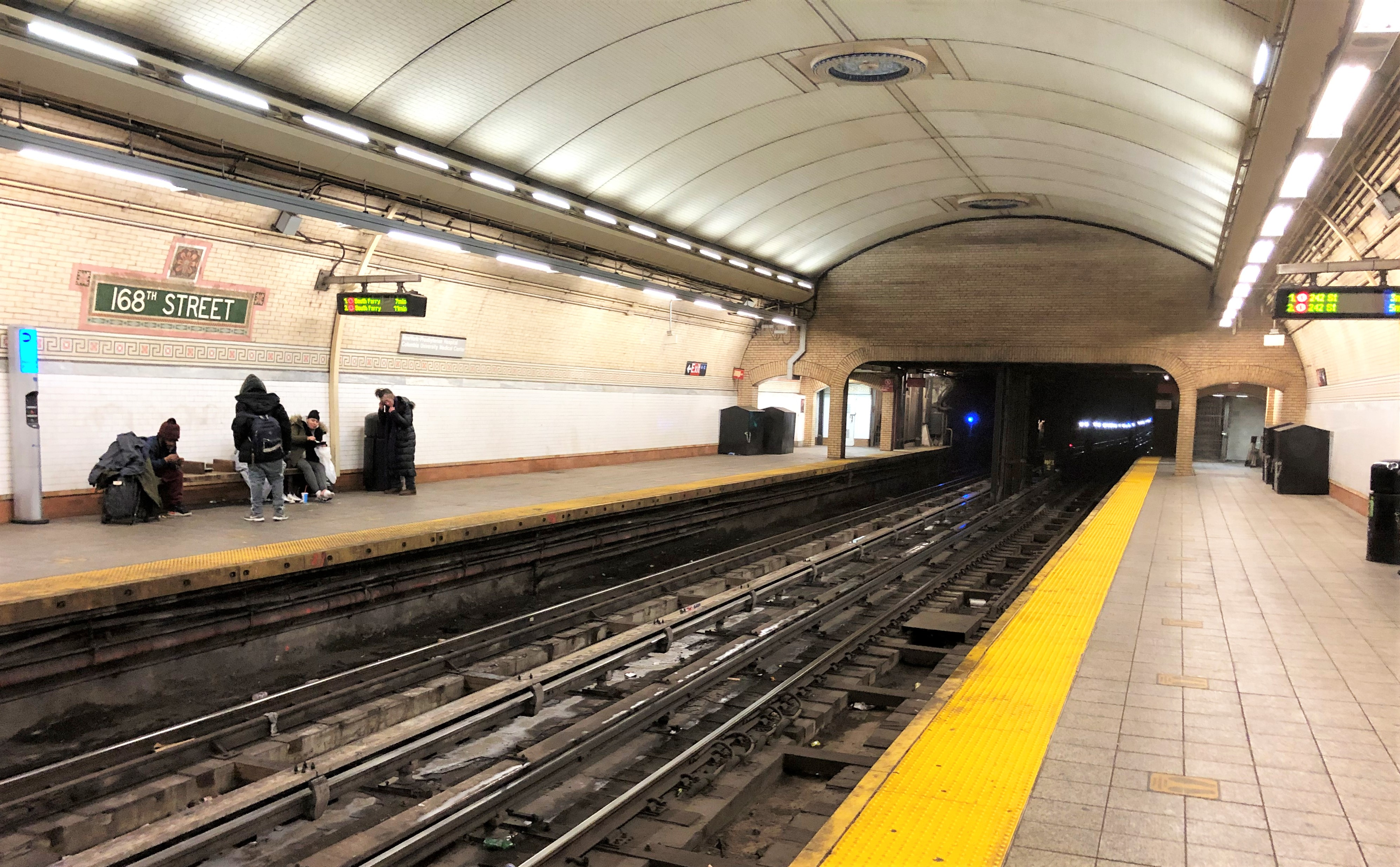
View of the IRT station's vault

Public Service Commission employees began preparing plans for an additional elevator at the station in 1919. The city government authorized the construction of additional elevators at the station in February 1922; there were to be four new shafts on the west side of Broadway, and elevator cabs were to be installed in two of the shafts. The city began receiving bids for the elevator shafts in April 1922, and they also awarded a contract for a new station entrance to Holbrook, Cabot & Rollins Corporation for $283,000 the next month. The city received bids for the elevator cabs that December and awarded the contract to the Otis Elevator Company. In Fiscal Year 1923, work began on the installation of a new entrance with elevators on the west side of Broadway to increase the capacity of the station. The following fiscal year, the IRT reported that work to construct new entrances to the station was 87 percent complete. The two elevators entered service on June 26, 1924.

The city government took over the IRT's operations on June 12, 1940. Platforms at IRT Broadway–Seventh Avenue Line stations between 103rd Street and 238th Street, including those at 168th Street, were lengthened to 514 feet (157 m) between 1946 and 1948, allowing full ten-car express trains to stop at these stations. A contract for the platform extensions at 168th Street and eight other stations on the line was awarded to Spencer, White & Prentis Inc. in October 1946, with an estimated cost of $3.891 million. The platform extensions at these stations were opened in stages. On April 6, 1948, the platform extension opened for stations from 103rd Street to Dyckman Street, including this station but excluding 125th Street.

=== IND Eighth Avenue Line ===
Plans for a second subway line with a station at 168th Street and Broadway date as far back as 1914. That year, engineer Reginald Pelham Bolton proposed a short extension of the elevated IRT Ninth Avenue Line to Riverside Drive, with an intermediate station at 168th Street and Broadway to relieve congestion at the IRT subway stop there. The Transit Commission proposed another subway line to Broadway and 168th Street, an unbuilt extension of the Brooklyn–Manhattan Transit Corporation's Broadway Line, in 1922.

New York City mayor John Francis Hylan's original plans for the Independent Subway System (IND), proposed in 1922, included building over 100 mi (160 km) of new lines and taking over nearly 100 mi (160 km) of existing lines. The lines were designed to compete with the existing underground, surface, and elevated lines operated by the IRT and Brooklyn–Manhattan Transit Corporation (BMT). On December 9, 1924, the New York City Board of Transportation (BOT) gave preliminary approval to the construction of a subway line along Eighth Avenue, running from 207th Street. The BOT announced a list of stations on the new line in February 1928, with an express station at 167th Street; this station would be the northern terminus of local service. Most of the Eighth Avenue Line was dug using a cheap cut-and-cover method. In September 1928, the Woodcrest Construction Company received a $375,014 contract to construct the 155th Street, 163rd Street, and 168th Street stations on the new line.

A preview event for the new subway was hosted on September 8, 1932, two days before the official opening. The Eighth Avenue Line station opened on September 10, 1932, as part of the city-operated IND's initial segment, the Eighth Avenue Line between Chambers Street and 207th Street. There was a direct connection with the IRT station at 168th Street; initially, passengers had to pay an additional fare to transfer between the IRT and the IND. Construction of the whole line cost $191.2 million (equivalent to $4,511.9 million in 2025). While the IRT Broadway–Seventh Avenue Line already provided service to Washington Heights, the new Eighth Avenue subway via St. Nicholas Avenue provided an alternative route. In particular, the IND's 168th Street station provided easy access to the Columbia University Irving Medical Center, as trains from 168th Street could reach Lower Manhattan within a half hour.

=== Consolidation into single complex ===
When the IND station opened, it was connected to the IRT station at the same intersection via a passageway. This corridor originally required payment of an additional fare, but it was placed inside fare control on July 1, 1948.

==== 1950s to 1970s ====
On December 28, 1950, the New York City Board of Transportation issued a report concerning the construction of bomb shelters in the subway system. Five deep stations in Washington Heights, including the IRT's 168th Street station, were considered to be ideal for being used as bomb-proof shelters. The program was expected to cost $104 million (equivalent to $1.392 billion in 2025). These shelters were expected to provide limited protection against conventional bombs, while providing protection against shock waves and air blast, as well as from the heat and radiation from an atomic bomb. To become suitable as shelters, the stations would require water-supply facilities, first-aid rooms, and additional bathrooms. However, the program, which required federal funding, was never completed.

To increase passenger flow, officials replaced the IND station's pocket-change booths with high turnstiles in 1957, which prompted many complaints from passengers. In Fiscal Year 1958, two elevators at the IRT station were replaced with automatic ones, which began operating in January 1958. Fluorescent lighting at the IRT station was installed during Fiscal Year 1961. The 168th Street station was a major transfer hub for interstate buses to New Jersey until the 1960s, when the nearby George Washington Bridge Bus Station opened; the last interstate bus stop was relocated in 1967. By 1970, the 168th Street station on the Eighth Avenue Line was among the subway system's 12 worst bottlenecks for passenger flow. The New York City Transit Authority (NYCTA) was considering renovating the 168th Street station by 1975. The station's token booth was closed at some point during the 1970s but reopened in 1979.

==== 1980s and 1990s ====
The Broadway–Seventh Avenue Line station was renovated in the late 1980s. By 1988, the project had been delayed by 20 months due to changes in the project's scope; the overpass and platform walls had yet to be restored. The renovation was completed in 1990 at a cost of $2.5 million. The project included relocating pipes and ducts, retiling the lower portions of the walls, and removing dirt from the vaulted ceiling. The NYCTA's director of architecture had wanted to clean the ceiling, but this would have required the installation of scaffolding, and the NYCTA could only use a chemical solution that was less potent than most chemical-cleaning solutions.

By the early 1990s, many homeless people were sheltered within the 168th Street station and the tunnels near it; the city's largest homeless shelter was nearby. The MTA closed one of the station's entrances in March 1991 due to concerns about crime. Although the closed entrance had recorded over 50 felonies per year, some locals opposed the closure because it would create inconvenience. Passengers also frequently complained that the IRT station was overheating during the summer, prompting the Metropolitan Transportation Authority (MTA) to operate one of the station's fans all the time in 1991. This was not repeated during 1992 because one of the station's fans had broken. The MTA installed a ventilation shaft for the IRT station in 1993 to alleviate overheating. During the early 1990s, the MTA also removed three of the station's high entry-exit turnstiles to increase passenger flow.

The IRT station's elevators gained a reputation for unreliability. Newsday, in 1992, reported that one of the station's elevators had recorded 40 outages in six months and was non-functional for a quarter of that time. Between July 5 and September 8, 1997, trains did not stop at the IRT station while the elevators were modernized. The NYCTA opted to close the station entirely because it would have taken two years to replace the elevators one at a time and because the staircase to the station could not handle the 18,000 passengers that used the station every day. A shuttle bus service was provided to 181st Street on the Broadway–Seventh Avenue Line during the station's closure. The project cost $4 million (equivalent to $8.0 million in 2025).

==== 2000s to present ====
Several of the elevators in the station are staffed by elevator attendants, who are also employed at four other deep-level stations in Washington Heights. The elevator attendants are intended to reassure passengers, as the elevators are the only entrance to the platforms, and passengers often wait for the elevators with an attendant. The attendants at the five stations are primarily maintenance and cleaning workers who suffered injuries that made it hard for them to continue doing their original jobs. In July 2003, to reduce costs, the MTA announced that as part of its 2004 budget it would eliminate 22 elevator operator positions at the IRT's 168th Street station and four others in Washington Heights, leaving one full-time operator per station. The agency had intended to remove all the attendants at these stops, but kept one in each station after many riders protested. In addition, the MTA began operating all elevators at all times; prior to the change, each elevator only operated if it was staffed by an elevator operator. The change took effect on January 20, 2004, and was expected to save $1.15 million a year.

In November 2007, the MTA proposed savings cuts to help reduce the agency's deficit. As part of the plan, all elevator operators at 168th Street, along with those in four other stations in Washington Heights, would have been cut. MTA employees had joined riders in worrying about an increase in crime as a result of the cuts after an elevator operator at 181st Street on the Broadway–Seventh Avenue Line helped save a stabbed passenger. The move was intended to save $1.7 million a year. However, on December 7, 2007, the MTA announced that it would not remove the remaining elevator operators at these stations, due to pushback from elected officials and residents from the area. In October 2018, the MTA once again proposed removing the elevator operators at the five stations, but this was reversed after dissent from the Transport Workers' Union. The MTA again suggested reassigning elevator operators to station-cleaner positions in June 2023, prompting local politicians to sue to prevent the operators' reassignments.

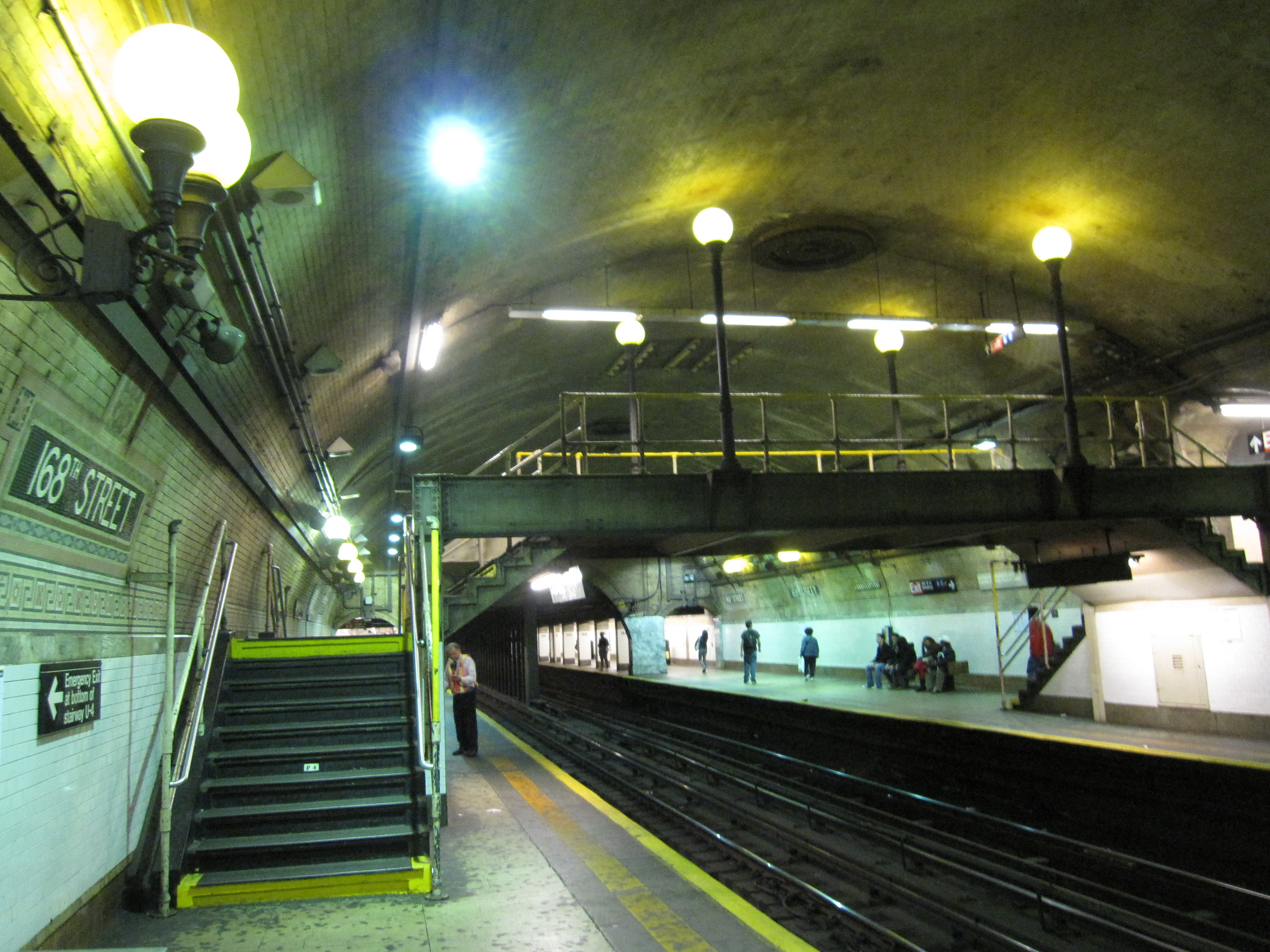
IRT station, pre-renovation

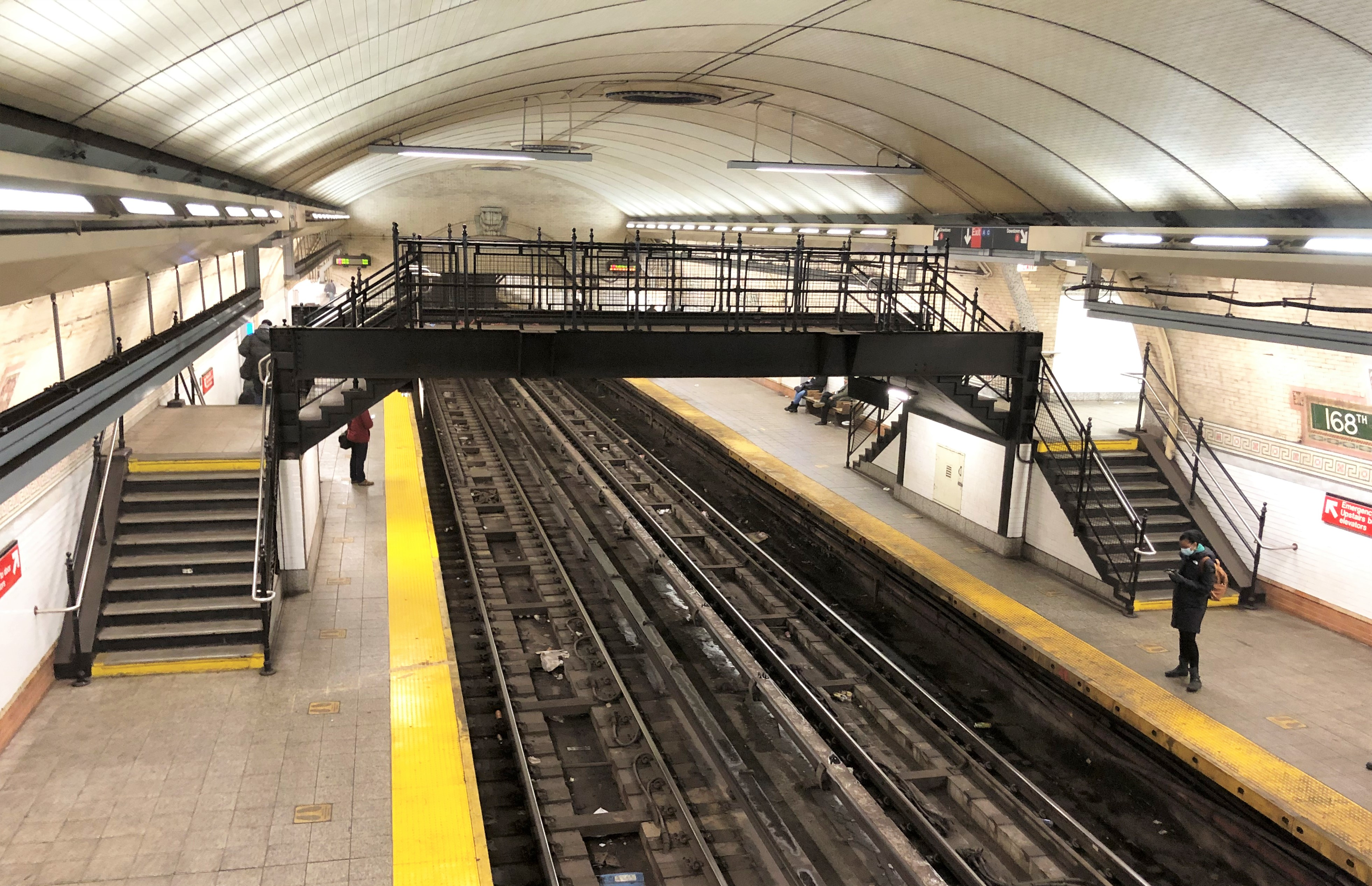
Post-renovation

The IRT station was added to the National Register of Historic Places in 2005. The IRT elevators remained unreliable in the early 21st century; in 2007 alone, one of the station's elevators malfunctioned 18 times while passengers were inside. From 2013 to 2016, the IRT station was partially renovated, with the station ceiling and northbound platform tilework replaced with replicas and flooring replaced. After a series of elevator malfunctions in 2017, elected officials began advocating for the replacement of the IRT station's elevators, which were nearly twice as old as the average elevator in the New York City Subway system. By then, the elevators broke down hundreds of times per year, inconveniencing passengers who needed to travel to Columbia University Medical Center. From January 5 to December 20, 2019, the IRT station was closed so the elevator cars could be replaced, and elevator shafts, mechanical components, and the stairways could be upgraded. During this time, a free out-of-system transfer was provided to the A train at Inwood–207th Street, from both 207th Street and 215th Street.

The IND station was planned to be renovated starting in 2016 as part of the 2010–2014 MTA Capital Program. An MTA study conducted in 2015 found that 48 percent of components in the IND station were out of date. According to a study conducted by New York University researchers and published in 2024, the 168th Street IRT station had some of the highest particulate matter pollution levels of any subway station in New York City.

=== Service history ===
==== IRT station ====
After the first subway line was completed in 1908, the station was served by West Side local and express trains. Express trains began at South Ferry in Manhattan or Atlantic Avenue in Brooklyn, and ended at 242nd Street in the Bronx. Local trains ran from City Hall to 242nd Street during rush hours, continuing south from City Hall to South Ferry at other times. In 1918, the Broadway–Seventh Avenue Line opened south of Times Square–42nd Street, and the original line was divided into an H-shaped system. The original subway north of Times Square thus became part of the Broadway–Seventh Avenue Line. Local trains were sent to South Ferry, while express trains used the new Clark Street Tunnel to Brooklyn.

The IRT routes at the station were given numbered designations in 1948 with the introduction of "R-type" rolling stock, which contained rollsigns with numbered designations for each service. The route to 242nd Street became known as the 1. All 1 trains became local in 1959, and increased and lengthened service was implemented during peak hours on the 1 train on February 6, 1959. In April 1988, the New York City Transit Authority (NYCTA) unveiled plans to speed up service on the Broadway–Seventh Avenue Line through the implementation of a skip-stop service: the 9 train. When skip-stop service started in 1989, it was only implemented north of 137th Street–City College on weekdays, and 168th Street was served by both the 1 and the 9. Skip-stop service ended on May 27, 2005, as a result of a decrease in the number of riders who benefited.

==== IND station ====
The A express train has always served the IND station since its inception in 1932. Local service was initially provided by the AA train from 168th Street to Chambers Street/Hudson Terminal; at the time, local services were denoted by double letters and express services by single letters. The AA was discontinued in 1933 when the CC began running on the local tracks along the Eighth Avenue and Concourse lines.

The original BB train started running with the opening of the Sixth Avenue Line on December 15, 1940, ran as a rush-hour only local service starting at 168th Street–Washington Heights. The "B" designation was originally intended to designate express trains originating in Washington Heights and going to Midtown Manhattan on the Sixth Avenue Line. The AA was resurrected when the BB was created, running outside rush hours. The AA was renamed the K in 1985, while the BB was renamed the B. The K train was completely replaced by the C's midday service on December 11, 1988, with all local service at 168th Street being provided by the B. On March 1, 1998, the B and the C switched northern terminals, ending B service to Washington Heights; the C began serving the station at all times except late nights.

== Station layout ==
The IRT platforms are very deep, with the only public connection between the platforms and fare control being made via elevator. Close to street level is an upper mezzanine level with an unstaffed fare control area. Four elevators lead down to a lower mezzanine below the IRT platforms. At the upper mezzanine, a closed passageway exists behind the elevator bank.

The IRT's 168th Street station was one of the few on the original IRT line to contain elevators. The IRT station is one of three stations in the New York City Subway system that can be accessed solely by elevators. The other two, also located on the Broadway–Seventh Avenue Line, are 181st Street one stop to the north, as well as Clark Street on the 2 and 3 trains in Brooklyn. However, the IRT station is not ADA-accessible. As part of the 2017 Fast Forward plan to modernize the subway system, 50 more stations will become ADA-accessible during the MTA's 2020–2024 Capital Program, allowing all riders to have an accessible station within two stops in either direction. To meet this goal, one station in the Washington Heights/Inwood area will have to be made accessible on the IRT Broadway–Seventh Avenue Line. The 168th Street station was ultimately selected to be retrofitted as part of the plan. The accessibility project was to be funded by congestion pricing in New York City, but it was postponed in June 2024 after the implementation of congestion pricing was delayed.

A slightly sloped corridor within fare control leads between the IRT and IND mezzanines. A full-length mezzanine extends above the IND platforms. Elevators from the mezzanine to the street, and to each IND platform, make that portion of the station ADA-accessible.

=== Exits ===
The full-time fare control area is at the center of the mezzanine, and has a turnstile bank, token booth, and one staircase and one elevator going up to the southeast corner of West 168th Street and Saint Nicholas Avenue. The part-time side at the north end of the mezzanine has HEET turnstiles and three staircases, two to the southwest corner of Broadway and 169th Street and one to the northwest corner. An exit-only turnstile in the middle of the mezzanine, near the corridor leading to the IRT platforms, leads to a staircase going up to north end of Mitchell Square Park on the south side of West 168th Street between Broadway and Saint Nicholas Avenue.

The passageway leading to the IRT elevators is just beyond the full-time fare control area. There are two exit stairs past this part-time fare control area, near the southwest corner of Broadway and 168th Street, which face north and south.

The southernmost portion of the mezzanine, which is outside fare control, is closed. It features one passage on the east side of the IND station with two exits to the southeastern corner of 167th Street and St. Nicholas Avenue and a passage on the west side of the IND station with two exits to Mitchel Square Park. The closed mezzanine area is now used for New York City Transit employees only. The western area was closed in the 1980s for safety reasons, while the eastern area was closed in 1992.

== IRT Broadway–Seventh Avenue Line platforms ==
168 Street
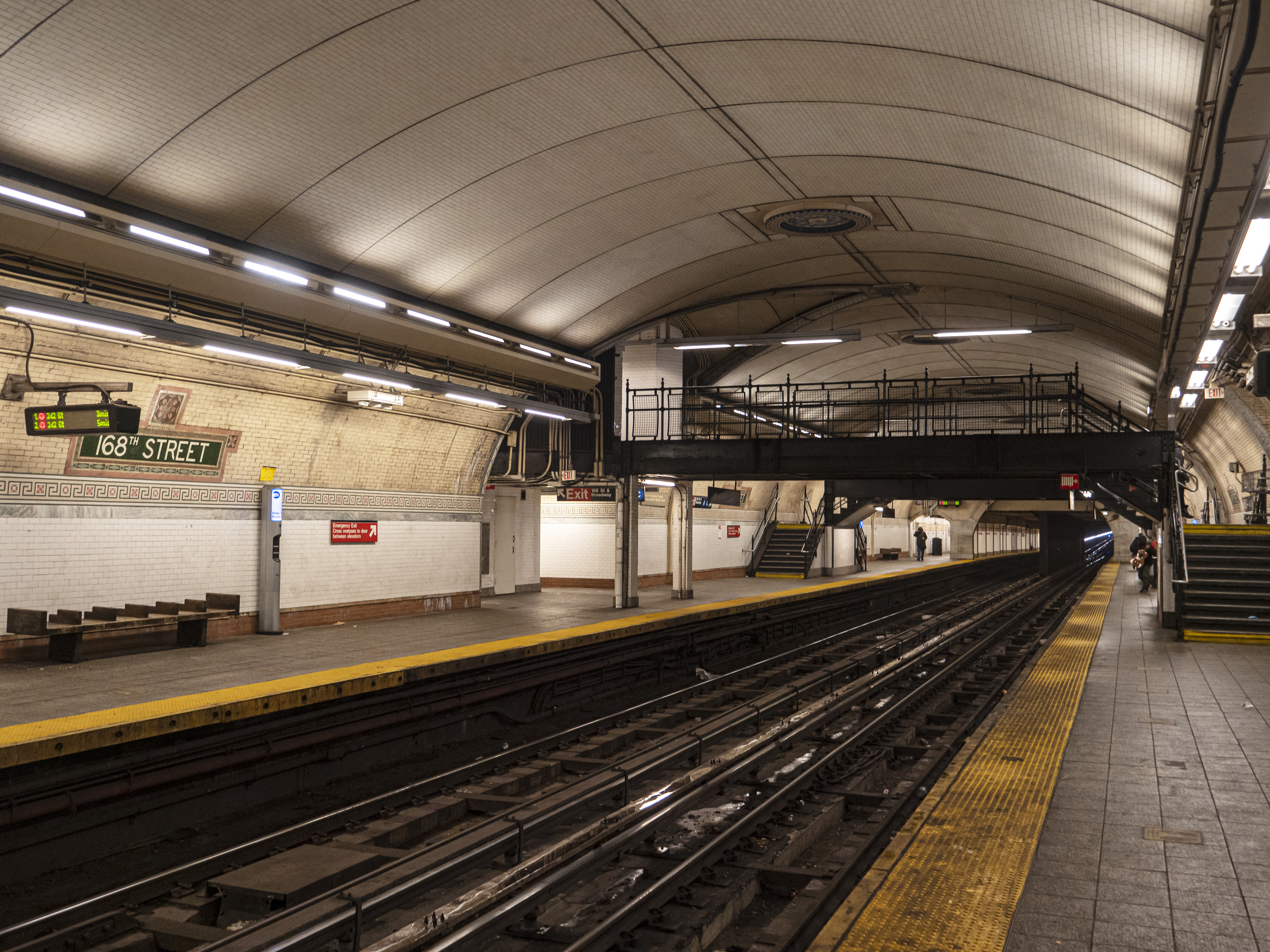
- View from southbound platform

Station statistics
- Division: A (IRT)
- Line: IRT Broadway–Seventh Avenue Line
- Services: 1 (all times)
- Structure: Underground
- Platforms: 2 side platforms
- Tracks: 2

Other information
- Opened: April 14, 1906 (120 years ago)
- Closed: January 5, 2019 (7 years ago)
- Rebuilt: December 20, 2019 (6 years ago)
- Accessible: Partially; access to mezzanine only, access to platforms planned
- Former/other names: Washington Heights-168th Street station
Services
Preceding station	New York City Subway	Following station
181st Street toward Van Cortlandt Park–242nd Street	1 (New York City Subway service)	157th Street toward South Ferry
Track layout
Station service legend
Symbol	Description
Stops all times	Stops all times
- 168th Street Subway Station (IRT)
- U.S. National Register of Historic Places
- New York State Register of Historic Places
- MPS: New York City Subway System MPS
- NRHP reference No.: 05000232
- NYSRHP No.: 06101.007634

Significant dates
- Added to NRHP: March 30, 2005
- Designated NYSRHP: December 18, 2004

The 168th Street station (sometimes announced on the trains as the Washington Heights-168th Street station) on the IRT Broadway–Seventh Avenue Line has two tracks and two side platforms, and is served by the 1 train at all times. The station is between 181st Street to the north and 157th Street to the south. It is one of three in the deep-level Fort George Mine Tunnel, along with the 181st Street and 191st Street stations to the north; the tunnel allows the Broadway–Seventh Avenue Line to travel under the high terrain of Washington Heights. Sources disagree on the station's depth, which has been variously cited as 99 feet (30 m), 100 feet (30 m), or 117 feet (36 m). The station was originally 320 feet (98 m) long but was extended to fit 514-foot-long (157 m) trains in 1948.

Near the north end of the station, there are four elevators adjacent to the southbound platform, which lead to the fare control level. These elevators are accessed via a concourse several steps above the southbound platform. The lower sections of the concourse walls are clad with white tile, topped by a band of green tile, while the tops of the walls and the ceilings are made of concrete. Two footbridges with staircases connect the platforms. The elevators rise 76 feet (23 m) to the upper mezzanine level, which connects with the IND platforms. A rear passageway at the lower mezzanine level allows passengers to board and alight on different sides of the elevator cabs.

The northern open bridge and northbound platform features a passageway east of the northbound side to an eastern elevator shaft. This shaft contained the two original elevators to and from the platforms. Each shaft measured 15 by 32 feet (4.6 by 9.8 m) wide. The eastern elevator shaft are planned to be reused for ADA accessibility to at least the northbound platform.

There is also a stairway on the extreme northern end of both platforms, which ascends to a relay and signal power room. This stairway is not visible to the public.

=== Design ===
Much of the station is contained within a vault that measures 47 feet (14 m) wide and 26 feet (7.9 m) high. The lowest 6 feet (1.8 m) of the vault walls are wainscoted with rust-colored brick. Atop the brick wainscoting are a belt course made of marble and a multicolored mosaic frieze measuring about 16 inches (410 mm) thick. The tops of the walls contain tan brick. Tile name tablets are placed above the frieze at regular intervals, with white letters on a dark-green background surrounded by floral designs. These tablets contain the text "168th Street". The center of the vault ceiling has multicolored terracotta medallions at regular intervals; these formerly held lighting fixtures. Where the elevator shafts are positioned, the station widens to 73 feet (22 m).

The station's platform extensions have ceilings that are 10 to 12 feet (3.0 to 3.7 m) above the platform level. At the portals between the original vault and the much lower ceilings of the platform extensions, there is a wide arch over the tracks flanked by narrow arches over each platform. These transitions are clad with tan brick. The arch over the tracks has a volute with a laurel wreath. Between the arches, the lower portions of the walls are clad in gray marble. The walls of the platform extensions have white ceramic tiles with mosaic friezes as well as plaques with the words "168th Street". The walls are divided every 15 feet (4.6 m) by multicolored tile pilasters that are 16 inches (410 mm) wide. There are two tile panels with the number "168" in each panel. Columns near the platform edge, clad with white tile, support the jack-arched concrete station roof.

=== Gallery ===
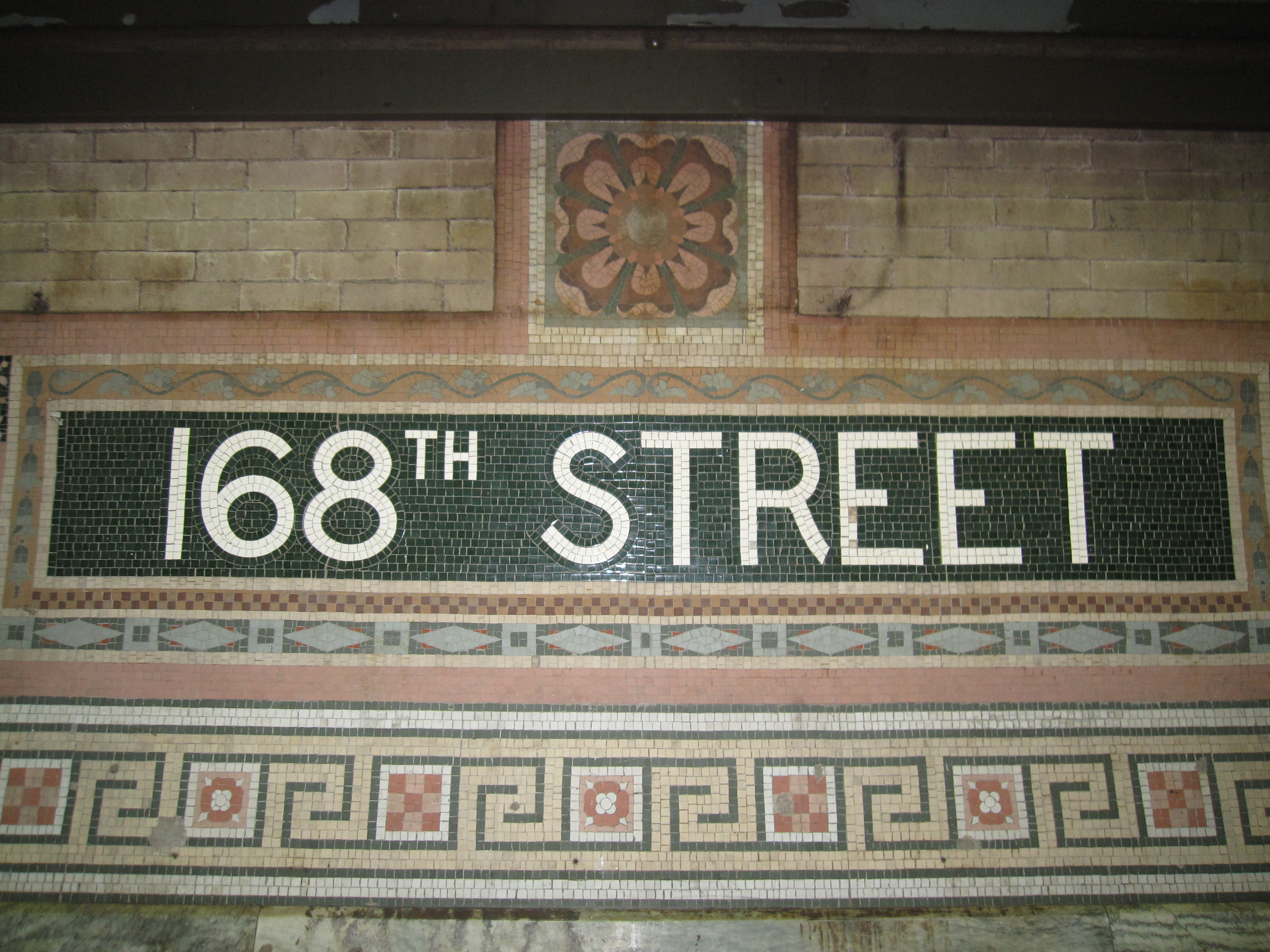
Mosaic name tablet

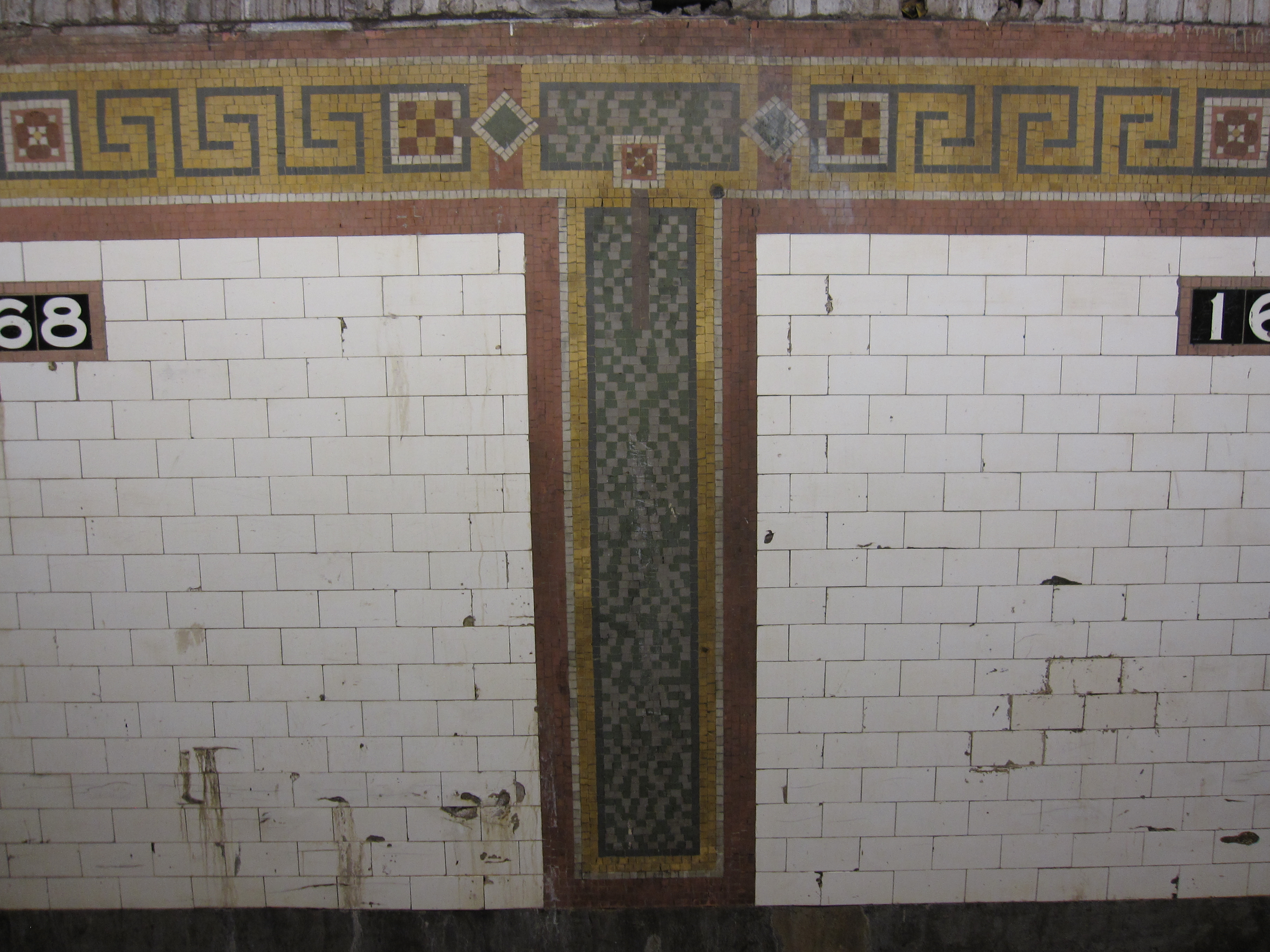
Details of the mosaic work on the wall

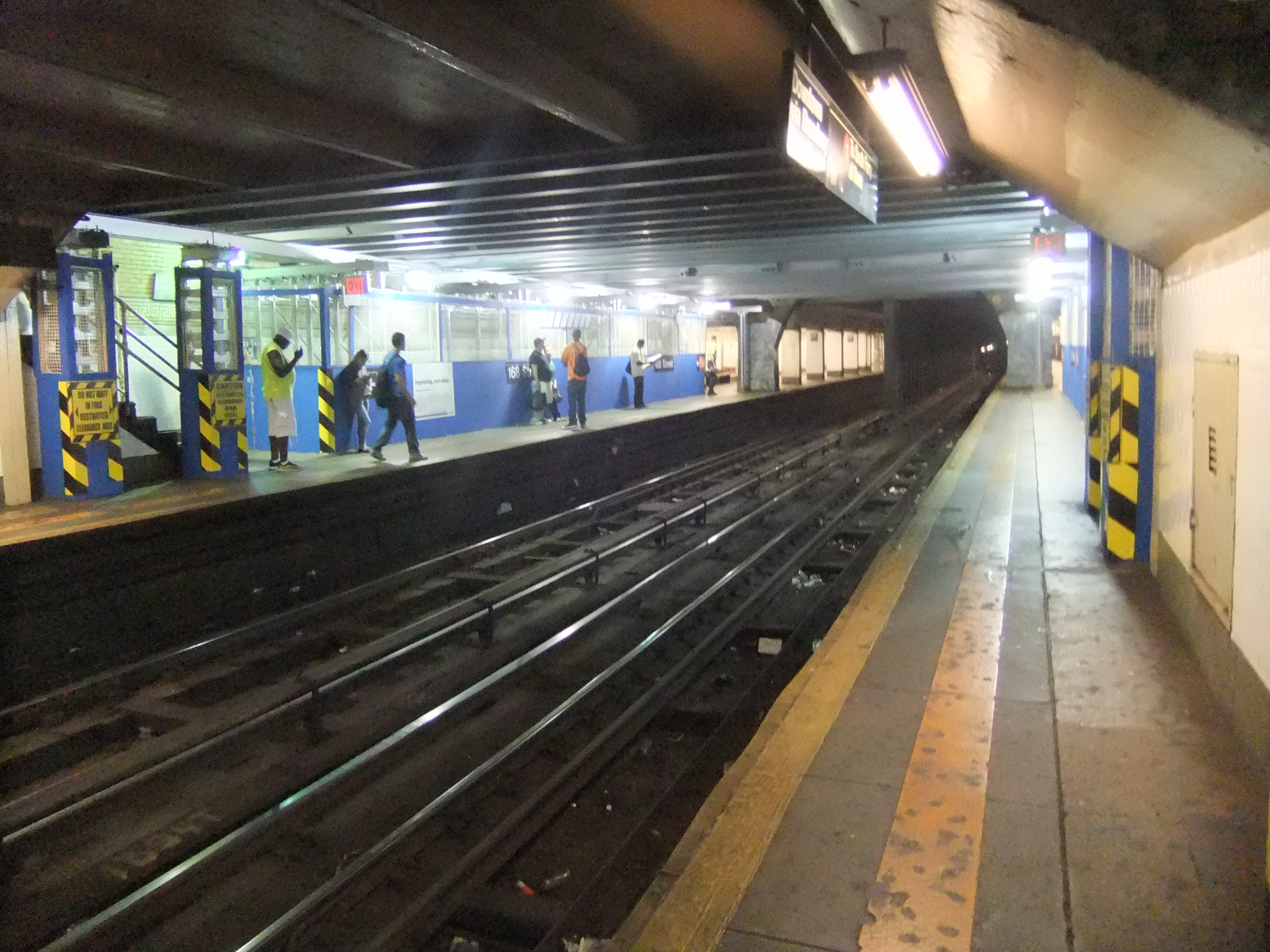
Middle of uptown platform under renovation in 2013

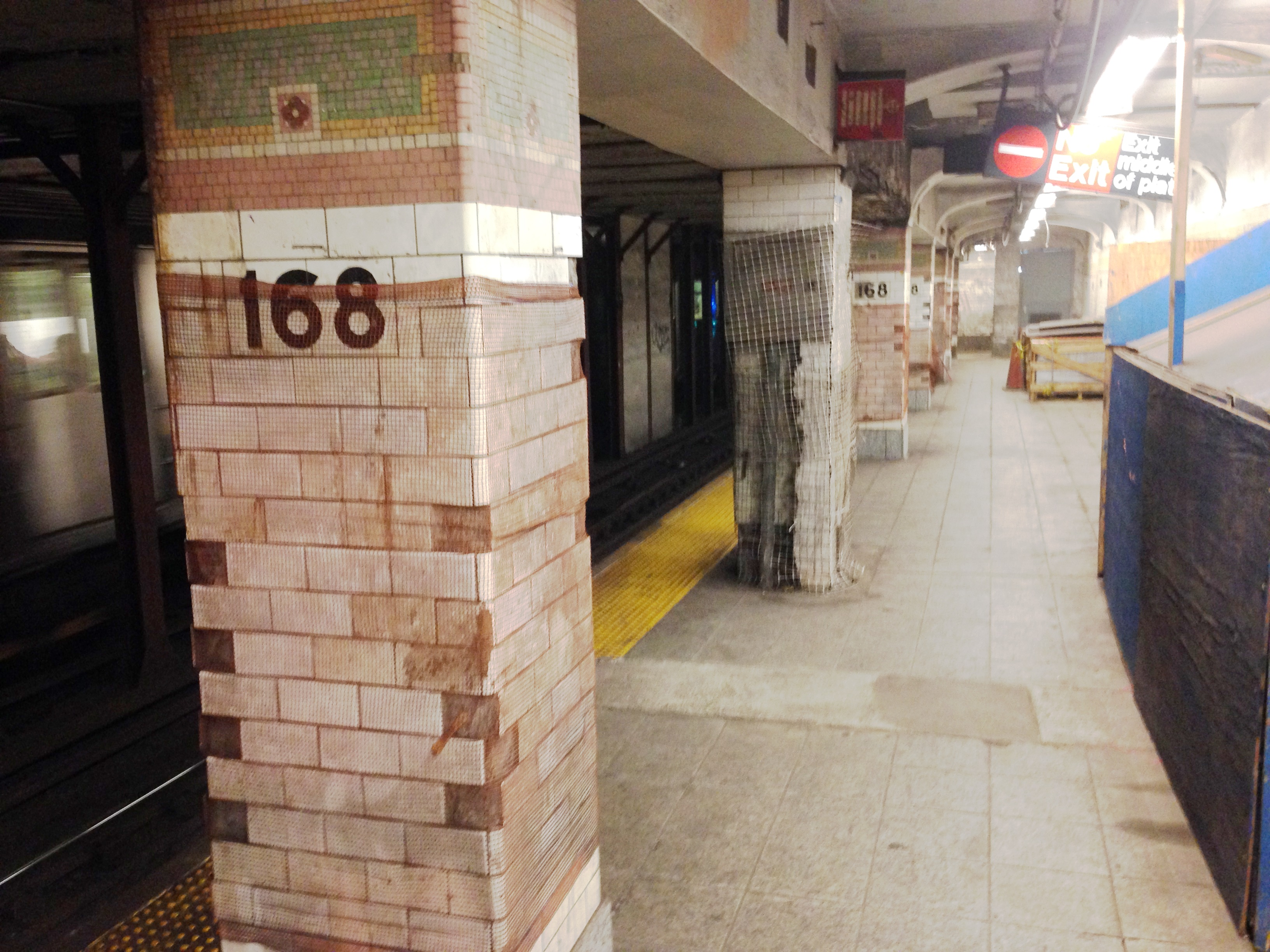
The southbound platform under reconstruction in 2015

== IND Eighth Avenue Line platforms ==
168 Street
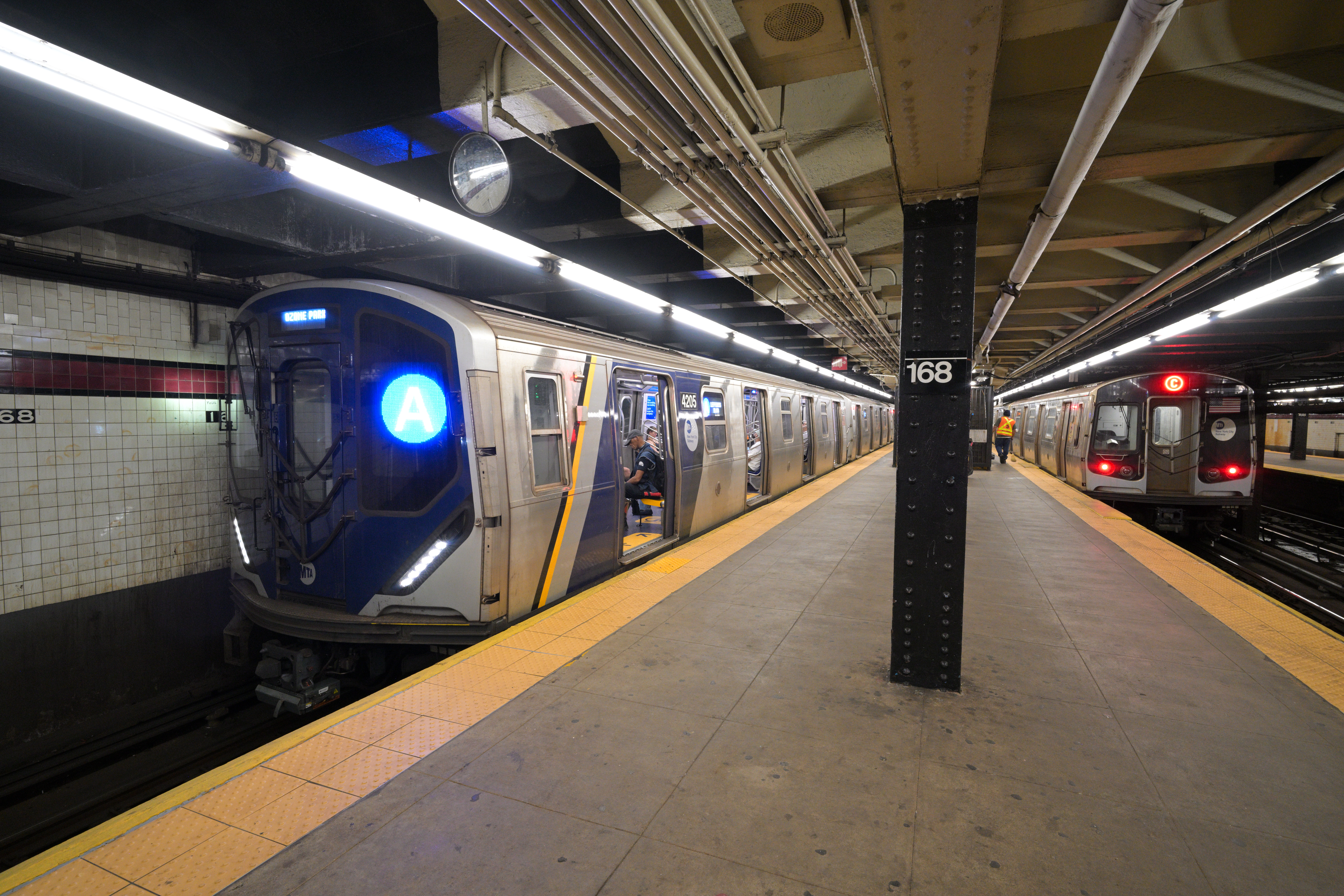
- A and C trains on the downtown platform

Station statistics
- Division: B (IND)
- Line: IND Eighth Avenue Line
- Services: A (all times); C (all except late nights)
- Structure: Underground
- Platforms: 2 island platforms cross-platform interchange
- Tracks: 4

Other information
- Opened: September 10, 1932 (94 years ago)
- Accessible: Yes (IND Eighth Avenue Line platforms only)
Services
Preceding station	New York City Subway	Following station
175th Street A toward Inwood–207th Street	Express	145th Street A toward Far Rockaway–Mott Avenue or Ozone Park–Lefferts Boulevard
Terminus	Local	163rd Street–Amsterdam Avenue A C toward Euclid Avenue
Track layout
Station service legend
Symbol	Description
Stops all times except late nights	Stops all times except late nights
Stops all times	Stops all times
Stops late nights only	Stops late nights only

The 168th Street station is an express station on the IND Eighth Avenue Line that has four tracks and two island platforms. The A train stops here at all times, making express stops during the day and local stops during the night; and the C train stops here except at night and always makes local stops. The station is the northern terminus for C trains; the next station to the north is 175th Street for A trains. The next station to the south is 163rd Street–Amsterdam Avenue for local trains and 145th Street for express trains.

Unlike other express stations in the subway system, the express tracks, used by the A train, are on the outside and the local tracks, used by the C train, are on the inside. This is to make it easier for C trains to originate and terminate here, and turn around north of the station to make the southbound trip to Brooklyn. South of this station, the outer express tracks descend to a lower level below the inner local tracks, creating a two-over-two track layout. North of the station, the inner local tracks continue north underneath Broadway to the 174th Street Yard, while the outer express tracks turn sharply under Fort Washington Avenue and continue for four more stations before terminating at Inwood–207th Street. During the night, the A train makes local stops, using the northbound local track before crossing over to the express one afterwards and the southbound express track before crossing over to the local one afterwards.

Both outer track walls have a maroon trim line with a black border and small "168" tile captions below them in white numbering on a black border. The maroon trim line was part of a color-coded tile system used throughout the IND. The tile colors were designed to facilitate navigation for travelers going away from Lower Manhattan. Because 168th Street is the northernmost express station on the Eighth Avenue Line, the color-coded tiles at stations north of 168th Street were originally maroon. (Note: The 175th Street and Dyckman Street stations do not have colored tile bands.) This station has a full-length mezzanine above the platforms and tracks. Black I-beam columns run along the platform, alternating ones having the standard black name plate with white lettering.

=== Gallery ===
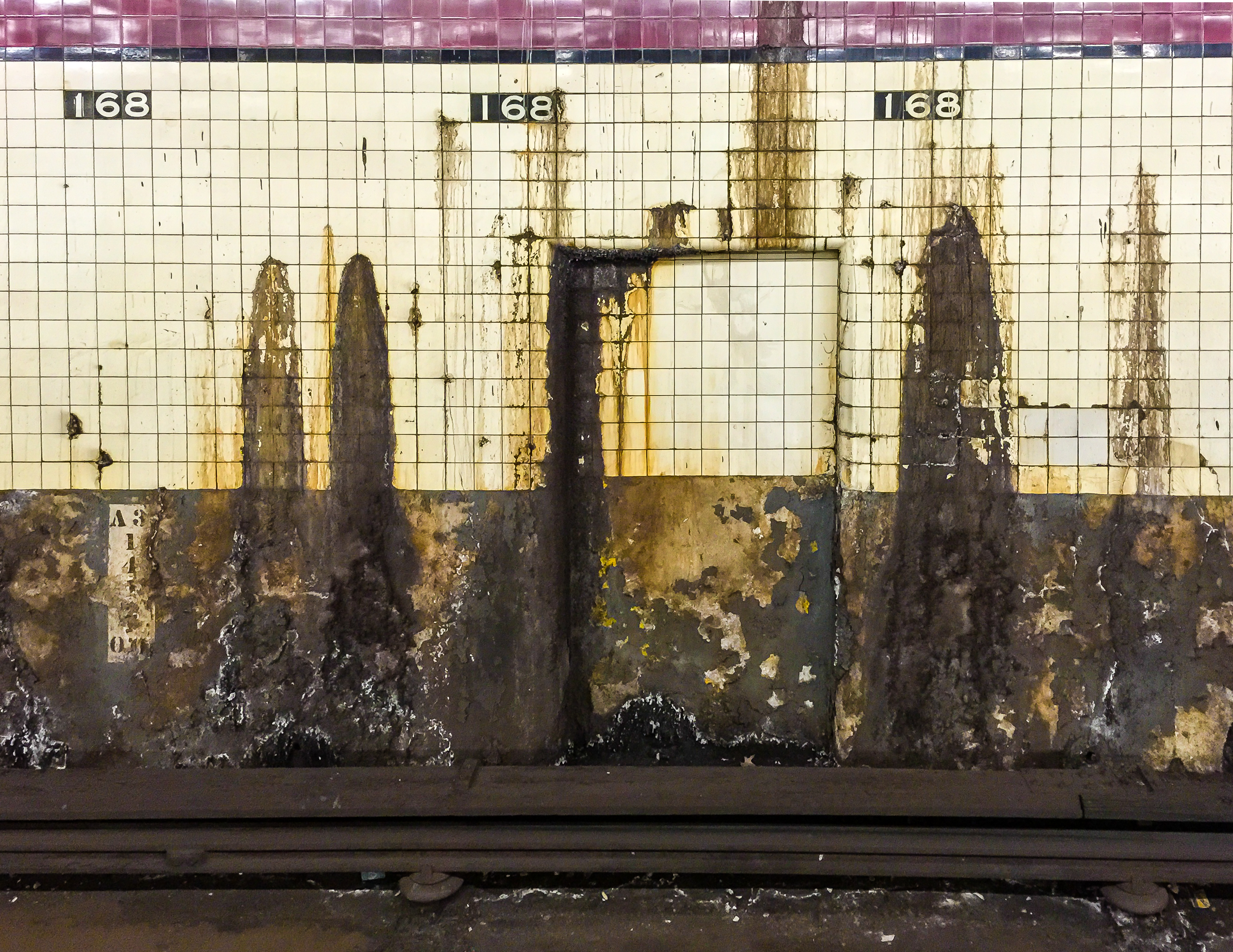
Deteriorating walls

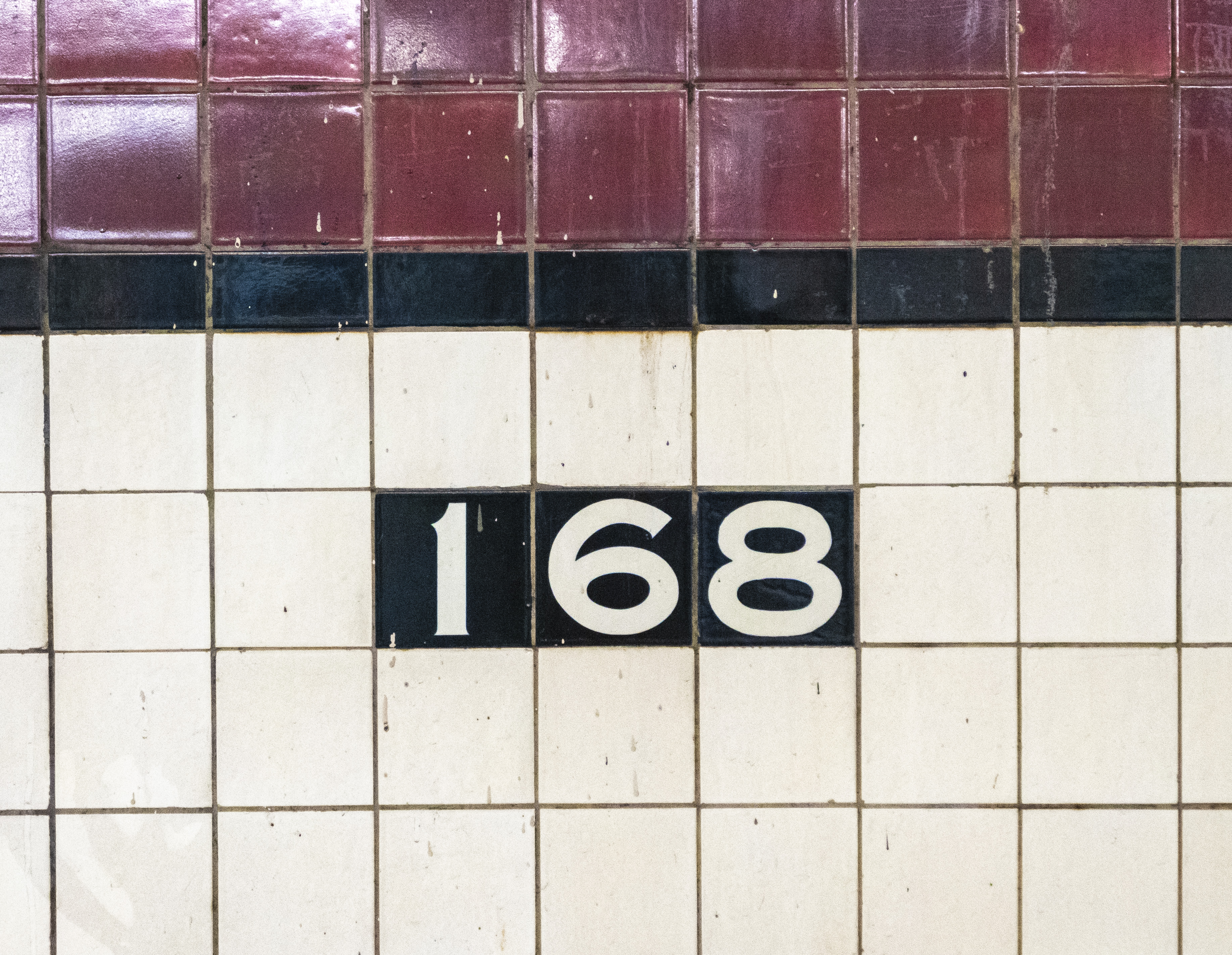
Close up of tile caption

== Nearby points of interest ==
Nearby points of interest include NewYork-Presbyterian Hospital/Columbia University Medical Center, Fort Washington Armory, Fort Washington Park on the Hudson River waterfront, and remnants of the Audubon Ballroom.

== See also ==
- National Register of Historic Places listings in Manhattan above 110th Street
