= 155th Street =

155th Street may refer to 155th Street (Manhattan) or to the following New York City Subway stations there:

- 155th Street (IND Eighth Avenue Line), at St. Nicholas Avenue; serving the A and C trains
- 155th Street (IND Concourse Line), at Frederick Douglass Boulevard; serving the B and D trains
- 155th Street (IRT Ninth Avenue Line), demolished
