= 155th Division =

In military terms, 155th Division or 155th Infantry Division may refer to:

- 155th Division (People's Republic of China)
- 155th Infantry Division (Wehrmacht)
- 155th Reserve Panzer Division, Wehrmacht, Germany
- 155th Infantry Division "Emilia", Italy, World War II
- 155th Division (Imperial Japanese Army)
- 155th Motor Rifle Division, Soviet Union
- 155th Rifle Division, Soviet Union

== See also ==
- List of military divisions by number
- 155th Brigade (disambiguation)
- 155th Regiment (disambiguation)
- 155th (disambiguation)
