= 155th Regiment =

155th Regiment may refer to:

- 155th Artillery Regiment "Emilia"
- 155th Infantry Regiment (United States)
- 155th (Mixed) Heavy Anti-Aircraft Regiment, Royal Artillery
- 155th (Wessex) Transport Regiment, a unit of the United Kingdom Territorial Army

== American Civil War regiments ==
- 155th Illinois Infantry Regiment
- 155th Indiana Infantry Regiment
- 155th New York Infantry Regiment
- 155th Ohio Infantry Regiment
- 155th Pennsylvania Infantry Regiment

== See also ==
- 155th Division (disambiguation)
