= 155th Division (People's Republic of China) =

155th Division (1948–1950)
- Active: 1948.11 - 1950.4
- Country: People's Republic of China
- Branch: People's Liberation Army
- Type: Division
- Role: Infantry
- Part of: 42nd Corps
- Engagements: Chinese Civil War

The 155th Division(Chinese: 第155师) was created in November 1948 under the Regulation of the Redesignations of All Organizations and Units of the Army, issued by Central Military Commission on November 1, 1948, basing on the 9th Independent Division of Northeastern People's Liberation Army, formed in January.

The division was a part of 42nd Corps. Under the flag of 155th division it took part in the Chinese Civil War. The division moved to Korea in February 1950 and Korean elements of it were used to form the 7th Division of the Korean People's Army.

In April 1950 the division was disbanded, and its divisional HQ was re-organized as HQ of 8th Artillery Division.

As of disbandment the division was composed of:

- 463rd Regiment;
- 464th Regiment;
- 465th Regiment.
