= Moyenneville, Somme =

Moyenneville
- Commune
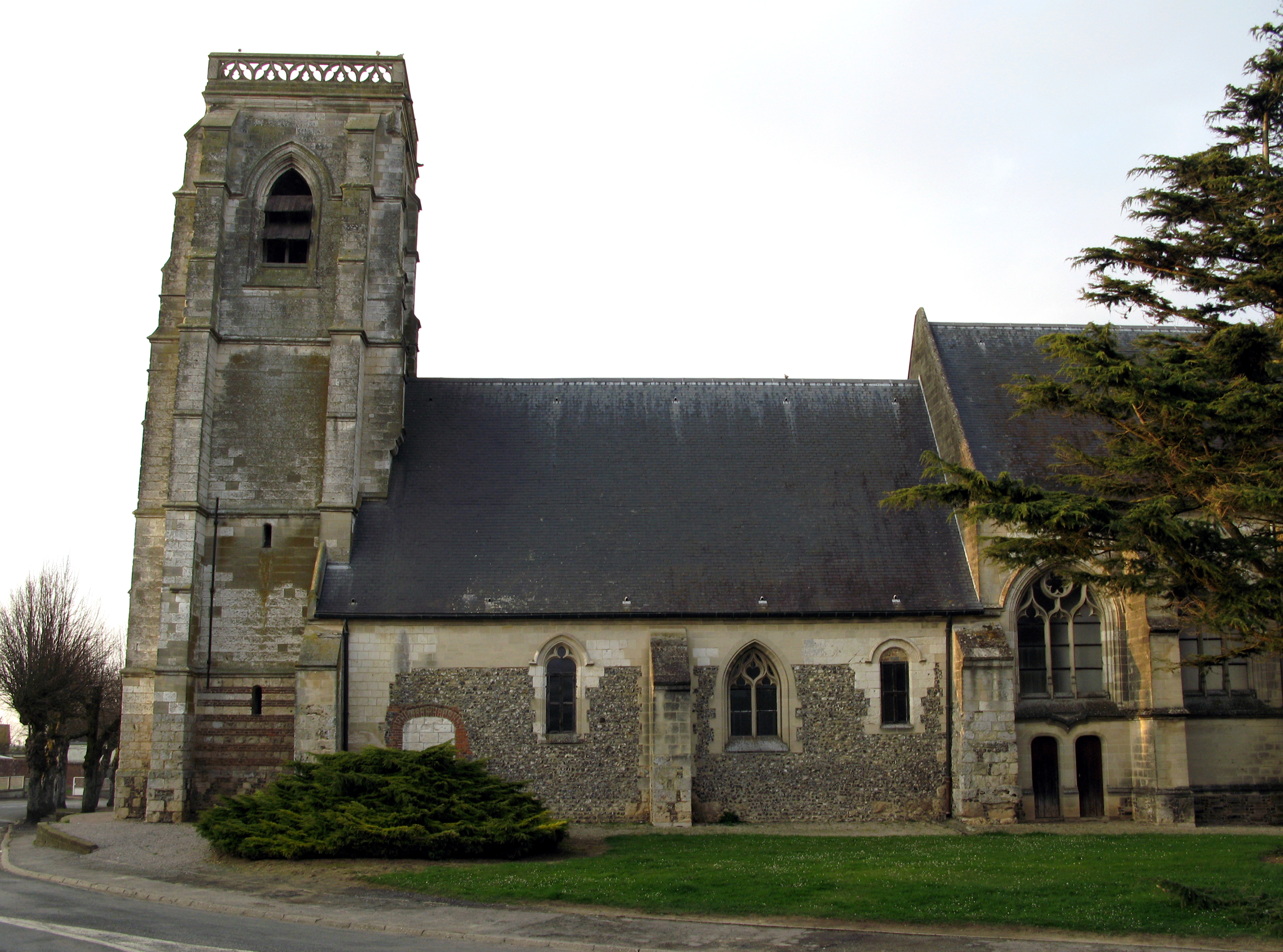
- The church in Moyenneville

- Coat of arms
- Location of Moyenneville
- Location within France Location within Hauts-de-France
- Coordinates: 50°04′22″N 1°45′02″E
- Country: France
- Region: Hauts-de-France
- Department: Somme
- Arrondissement: Abbeville
- Canton: Abbeville-2
- Intercommunality: CC Vimeu

Government
  - Mayor (2020–2026): Gérard Paraisot
- Area^{1}: 14.12 km^{2} (5.45 sq mi)
- Elevation: 114 m (374 ft)
- Highest elevation: 106 m (348 ft)
- Lowest elevation: 17 m (56 ft)
- Population (2023): 693
  - Density: 49.1/km^{2} (127/sq mi)
- Time zone: UTC+01:00 (CET)
  - Summer (DST): UTC+02:00 (CEST)
- INSEE/Postal code: 80578 /80870
- ^{1} French Land Register data, which excludes lakes, ponds, glaciers > 1 km^{2} (0.386 sq mi or 247 acres) and river estuaries.

Moyenneville (French pronunciation: [mwajɛnvil]; Picard: Moéyénneville) is a commune in the Somme department in Hauts-de-France in northern France.

== Geography ==
Moyenneville is situated at the D22 and D73 crossroads, some 5 miles (8 km) southwest of Abbeville.

== Population ==
Historical population
Year	Pop.	±% p.a.
1968	618	—
1975	603	−0.35%
1982	557	−1.13%
1990	565	+0.18%
1999	626	+1.15%
2007	661	+0.68%
2012	703	+1.24%
2017	716	+0.37%
2023	693	−0.54%
Source: INSEE

== See also ==
- Communes of the Somme department
