= 155th Street station (IND Eighth Avenue Line) =

New York City Subway station in Manhattan

155 Street
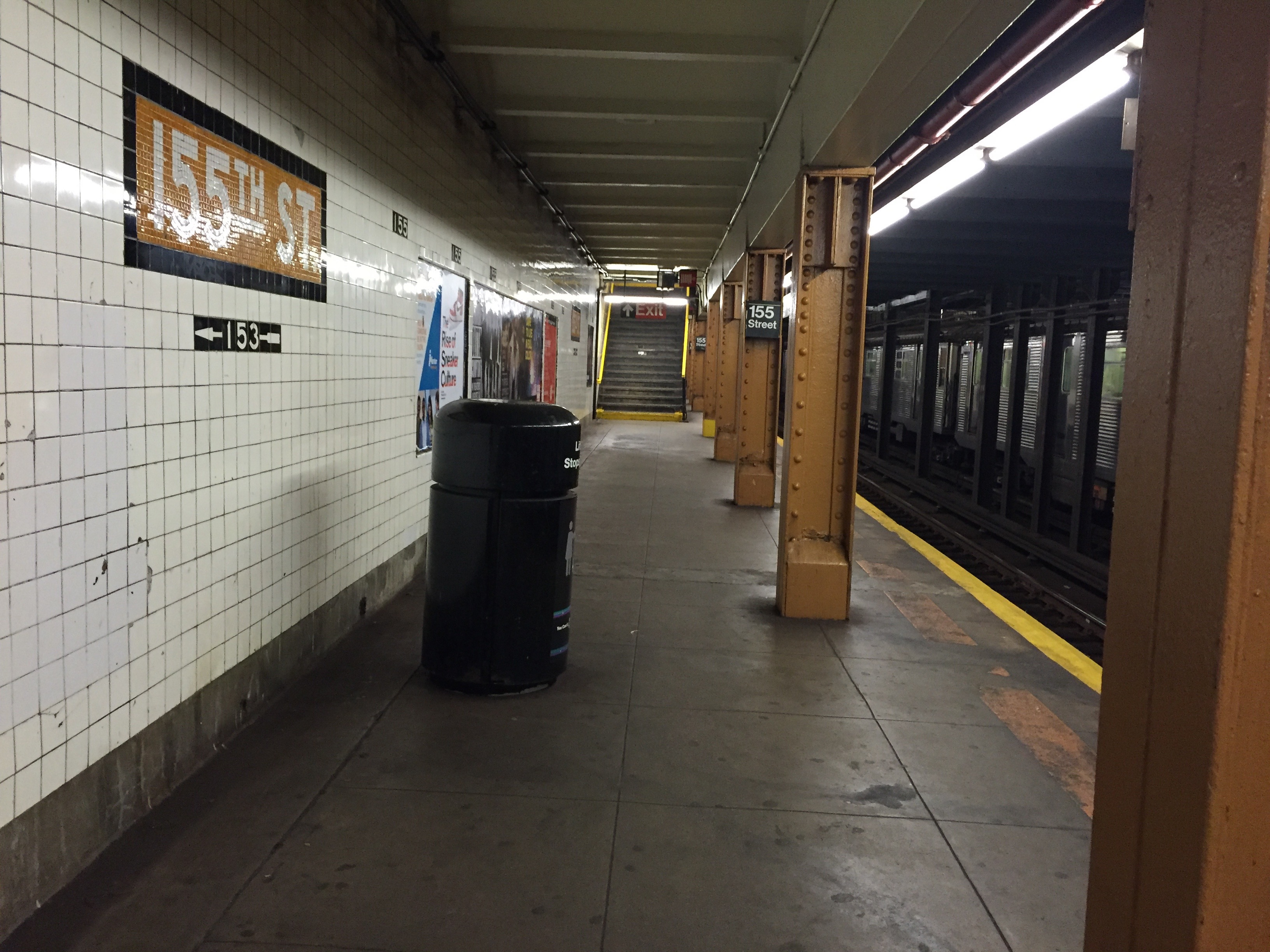
- Brooklyn bound platform

Station statistics
- Address: West 155th Street & St. Nicholas Avenue; New York, New York
- Borough: Manhattan
- Locale: Washington Heights, Hamilton Heights, Harlem
- Coordinates: 40.830859°N 73.9414°W
- Division: B (IND)
- Line: IND Eighth Avenue Line
- Services: A (late nights); C (all except late nights)
- Transit: NYCT Bus: Bx6, Bx6 SBS, M2, M3, M100, M101
- Structure: Underground
- Platforms: 2 side platforms
- Tracks: 2

Other information
- Opened: September 10, 1932 (94 years ago)
- Accessible: No; planned

Traffic
- 2025: 573,627 ▲1.7%
- Rank: 377 out of 423
Services
Preceding station	New York City Subway	Following station
163rd Street–Amsterdam Avenue A C toward 168th Street	Local	145th Street A C toward Euclid Avenue
Location
Location within New York City Subway
Location within New York City
Location within New York
Track layout
Street map
Station service legend
Symbol	Description
Stops all times except late nights	Stops all times except late nights
Stops late nights only	Stops late nights only

The 155th Street station is a local station on the IND Eighth Avenue Line of the New York City Subway. Located under the intersection of 155th Street and St. Nicholas Avenue, at the border of the Harlem and Washington Heights neighborhoods of Manhattan, it is served by the C train at all times except late nights, when the A train takes over service.

== History ==
The station opened on September 10, 1932, as part of the city-operated Independent Subway System (IND)'s initial segment, the Eighth Avenue Line between Chambers Street and 207th Street. Construction of the whole line cost $191.2 million (equivalent to $4,511.9 million in 2025). While the IRT Broadway–Seventh Avenue Line already provided parallel service, the new Eighth Avenue subway via Central Park West and Frederick Douglass Boulevard provided an alternative route. As part of its 2025–2029 Capital Program, the MTA has proposed making the station wheelchair-accessible in compliance with the Americans with Disabilities Act of 1990.

== Station layout ==
This underground station has two local tracks with two side platforms. The two express tracks, used by the A train during daytime hours, are on a lower level beneath the station and are not visible from the platforms.

The station once had a southern mezzanine with exits to 153rd Street, but it is now closed and used as a MTA New York City Transit facility. The north end at 155th Street has vent chambers and a high ceiling.

Like several other IND Eighth Avenue Line local stations, this station does not have a trim line, but does have mosaic name plates reading "155TH ST." in white sans-serif lettering on a yellow background with black border. Small tile captions reading "155" run along the wall at regular intervals between the name tablets, and beneath the name tablets are directional captions, all white lettering on a black background. The trim line was part of a color-coded tile system used throughout the IND. The tile colors were designed to facilitate navigation for travelers going away from Lower Manhattan. As such, the yellow tiles used at the 155th Street station were originally also used at 145th Street, the next express station to the south, while a different tile color is used at 168th Street, the next express station to the north. Yellow tiles are similarly used at the 163rd Street–Amsterdam Avenue station, the only other local station between 145th Street and 168th Street.

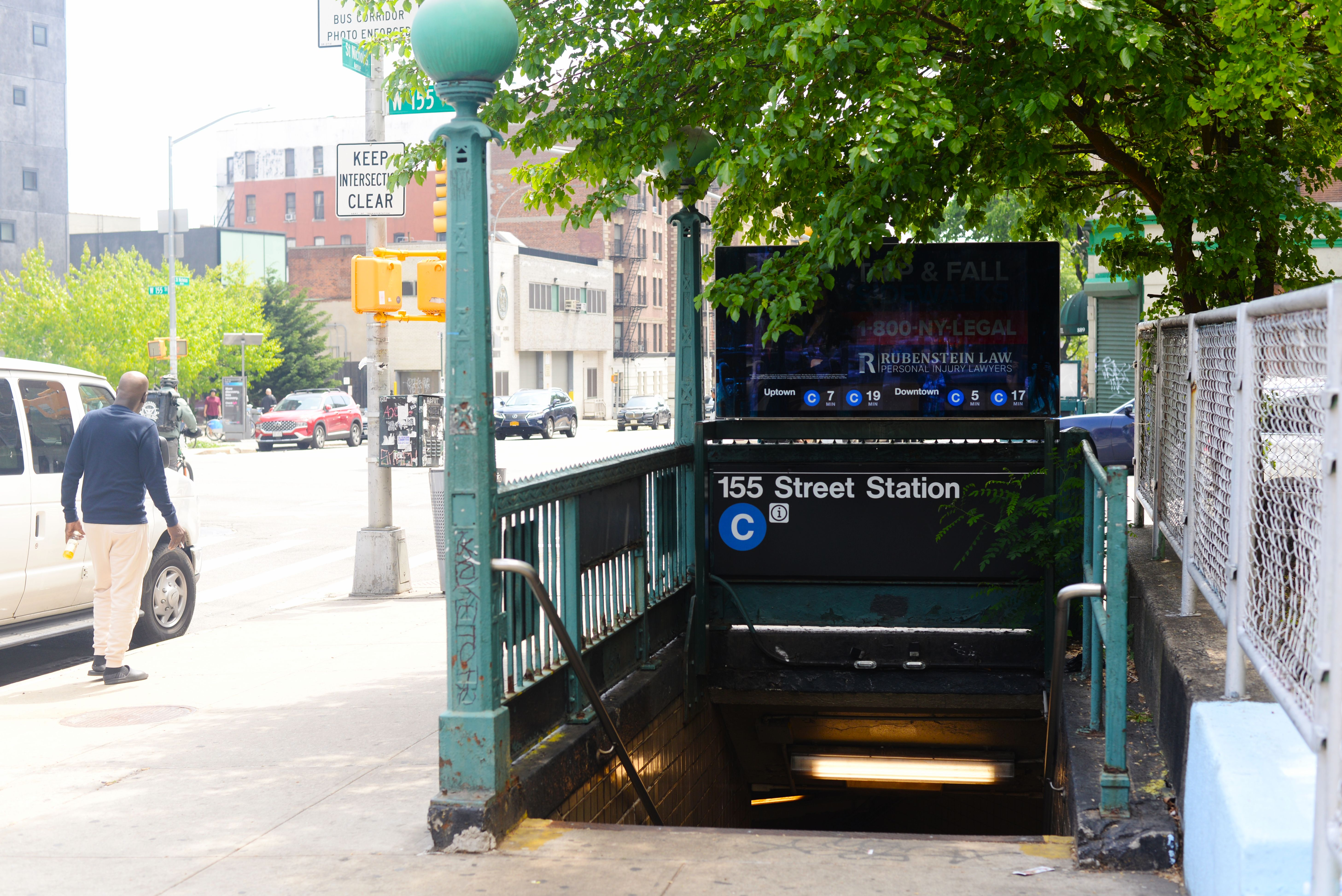
Entrance at the northwest corner of St. Nicholas and 155th St.

=== Exits ===
This station has pairs of staircases leading to the northwestern, northeastern, and southwestern corners of St. Nicholas Avenue and West 155th Street.
