= 155th Illinois Infantry Regiment =

155th Regiment Illinois Volunteer Infantry
- Illinois state flag
- Active: February 28, 1865, to September 4, 1865
- Country: United States
- Allegiance: Union
- Branch: Union Army
- Type: Infantry
- Role: Infantry
- Size: 904 Enlisted

The 155th Regiment Illinois Volunteer Infantry was an infantry regiment that served in the Union Army during the American Civil War.

== Service ==
The 155th Illinois Infantry was organized at Camp Butler, Illinois, and mustered into Federal service on February 28, 1865, for a one-year enlistment.

On March 2, the regiment, which had a strength of 904, moved to Tullahoma, Tennessee to report to General Milroy. On June 17, the regiment conducted garrison duty on the Nashville and & Chattanooga Railroad, with twenty to thirty-man detachments guarding from Nashville to the Duck River.

The regiment mustered out September 4, 1865.

== Total strength and casualties ==
The regiment suffered 71 enlisted men who died of disease for a total of 71 fatalities.

== Commanders ==
- Colonel Gustavus A. Smith - mustered out with the regiment.

== See also ==
- List of Illinois Civil War Units
- Illinois in the American Civil War
