= New York City Subway chaining =

Method to specify locations along the New York City Subway lines

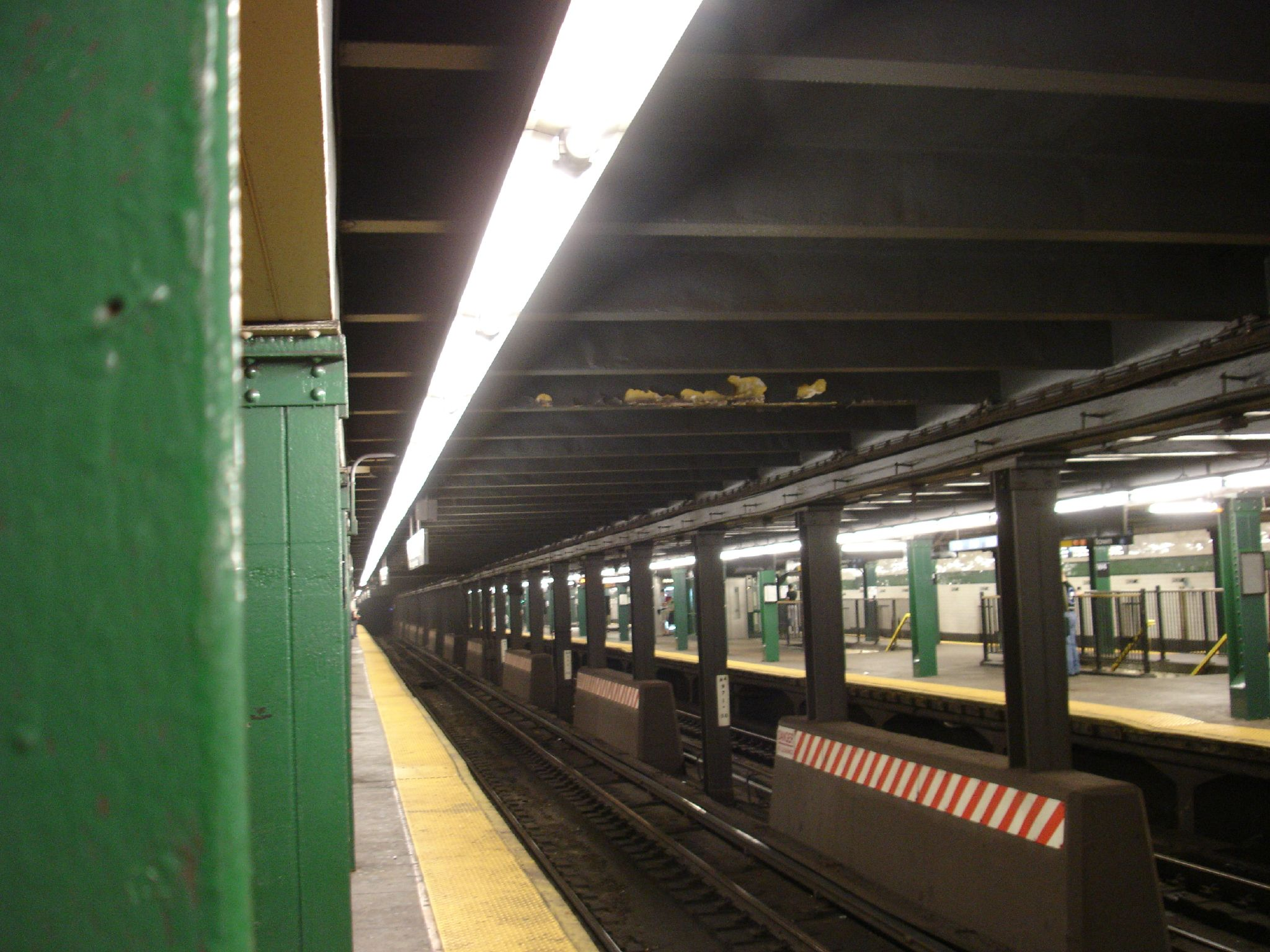
Chaining numbers can be seen on the black pillars in the middle of the tracks of West Fourth Street–Washington Square.

New York City Subway chaining is a method to precisely specify locations along the New York City Subway lines. It measures distances from a fixed point, called chaining zero, following the twists and turns of the railroad line, so that the distance described is understood to be the "railroad distance," not the distance by the most direct route ("as the crow flies").

The New York City Subway system differs from other railroad chaining systems in that it uses the engineer's chain of 100 feet (30.48 m) rather than the surveyor's chain of 66 feet (20.12 m).

== Terminology ==
=== Chaining zero ===
Chaining zero is a fixed point from which the chaining is measured on a particular chaining line. A chaining number of, for example, 243 at a specific line location (called a chaining station) identifies that the location is the length of 243 100-foot chains (24,300 feet or 4.60 miles or 7.41 kilometres) from chaining zero, usually measured along the center line of the railroad.

Once chaining is established, it is rare but not unheard of to change the location of chaining zero or the route along which it is measured on a given line. There are several examples of chaining numbers that refer to a chaining zero location that no longer exists or along a physical line that no longer exists, because of abandonment or demolition. Notable among these are several existing chaining lines that originated near New York City Hall via the Brooklyn Bridge, discontinued since 1944. It is occasionally possible for a reroute to alter the accuracy of chaining numbers slightly.

Exceptions exist to the principle that chaining numbers represent a railroad distance to the zero point. On the original IND chaining zero for the original system is a political rather than physical location, and there is no railroad at or near the zero point. Sometimes trackage (usually but not always short distances) is chained backwards from a tie point with another line.

The three divisions each had a separate mileage zero before the 1958 opening of the Far Rockaway–Mott Avenue station. The zeros were changed after the Far Rockaway station's opening, and are now at the railroad southernmost points of each division. The IND division-wide zero is at the Far Rockaway station's bumper blocks, the IRT zero (except the IRT Flushing Line) is a northbound home signal at the north end of New Lots Avenue station, and the BMT zero is in the center of Coney Island–Stillwell Avenue station. Since the IRT Flushing Line is operationally separate from the rest of the system, it uses a different zero from the rest of the IRT. The IRT Flushing Line's Mileage zero is at 34th Street–Hudson Yards, and before the 7 Subway Extension opened in 2015, the zero was at Times Square.

=== Chaining lines ===
Chaining lines are routes on physical railroad lines that are usually described by one or two letters for the purpose of identifying locations on those lines.

Chaining lines are not necessarily the same as the physical lines they run on. One physical line may have several chaining letters, and one chaining line may cover several physical lines.

The letters assigned to a chaining line have nothing to do with the letters displayed on trains, public maps and timetables. These letters are subway service letters. See: New York City Subway nomenclature and List of New York City Subway services.

For example, the BMT A chaining line begins at BMT South chaining zero north of 57th Street–Seventh Avenue on the BMT Broadway Line, but is interrupted north of the Canal Street stations, where the express tracks becomes BMT H for the trip over the Manhattan Bridge south side tracks and the local tracks become BMT B for Lower Manhattan and the Montague Street Tunnel. The BMT A line begins again in the middle of the Manhattan Bridge span on the north side tracks, passes through DeKalb Avenue and then becomes the BMT Brighton Line for that line's entire distance to Stillwell Avenue. BMT A originally traversed the entire north side of the bridge, connecting Canal to DeKalb, while H ran towards Chambers St. instead of Canal, but this was reconfigured as part of the Chrystie Street Connection. The IND B designation was extended past the portal of the new connection, to meet the BMT A in the middle, yet retained the BMT chaining numbers on the bridge itself. The tracks leading to Chambers St. were severed from the bridge and were re-designated as part of BMT J.

In a few cases, the chaining lines and service letters are coincident, such as the IND A chaining line following the A service from 207th Street to Euclid Avenue, while the IND C was the IND Concourse Line, which was originally served by the C service. However, that service was later moved off of the Concourse line, while the chaining code remains.

=== Chaining stations ===
Each specific location along a line is known as a chaining station, and is identified by a number unique to that chaining line. The precision of the location depends on its usage. On engineering maps, the location of such features as curves, switches, crossings, stations and platforms are ordinarily specified to a precision of 1 foot (30 cm). This is expressed as [chains plus feet]; a chaining station located 1,470 feet from chaining zero would be described as 14+70. For greater precision, or where style or protocol requires it, unit of less than a foot may be described. The Brooklyn Rapid Transit Company used [chains plus feet point hundredths] without trailing zeros: thus a map location designated as P.S. 14+70.25 would indicate that the Point of a Switch at that location is 1,470 and one quarter feet (1,470 feet and 3 inches) from chaining zero.

Signals are identified by the chaining line and track number, and by the nearest 100-foot chaining station. In this usage only the number of 100-foot chains from chaining zero are displayed. Thus, a signal on the BMT with a designation of A2 / 102 would be on the BMT chaining line A, track 2, within 50 feet of the chaining station at 10,200 feet from chaining zero.

== Track numbers on chaining lines ==
Each track on a chaining line is given a number, letter or (rarely) a combination of both to identify a particular track on a particular line.

=== BMT/IND practice ===
On the BMT and IND an odd numbered mainline track is going railroad south and an even numbered mainline track is going railroad north. In many locations a track may be going "railroad" north or south where the compass direction is different or even opposite. This may be because it is an essentially east–west line (e.g., the Jamaica Line), so railroad north means towards Manhattan and railroad south means away from Manhattan. It may also be because a line continuing from a north–south line turns in another direction (e.g., the IND Fulton Street Line) but the railroad direction remains the same.

These track numbers provide a definitive way of determining whether a particular direction on a particular line is going "railroad" north or south. Especially it shows that "south" on several lines (including the BMT Jamaica Line, the IND Fulton Street Line and the BMT Myrtle Avenue Line) that run in an easterly to northerly compass direction for their entire route are nevertheless running railroad south.

The local (usually outside) tracks on a given BMT/IND line are numbered 1 (south) and 2 (north). The express tracks are numbered 3 (south) and 4 (north). If there are an odd number of mainline tracks, the center track is (for example) track 3/4. The signals heading southbound will show the location as track 3 and northbound track 4. Additional tracks on the same chaining line are usually numbered higher by the same rules. On the four track BMT Brighton Line, the tracks from west to east are:

A1–A3–A4–A2

On the three track BMT West End Line, they are:

D1–D3/4–D2

On the two track BMT Canarsie Line, they are:

Q1–Q2

Some stations may have the same number of tracks, but a slightly different chaining. On most stations on the three-track IND Concourse Line, the chaining (from west to east) is:

C1–C3/4–C2

At Bedford Park Boulevard, the chaining is:

C1–C6–C2

=== IRT practice ===
On the IRT the signals are numbered differently. The track number for chaining purposes is added to the end of the survey number, so that the southbound signal numbers end in 4 (local) and 2 (express) and the northbounds are 1 (express) and 3 (local). On a four track line, the signal numbers end:

4–2–1–3

On a three track line, 1/2 are used signals on the middle track (1 is for signals governing northward moves, and 2 southward). 4 and 3 are still the local tracks:

4–1/2–3

And on a two-track line, there are no express tracks, so the two tracks are:

4–3

Strangely, IRT track designations differ from the signal chaining track numbers they are numbered from left to right (facing north), tracks number 1 through 4:

1–2–3–4

And on a three-track line:

1–M–4 or 2–M–3

Thus, a line will have signal numbers ending in "4–2–1–3" and tracks designated as "1–2–3–4".

Signals on the IRT governing in the opposite of the normal direction of travel will have a signal number ending N+4 from the signal numbers governing in the normal direction.

Examples of all four tracks at a particular survey location (on the signal plate, the "-" is a line break):

BMT:
B1-243 | B3-243 | B4-243 | B2-243

IRT:
2434-B | 2432-B | 2431-B | 2433-B

== Handling chaining junctions ==
When one line splits from or joins another, a decision must be made on how to measure the chaining distances on the individual lines. One way is to establish a new zero point for one or more lines, but this is inefficient. Typically a major end-point terminal will be chosen as chaining zero, and all lines that are tributary to that terminal will measure their chaining from that point. This process is called tying. For example, if one line ties to another at a certain point, and the chaining station number at that point is 135+10 (13,510 feet from chaining zero), then a location on either branch that is 1,000 feet from that will have a chaining station number of 145+10.

=== Tying ===
When a new line or branch separates from another line, and the new line "picks up" the chaining numbers of the original line, the new line is said to be "tied" at that point. For example, where the BMT Montague Street Tunnel Line (BMT B) separates from the Broadway Line (BMT A via the Manhattan Bridge) north of Canal Street and Broadway, we say that BMT B ties to BMT A at Canal and Broadway. That way (assuming BMT A ends at chaining zero, which it does) the distance from a chaining station on BMT B is measured by following the physical BMT B to its tying point, and then following the physical BMT A from there to chaining zero.

=== Reverse tying ===
Sometimes when a line leaves another line, the chaining on the branch line should be tied to the original line, but sometimes the chaining distances go down instead of up. This is almost always because the branch joins the main line coming from the same direction as the main line, and we want the chaining numbers of the branch to be derived from the main line, so as not to have to establish a separate chaining zero location for the branch. An example of this was the Fulton Ferry branch of the Fulton Street Elevated (BMT K) which split from the Brooklyn Bridge branch at a location called Kings County (KC) Junction. Chaining zero for both branches was at Park Row, over the Brooklyn Bridge. The stub end branch to Fulton Ferry (the original terminal) was chained backwards from Kings County Junction to the East River shoreline. The chaining numbers went from 0+00 (zero) at the western end of Park Row station to 77+20 (7,720 feet) at KC Junction. Then the Fulton Ferry branch was reverse tied at that point so that the chaining station at the ferry end of the line was 45+38 (4,538 feet). By this method, the distance from any point on the Fulton Street el to either terminal could be readily measured.

=== No tying ===
Sometimes two or more lines merge or abut but the chaining shouldn't be tied. For example, the Montague Street Tunnel Line BMT B is tied to Broadway Line BMT A at Canal Street, but BMT B returns to BMT A railroad south of the DeKalb Avenue station in Brooklyn. Since BMT B uses a longer route to reach the same location than BMT A does, the chaining numbers are different where the two lines rejoin. In this case, the BMT B chaining simply ends and the BMT A chaining is picked up again.

== Chaining codes ==
Following are tables describing the chaining lines of all three divisions, including defunct lines.

=== BMT ===
==== Current ====
Many of these lines originally had individual chaining zero points as a result of the different companies that built and operated them. The BRT consolidated the chaining system subsequent to taking over these and many lines were again rechained when they were shifted from elevated to subway lines. These chaining lines and zero locations are accurate as of c. 1900 for lines chained from Park Row; as they were opened c. 1915–1920 for lines chained from 57th Street; as of line openings for other lines. Where chaining has changed since these chaining lines were established, the current chaining is shown.

All Mileage zeroes are at Coney Island–Stillwell Avenue.

Chaining line	Physical line	North	South	Chaining zero	Mileage zero
A	Broadway Line / Brighton Line	57th Street–Seventh Avenue	Canal Street lower level	57th Street–Seventh Avenue	Coney Island–Stillwell Avenue
A	Broadway Line / Brighton Line	midpoint of Manhattan Bridge north tracks	Coney Island–Stillwell Avenue	57th Street–Seventh Avenue	Coney Island–Stillwell Avenue
B	Broadway Line / Montague Street Tunnel	Canal Street upper level (ties to BMT A)	junction with Brighton Line south of DeKalb Avenue	57th Street–Seventh Avenue	Coney Island–Stillwell Avenue
C	BMT Culver Line (no longer in revenue service) (Note: The BMT Culver line segment that has BMT chaining was never part of the IND Culver line)	Ninth Avenue lower level (ties to BMT D)	Fort Hamilton Parkway	57th Street–Seventh Avenue	Coney Island–Stillwell Avenue
D	West End Line	36th Street (ties to BMT F)	Coney Island–Stillwell Avenue	57th Street–Seventh Avenue	Coney Island–Stillwell Avenue
E	Sea Beach Line	59th Street (ties to BMT F)	Coney Island–Stillwell Avenue	57th Street–Seventh Avenue	Coney Island–Stillwell Avenue
F	Fourth Avenue Line	Gold Street Interlocking north of DeKalb Avenue (ties to BMT A)	Bay Ridge–95th Street	57th Street–Seventh Avenue	Coney Island–Stillwell Avenue
G (tracks 1 and 2)	Astoria Line / 60th Street Tunnel	Astoria–Ditmars Boulevard	57th Street–Seventh Avenue	57th Street–Seventh Avenue	Coney Island–Stillwell Avenue
G (tracks 3 and 4)	63rd Street Line	Lexington Avenue–63rd Street	57th Street–Seventh Avenue	57th Street–Seventh Avenue	Section opened after mileage system fell into disuse.
GD	60th Street Tunnel Connection	Queens Plaza	junction with BMT G (Tracks 1/2) west of Queensboro Plaza (ties to BMT G)	57th Street–Seventh Avenue	Coney Island–Stillwell Avenue
H	Manhattan Bridge south tracks	Canal Street lower level (ties to BMT A)	interlocking north of DeKalb Avenue	57th Street–Seventh Avenue	Coney Island–Stillwell Avenue
J	Nassau Street Line / Jamaica Line / Archer Avenue Line	Chambers Street	168th Street (demolished)	Chambers Street	Coney Island–Stillwell Avenue
J	Nassau Street Line / Jamaica Line / Archer Avenue Line	Chambers Street	Jamaica Center–Parsons/Archer	Chambers Street	Section opened after mileage system fell into disuse.
M	Myrtle Avenue Line	Sands Street (demolished) (tied to BMT K)	Broadway (abandoned)	Park Row (demolished)	Coney Island–Stillwell Avenue
M	Myrtle Avenue Line	Myrtle Avenue	Middle Village–Metropolitan Avenue	Park Row (demolished)	Coney Island–Stillwell Avenue
O	Franklin Avenue Line	Franklin Avenue/Fulton Street (ties to BMT K)	Prospect Park	Park Row (demolished)	Coney Island–Stillwell Avenue
P	Canarsie Line–Linden Shops	Livonia Avenue	Linden Shops	between Atlantic Avenue and Sutter Avenue	Coney Island–Stillwell Avenue
Q	Canarsie Line	Eighth Avenue	Canarsie–Rockaway Parkway	Eighth Avenue	Coney Island–Stillwell Avenue
R	Nassau Street Line	Chambers Street	Montague Street Tunnel (reverse-ties to BMT B)	57th Street–Seventh Avenue	Coney Island–Stillwell Avenue

==== Former ====
Chaining line	Physical line	North	South	Chaining zero
K	Fulton Street Line (remaining portion transferred to IND)	Fulton Ferry (demolished) (reverse-tied to main BMT K)	Kings County Junction	Park Row (demolished)
K	Fulton Street Line (remaining portion transferred to IND)	Park Row (demolished)	Ozone Park–Lefferts Boulevard	Park Row (demolished)
L	Lexington Avenue Line (demolished)	Grand Street/Myrtle Avenue (demolished) (tied to BMT M)	Broadway	Park Row (demolished)
N	Fifth Avenue Line (demolished)	Myrtle Avenue/Hudson Street (tied to BMT M)	65th Street/Third Avenue (demolished)	Park Row (demolished)

- BMT C: Original BMT C ran along the entire length of the Culver Line, from the lower level of Ninth Avenue over to Ditmas Avenue (elevated over the right-of-way of the South Brooklyn Railway), then along the McDonald Avenue El to West Eighth Street–New York Aquarium, where BMT A (Brighton Line) chaining took over. With the opening of the Culver Ramp, the IND acquired the Culver Line from Ditmas Avenue south and rechained it as part of IND B (from 57th Street/Sixth Avenue to West Eighth Street). The surviving portion of the northern Culver Line, which today runs from Ninth Avenue lower level to about Fort Hamilton Parkway and 37th Street, is still chained BMT C.
- BMT G: Tracks 3 and 4, which constitute the BMT 63rd Street Line, are not to be confused with track G3-4, the single express track on the Astoria Line. Positions on the 63rd Street Line have approximately 100+00 added to the actual distance from the zero point.
- BMT K: The Fulton Ferry spur was chained from Park Row to Kings County Junction (located east of former Sands Street station), then backwards from the junction to Fulton Ferry.
- BMT L: Lexington Avenue Line chaining ended at the intersection of Lexington Avenue and Broadway, where the Lexington Avenue Line merged with the Broadway–Brooklyn Line (between Kosciuszko Street and Gates Avenue stations).
- BMT P: Until recently, BMT P consisted of the Canarsie Line from Broadway Junction to Canarsie–Rockaway Parkway. The entire Canarsie Line has since been rechained as BMT Q; the only remaining P chaining is the yard lead that diverges from the main line just south of Livonia Avenue and leads to Linden Shops.
- BMT Q: Originally, chaining for BMT Q began at Sixth Avenue—the original northern terminal of the 14th Street subway—and continued south to Broadway Junction. South of Broadway Junction, the line was chained as BMT P with chaining zero at the intersection of Pitkin and Van Sinderen Avenues, where the Canarsie Line had diverged from the former Fulton Street Line. When the 14th Street subway was extended to Eighth Avenue, the new trackage was chained as BMT QW, with chaining starting at Sixth and increasing to Eighth. The Canarsie Line has since been entirely rechained as Q, running from the zero at Eighth Avenue south to Rockaway Parkway.
- BMT Y: This is used on yard leads.

=== IND ===
==== Current ====
All Mileage zeroes are at Far Rockaway–Mott Avenue.

Chaining line	Physical line	North	South	Chaining zero	Mileage zero
A	Eighth Avenue Line / Fulton Street Line	Inwood–207th Street (ties and reverse-ties at West Fourth Street–Washington Square)	stub tracks past Euclid Avenue	IND zero	Far Rockaway–Mott Avenue
B	Sixth Avenue Lines / Culver Line	57th Street	midpoint of Manhattan Bridge north tracks	IND zero	57th Street and Chrystie Street sections opened after mileage system fell into disuse.
B	Sixth Avenue Lines / Culver Line	South of Columbus Circle	midpoint of Manhattan Bridge north tracks	IND zero	57th Street and Chrystie Street sections opened after mileage system fell into disuse.
B	Sixth Avenue Lines / Culver Line	West of Fifth Avenue/53rd Street	West Eighth Street–New York Aquarium (ties and reverse-ties to IND A at Jay Street–MetroTech)	IND zero	Far Rockaway–Mott Avenue
BJ	Chrystie Street Cut	Broadway–Lafayette Street (reverse ties to IND B)	Essex Street	IND zero	Section opened after mileage system fell into disuse.
C	Concourse Line	Norwood–205th Street	135th Street (ties to IND A)	IND zero	Far Rockaway–Mott Avenue
D	Queens Boulevard Line	Jamaica–179th Street	interlocking between 50th Street and 42nd Street–Port Authority Bus Terminal (ties to IND A)	IND zero	Far Rockaway–Mott Avenue
DA	Archer Avenue Line	Jamaica Center–Parsons/Archer	Briarwood (ties to IND D)	IND zero	Section opened after mileage system fell into disuse.
E	Brooklyn–Queens Crosstown Line	Queens Plaza (reverse-ties to IND D)	Fulton Street	IND zero	Far Rockaway–Mott Avenue
E	Brooklyn–Queens Crosstown Line	Fulton Street	Bergen Street (ties and reverse-ties to IND A at Hoyt Street.)	IND zero	Far Rockaway–Mott Avenue
F	Rockaway Line / Rockaway Park Branch	Rockaway Boulevard	Rockaway Park–Beach 116th Street	Long Island City (LIRR station)	Far Rockaway–Mott Avenue
FA	Far Rockaway Branch (Rockaway Line)	Hammels Wye (ties to IND F)	Far Rockaway–Mott Avenue	Long Island City (LIRR station)	Far Rockaway–Mott Avenue
K	Liberty Avenue El	east of Euclid Avenue	Ozone Park–Lefferts Boulevard	Park Row (demolished)	Far Rockaway–Mott Avenue
S	Second Avenue Line	96th Street	east of Lexington Avenue–63rd Street (ties to IND T)	IND zero	Sections opened after mileage system fell into disuse.
T	63rd Street Line	junction south of 36th Street	57th Street (ties to IND B)	IND zero	Sections opened after mileage system fell into disuse.

==== Former ====
Chaining line	Physical line	North	South	Chaining zero
D (tracks 5 and 6)	World's Fair Line (demolished)	World's Fair station	Forest Hills–71st Avenue (tied to IND D)	Jamaica Yard

- IND zero: The zero point of the IND system was determined by extending the centerline of West Fourth Street–Washington Square station south to the New York/New Jersey border. The point of intersection—located in Lower New York Bay just north of Keansburg, New Jersey—was calculated to be 96,925 feet (18.357 statute mi or 29.542 km) from the south ends of the Eighth Avenue Line platforms at West Fourth Street; this point became chaining point 969+25. Chaining distances then increase railroad north of West Fourth and decrease railroad south. As a result, the principle that chaining stations along any line reflect the accurate distance to a chaining zero point via the physical railroad is not true on the original IND.
- IND D (tracks 5 and 6): While the yard leads from the Forest Hills–71 Avenue station are tied to IND D, the chaining of Jamaica Yard and the World's Fair Line are not.
- IND E: From Bergen Street to Fulton Street, the line is tied to IND A, which it shares with the Hoyt–Schermerhorn Streets station. North of Fulton Street, the line is reverse-tied to IND D.
- IND F/FA: The Rockaway Line was originally part of the Long Island Rail Road and was chained from Long Island City station in Long Island City, Queens, via the old Montauk Line. When the IND acquired the Rockaway Line south of Liberty Avenue in 1956, it preserved the LIRR chaining distances. The single-track connection between the east and west legs of Hammels Wye has its own chaining, which starts at the point it branches from the east leg.
- IND K: The Liberty Avenue Elevated, currently part of the IND Fulton Street Line, was originally the eastern portion of the BMT Fulton Street Line, which had its chaining zero at Park Row. When the IND acquired the Liberty Avenue structure, it preserved the BMT chaining letter and zero point, reverse-tying the chaining back to Euclid Avenue.
- IND S: Ties to IND T near 2nd Avenue and 63rd Street, where the two lines intersect.

=== IRT ===
==== Current ====
All Mileage zeroes are at New Lots Avenue, except for the IRT Flushing Line, whose zero is Times Square.

Chaining line	Physical line	North	South	Chaining zero	Mileage zero
B	Broadway–Seventh Avenue Line	96th Street	Times Square–42nd Street (ties to IRT MM)	Brooklyn Bridge–City Hall	New Lots Avenue
BB	Broadway–Seventh Avenue Line	Van Cortlandt Park–242nd Street	96th Street		New Lots Avenue
C	Flushing Line	Flushing–Main Street	Times Square	Times Square	Times Square
CC	Flushing Line	Times Square	34th Street–Hudson Yards	Times Square	Section opened after mileage system fell into disuse.
D	Nostrand Avenue Line	Franklin Avenue (ties to IRT E)	Flatbush Avenue–Brooklyn College	Brooklyn Bridge–City Hall	New Lots Avenue
E	Eastern Parkway Line / New Lots Line	Borough Hall (ties to IRT M)	New Lots Avenue	Brooklyn Bridge–City Hall	New Lots Avenue
F	Lenox Avenue Line / White Plains Road Line	180th Street–Bronx Park (demolished)	96th Street		New Lots Avenue
J	Jerome Avenue Line	Woodlawn	125th Street/Lexington Avenue (ties to IRT L)	Park Avenue/38th Street	New Lots Avenue
K	Broadway–Seventh Avenue Line / Clark Street Tunnel	Chambers Street (ties to IRT V)	Borough Hall	Broadway/44th Street	New Lots Avenue
L	Lexington Avenue Line	125th Street/Lexington Avenue	Grand Central–42nd Street	Park Avenue/38th Street	New Lots Avenue
M	Lexington Avenue Line / Joralemon Street Tunnel	Brooklyn Bridge–City Hall	Borough Hall	Brooklyn Bridge–City Hall	New Lots Avenue
MM	42nd Street Shuttle / Lexington Avenue Line	Times Square	Brooklyn Bridge–City Hall	Brooklyn Bridge–City Hall	New Lots Avenue
MV	South Ferry loops	Bowling Green			New Lots Avenue
P	Pelham Line	Pelham Bay Park	125th Street/Lexington Avenue (ties to IRT L)	Park Avenue/38th Street	New Lots Avenue
V	Broadway–Seventh Avenue Line	Times Square–42nd Street	north of South Ferry loops	Broadway/44th Street	New Lots Avenue
VA	Broadway–Seventh Avenue Line	south of Rector Street (ties to IRT V)	South Ferry (new station)	Broadway/44th Street	Section opened after mileage system fell into disuse.
W	White Plains Road Line	Wakefield–241st Street	West Farms Square–East Tremont Avenue (ties to IRT F)	96th Street	New Lots Avenue
Y	Dyre Avenue Line	Eastchester–Dyre Avenue	East 180th Street (ties to IRT W)	96th Street	New Lots Avenue

==== Former ====
Chaining line	Physical line	North	South	Chaining zero
G	Bergen Cutoff (demolished) (from White Plains Road Line to Third Avenue Line)	Jackson Avenue	143rd Street/Third Avenue upper level (demolished) (tied to IRT T)	South Ferry elevated station (demolished)
H	Third Avenue Line over Webster Avenue (before 1955 resignalling project)	Gun Hill Road lower level (demolished)	Fordham Road (tied to IRT T)	South Ferry elevated station (demolished)
N	Ninth Avenue Line (demolished)	155th Street	South Ferry elevated station (demolished)	South Ferry elevated station (demolished)
Q	Queensboro Bridge (tracks removed)	57th Street/Second Avenue (tied to IRT S)	Queensboro Plaza	South Ferry elevated station (demolished)
R	162nd Street Connection (from Jerome Avenue Line to Ninth Avenue Line, demolished)	River Avenue/162nd Street	Putnam Bridge	U.S. Bulk Head Line on east shore of the Harlem River
S	Second Avenue Line (demolished)	129th Street	South Ferry elevated station (demolished)	South Ferry elevated station (demolished)
T	Third Avenue Line (demolished)	Bronx Park Terminal	South Ferry elevated station (demolished)	South Ferry elevated station (demolished)
T	Third Avenue Line over Webster Avenue (after 1955 resignalling project)	Gun Hill Road lower level	Fordham Road	South Ferry elevated station (demolished)
Z	Sixth Avenue Line (demolished)	53rd Street/Ninth Avenue	Rector Street (tied to IRT N)	South Ferry elevated station (demolished)
ZA	Sixth Avenue Line (demolished)	59th Street/Sixth Avenue	53rd Street/Sixth Avenue	South Ferry elevated station (demolished)

- IRT A: This was the original IRT designation of the Astoria Line until it was completely transferred to BMT operations.
- IRT Y: This chaining letter was formerly assigned to the portion of the Flushing Line from Times Square to Queensboro Plaza; this segment was later rechained as part of IRT C. Today, IRT Y constitutes the Dyre Avenue Line from Eastchester–Dyre Avenue south to East 180th Street. The Dyre Avenue Line had originally been part of the New York, Westchester and Boston Railway, which had had its chaining zero at its southern terminus at Oak Point Yard in the South Bronx. IRT Y has since been tied to IRT W under a new signal contract.
- Broadway/44th Street: The point where the Dual Contracts section of the Broadway–Seventh Avenue Line (from Times Square–42nd Street south) meets the Contract I section (north of 42nd Street).
- Park Avenue/38th Street: The point where the Dual Contracts section of the Lexington Avenue Line (from Grand Central–42nd Street north) meets the Contract I section (south of 42nd Street).
