= Montague Street Tunnel =

Tunnel under the East River in New York City

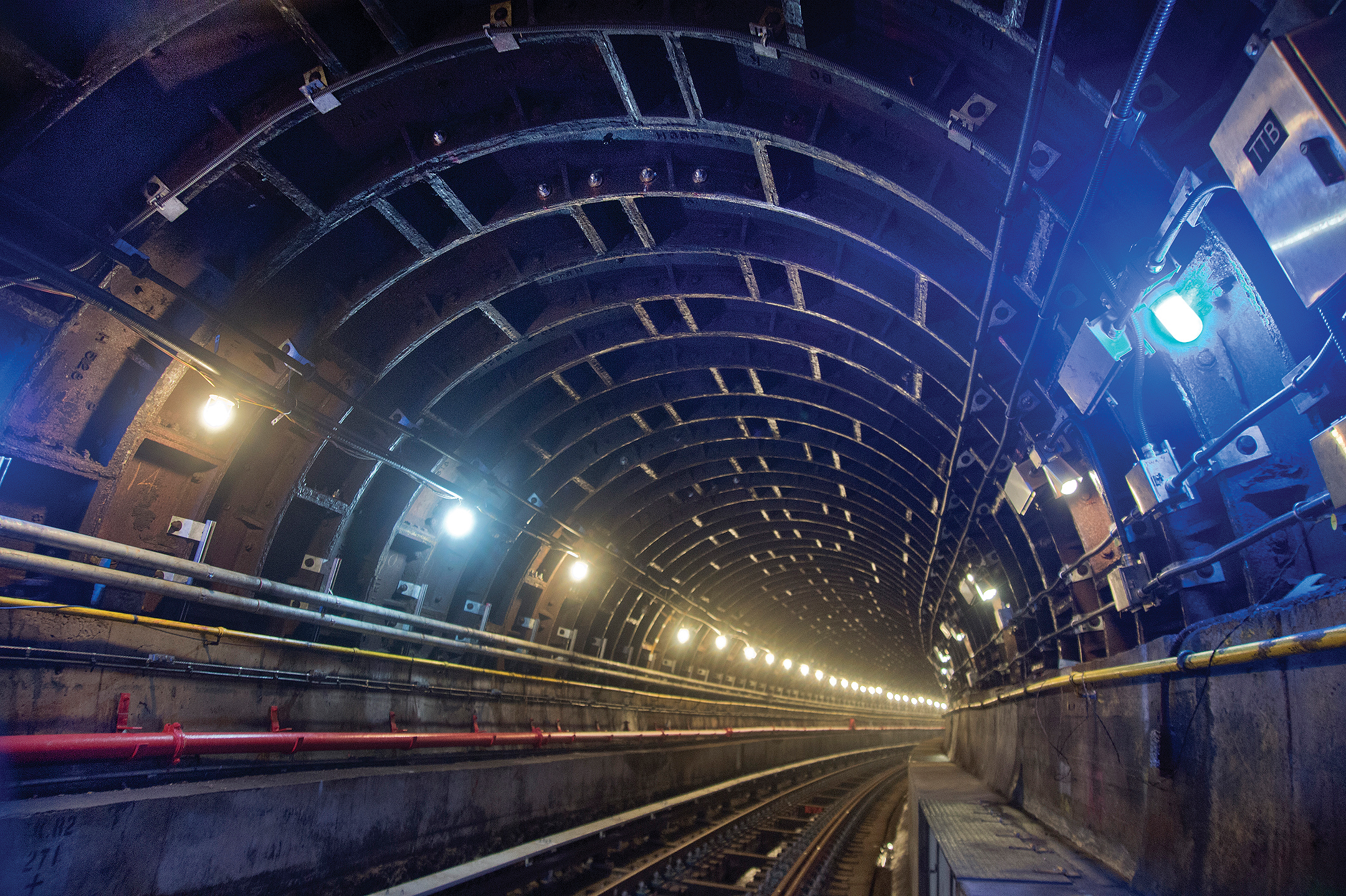

Overview
- Line: BMT Fourth Avenue Line (N, R, and W trains)
- Location: East River between Manhattan, New York and Brooklyn, New York
- Coordinates: 40°41′53″N 74°00′20″W
- System: New York City Subway

Operation
- Opened: August 1, 1920; 106 years ago
- Closed: August 2, 2013; 13 years ago (for reconstruction)
- Reopened: September 15, 2014; 12 years ago
- Operator: Metropolitan Transportation Authority

Technical
- No. of tracks: 2 tracks

The Montague Street Tunnel (/ˈmɒntəɡuː/) is a rail tunnel of the New York City Subway under the East River between the boroughs of Manhattan and Brooklyn, connecting the BMT Broadway Line and BMT Nassau Street Line with the BMT Fourth Avenue Line. The R train uses the tunnel at all times, the N train uses it during late nights, and several W trains in each direction also use the tunnel during rush hours. All of these services use the Broadway Line; the tunnel's connection with the Nassau Street Line has not been used in service since 2010.

The tunnel was constructed as part of the Dual Contracts expansion of the subway system, and opened in 1920. After being heavily damaged by flooding caused by Hurricane Sandy in 2012, it was closed full-time from 2013 to 2014 to be reconstructed.

== History ==
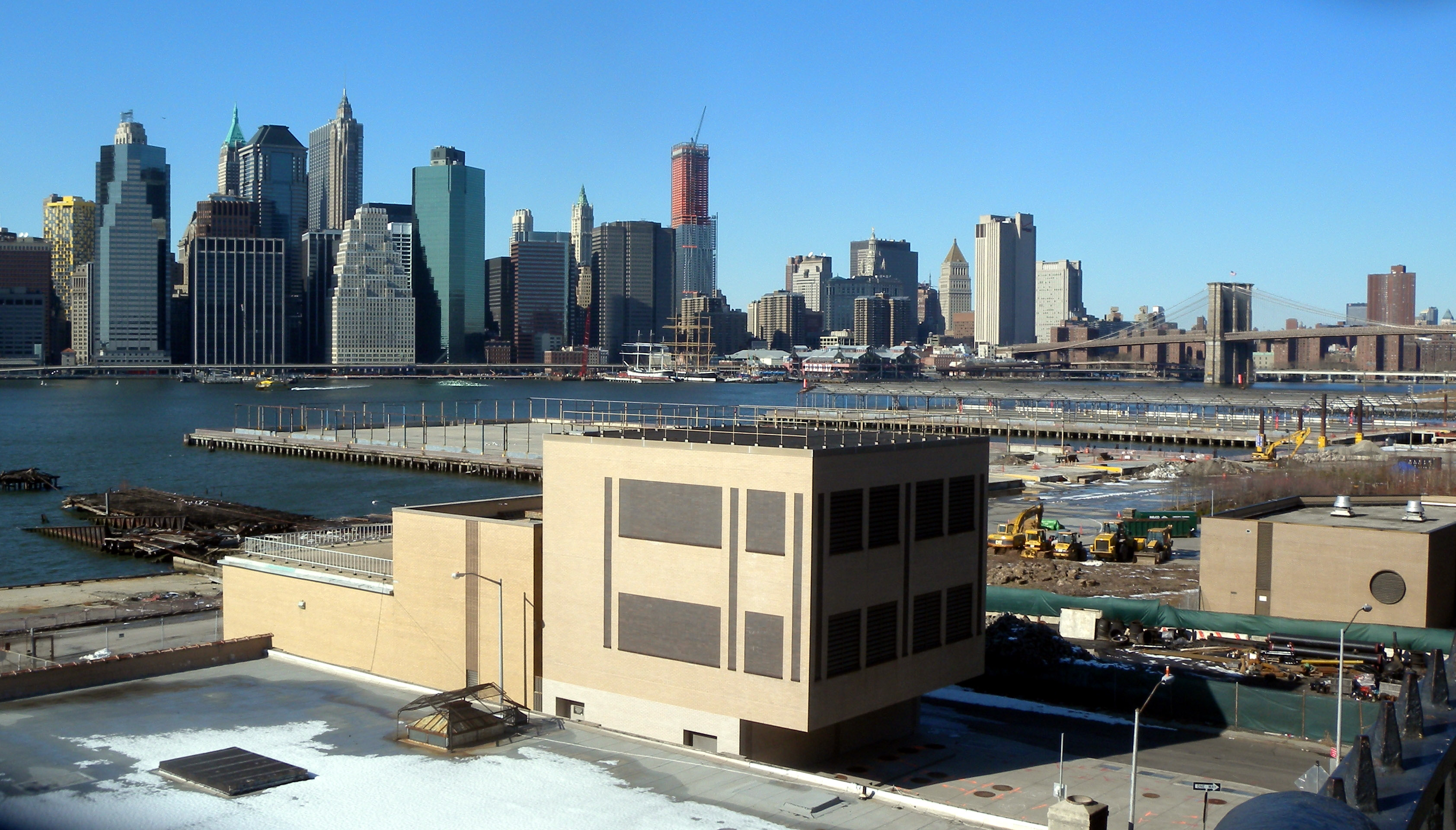
Brooklyn ventilation building

Construction of the tunnel began on October 12, 1914, using a tunneling shield in conjunction with compressed air. The tunnel was designed by civil engineer Clifford Milburn Holland, who would later serve as the first chief engineer of the Holland Tunnel. The north tube of the tunnel was holed through on June 2, 1917, and the south tube was holed through on June 20, 1917.

It opened to revenue service on August 1, 1920, the same day as the 60th Street Tunnel, on a holiday schedule; regular service began the next day. The two new tunnels allowed passengers to make an 18-mile (29 km) trip from Coney Island, through Manhattan on the BMT Broadway Line, to Queens for a five-cent fare. The original construction cost was $9,867,906.52, almost twice that of the 60th Street Tunnel.

On December 27, 1920, more than ten thousand passengers were forced to evacuate the tunnel. Power to the third rail was shut off after a shoe beam on a train approaching Whitehall Street fell and caused a short circuit, stranding ten subway trains inside the tunnel. In late 1960, the New York City Transit Authority voted to allot $300,000 for upgrades to the Montague Street Tunnel's ventilation shafts.

On October 29, 2012, the tunnel suffered severe flooding from Hurricane Sandy and as a result, was closed to train service while repairs were being made. Service in the tunnel was restored using temporary equipment on December 21. However, the MTA later announced that a complete reconstruction of the tunnel systems was needed, so the tunnel was closed for a second time around-the-clock on August 2, 2013. Originally slated to open by October 15, 2014, it reopened a month early on September 15, 2014.

== Constraints ==
Use of the Montague Street Tunnel, the Cranberry Street Tunnel, or a combination of the two tunnels were considered as alternatives in lieu of constructing a new tunnel under the East River for the proposed Lower Manhattan – Jamaica/JFK Transportation Project. Use of the existing tunnel was considered as an option because the Montague Street Tunnel had surplus capacity, having carried the M train until its reroute from the BMT Nassau Street Line to the IND Sixth Avenue Line in 2010, and the N train during the reconstruction of the Manhattan Bridge from 1986 until 2004.
