= Lower Manhattan–Jamaica/JFK Transportation Project =

Unbuilt rail project in New York City

The Lower Manhattan–Jamaica/JFK Transportation Project was a proposed public works project in New York City, New York, that would use the Long Island Rail Road's Atlantic Branch and a new tunnel under the East River to connect a new train station near or at the World Trade Center Transportation Hub site with John F. Kennedy International Airport and Jamaica station on the LIRR. It would allow for a one-seat, 36-minute-long ride between JFK Airport and Lower Manhattan, cut commuting times from Long Island by up to 40% and reduce crowding on the IRT Broadway–Seventh Avenue Line (2 and 3 trains), IRT Lexington Avenue Line (4 and 5 trains), IND Eighth Avenue Line (A and C trains), and BMT Broadway Line (N, R, and W trains) in Manhattan.

The Lower Manhattan–Jamaica/JFK Transportation Project was a priority of former New York Governor George Pataki. His successor, former Governor Eliot Spitzer, said that he did not view the project as a top priority, compared to construction of the Second Avenue Subway, LIRR East Side Access, or replacement of the Tappan Zee Bridge, and wanted a careful evaluation of the benefits of the costly project.

== Context ==
Before the September 11 attacks, Lower Manhattan was the third largest central business district in the United States. As of 2007, it was the fourth largest, behind Midtown Manhattan, Chicago, and Washington, D.C. Many commuters take the LIRR to Atlantic Terminal and transfer to a Manhattan-bound subway or take the LIRR to Penn Station and transfer to a subway heading downtown to reach their jobs in Lower Manhattan, both of which options consume a considerable amount of time.

For years there were proposals to extend the LIRR Atlantic Branch to Lower Manhattan, but none came to pass. The proposal again came to light during efforts to rebuild the transportation system of Lower Manhattan following the September 11 attacks, as the proposed rail link would assist in the economic recovery of the downtown area and also serve the increased population of residents and employees resulting from the late 20th century boom in the construction of offices and apartments, in hopes of providing future sustainability and abating automotive traffic.

== Proposed routes ==
In 1999, the Regional Plan Association considered a full-length Second Avenue Subway from Broad Street to 125th Street, along with the LIRR East Side Access, the extension of subway services along commuter rail lines in Brooklyn, Queens, and the Bronx, and an extension of New York City Subway service directly to JFK Airport via the AirTrain JFK. The new set of extensions proposed by the RPA, dubbed "MetroLink", consisted of 31 new metro stations, 3 recycled commuter rail stations, and 19 new route miles of track. A subway service would have started at Grand Central–42nd Street, gone down the IND Second Avenue Line and to Brooklyn via the Montague Street Tunnel, used the LIRR Atlantic Branch from Atlantic Terminal to Jamaica Station, and then used the AirTrain JFK's trackage to JFK Airport.

In 2004, a feasibility study was completed by the Metropolitan Transportation Authority (MTA), Port Authority of New York and New Jersey, Lower Manhattan Development Corporation, and New York City Economic Development Corporation to evaluate options for potential routes. At Jamaica Station, a 1,500-foot (460 m) long elevated structure would be built to connect the AirTrain to the existing LIRR Atlantic Branch; a new tunnel would be required between the Atlantic Terminal in Brooklyn and the World Trade Center in Lower Manhattan. The feasibility study considered four options to cross the East River:

- Using a new tunnel, which would cost approximately $4 billion to construct.
- Using the existing Cranberry Street Tunnel (IND), which is already operating at full capacity and would require rerouting A and C trains to the Rutgers Street Tunnel.
- Using the existing Montague Street Tunnel (BMT), which has spare capacity.
- Using a combination of the existing Cranberry Street Tunnel and Montague Street Tunnel, with one tunnel used by the LIRR and the other tunnel used by the AirTrain.

The feasibility study recommended constructing a new tunnel under the East River, and estimated that as many as 100,000 LIRR commuters and 4,000 to 6,000 AirTrain riders would use the new rail link on an average weekday.

== Funding ==
In June 2004, Governor Pataki proposed using unused federal funds aimed at rebuilding Lower Manhattan for the rail link, of which $2 billion was approved by the Bush administration the following month. The Senate Finance Committee eventually approved the use of the funds in 2007, but Pataki struggled to secure additional funding for the rail link before he left office, as it was competing against other projects such as the Mass Transit Tunnel for funding from the Port Authority and the Second Avenue Subway for funding from the MTA. Governors Eliot Spitzer and David Paterson did not make the project a priority, and approval of the $2 billion earmarked for the project has been blocked in the U.S. Senate. Meanwhile, the projected total cost for the project has risen from $6 billion to between $8.6 and $9.9 billion.

== See also ==
- 7 Subway Extension
- East Side Access
- Fulton Center
- Second Avenue Subway
