= High Street station (IND Eighth Avenue Line) =

New York City Subway station in Brooklyn

High Street
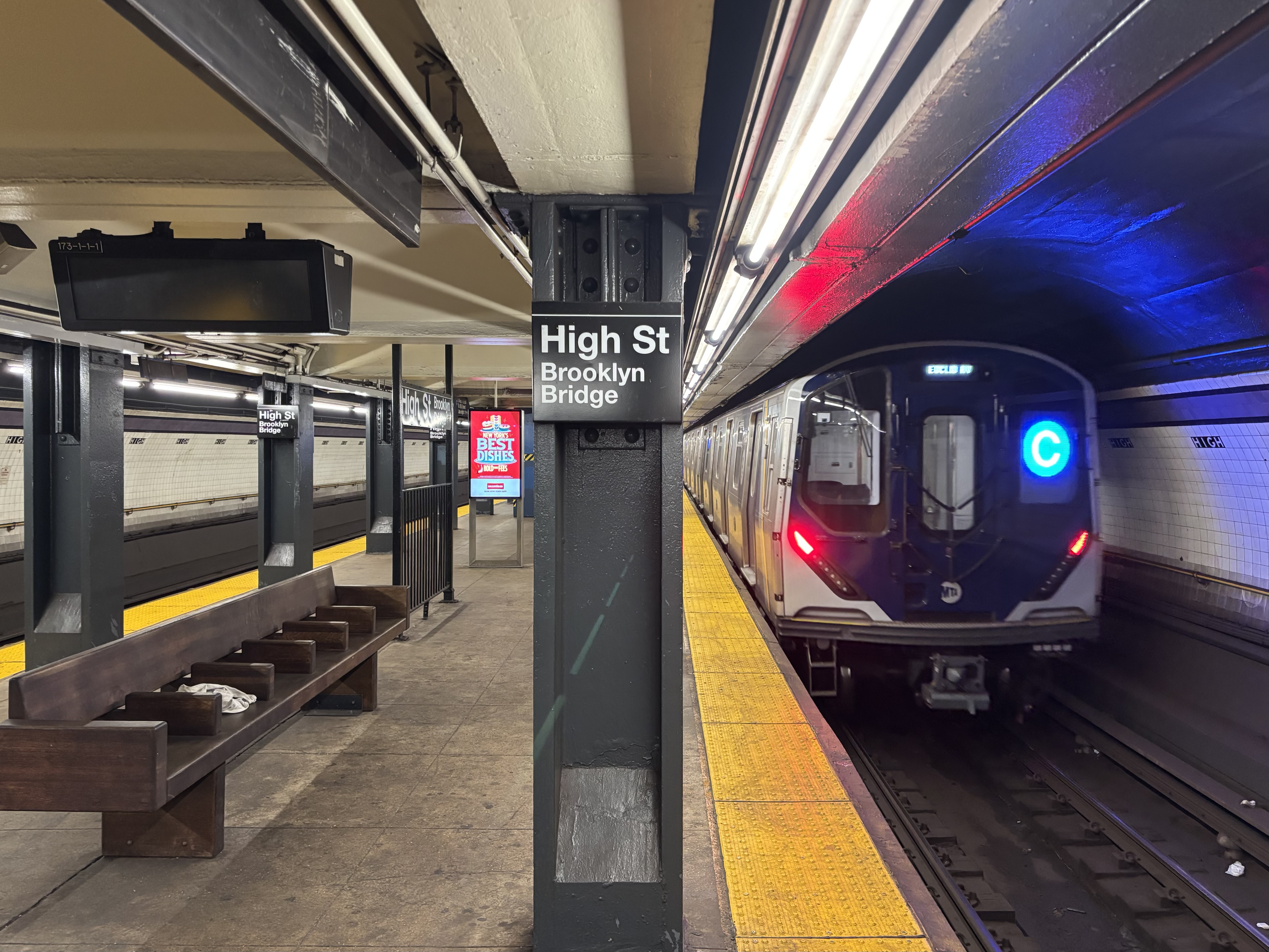
- Southbound R211A C train departing

Station statistics
- Address: High Street & Cadman Plaza East; Brooklyn, New York
- Borough: Brooklyn
- Locale: Brooklyn Heights, DUMBO, Downtown Brooklyn
- Coordinates: 40°41′56″N 73°59′23″W
- Division: B (IND)
- Line: IND Eighth Avenue Line
- Services: A (all times); C (all except late nights)
- Transit: NYCT Bus: B25; NYC Ferry: East River, South Brooklyn (at BBP Pier 1)
- Structure: Underground
- Platforms: 1 island platform
- Tracks: 2

Other information
- Opened: June 24, 1933; 93 years ago
- Former/other names: High Street–Brooklyn Bridge, Brooklyn Bridge Plaza, Cranberry Street

Traffic
- 2025: 2,800,683 ▲26.1%
- Rank: 136 out of 423
Services
Preceding station	New York City Subway	Following station
Fulton Street A C via Canal Street	A (New York City Subway service) C (New York City Subway service)	Jay Street–MetroTech A C via Hoyt–Schermerhorn Streets
Location
Location within New York City Subway
Location within New York City
Location within New York
Track layout
Street map
Station service legend
Symbol	Description
Stops all times except late nights	Stops all times except late nights
Stops all times	Stops all times

The High Street station, also signed as High Street–Brooklyn Bridge, and also referred to as Brooklyn Bridge Plaza and Cranberry Street, is a station on the IND Eighth Avenue Line of the New York City Subway. It is located at Cadman Plaza East near Red Cross Place and the Brooklyn Bridge approach in Brooklyn Heights, Brooklyn. Its name comes from older street names; its original location was at the intersection of High Street and Washington Street. The High Street station is served by the A train at all times and by the C train except at night.

== History ==
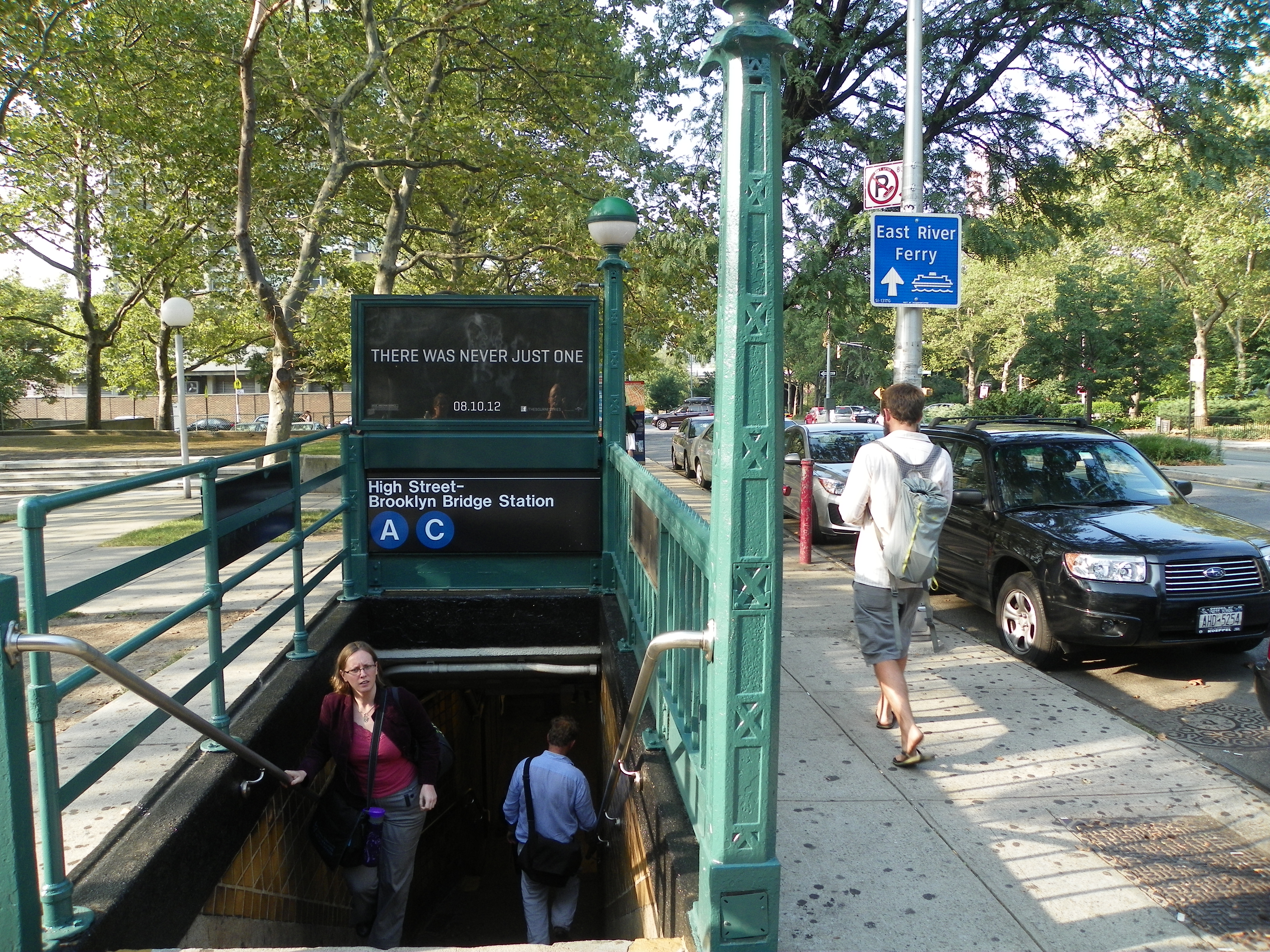
Station entrance, with a sign that gives the station name as "High Street–Brooklyn Bridge"

The High Street station was part of a three-stop extension of the IND Eighth Avenue Line from Chambers Street in Lower Manhattan to Jay Street–Borough Hall in Downtown Brooklyn. Construction of the extension began in June 1928. Due to the station's proximity to the Cranberry Street Tunnel under the East River, instead of typical cut-and-cover (or open-cut) construction methods, the station site was constructed 70 feet (21 m) below the street (the tunnel is 90 feet (27 m) below the surface at its lowest point) using mining techniques. The station was built between the eastern ends of the cast-iron river tubes reinforced with cement, leading to its tubular design. The depth of the station meant that few buildings in the area would be disturbed or demolished, except for two structures along Cranberry Street between Henry Street and Old Fulton Street.

The extension opened to Jay Street on February 1, 1933, but the High Street station remained closed for an additional five months. The trains ran through the station without stopping, because the escalators to the street had not been completed due to lack of funding. That month, the contract for four escalators in the station was awarded to Otis Elevator Company. The station opened on June 24, 1933.

The station was located below the sites of the Sands Street terminal for BMT elevated trains, some of which traveled over the Brooklyn Bridge. The BMT station closed in 1944 and was replaced by Cadman Plaza. Old Fulton Street (now Cadman Plaza West) and Cranberry Street was also the site of the printing shop where Walt Whitman's Leaves of Grass was first published in 1855. The area is now the site of the Whitman Close Apartments.

The High Street station was the site of an attempted robbery of subway revenue on June 18, 1954, in which the unarmed perpetrator was fatally shot by one of the two armed transit employees collecting fares and already-used transfer slips from token booths.

In the 1970s, the escalators at the eastern end of the station to Adams Street were replaced. New York City councilmember Lincoln Restler founded a volunteer group, the Friends of MTA Station Group, in early 2023 to advocate for improvements to the High Street station and four other subway stations in Brooklyn. In 2024, Skanska was hired to replace 21 escalators across the New York City Subway system for $146 million, including one escalator at the High Street station.

== Station layout ==
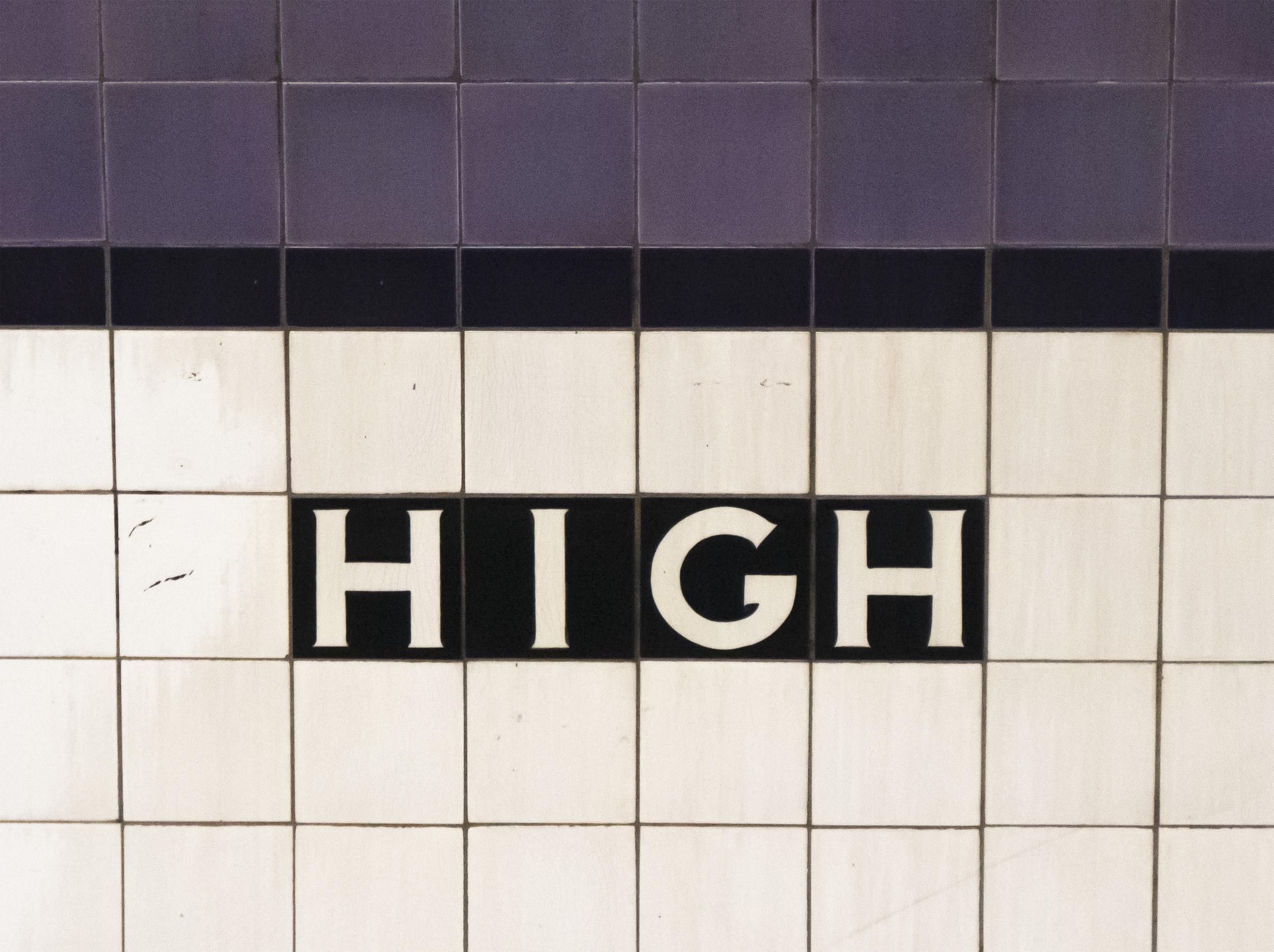
Tile caption below trim line

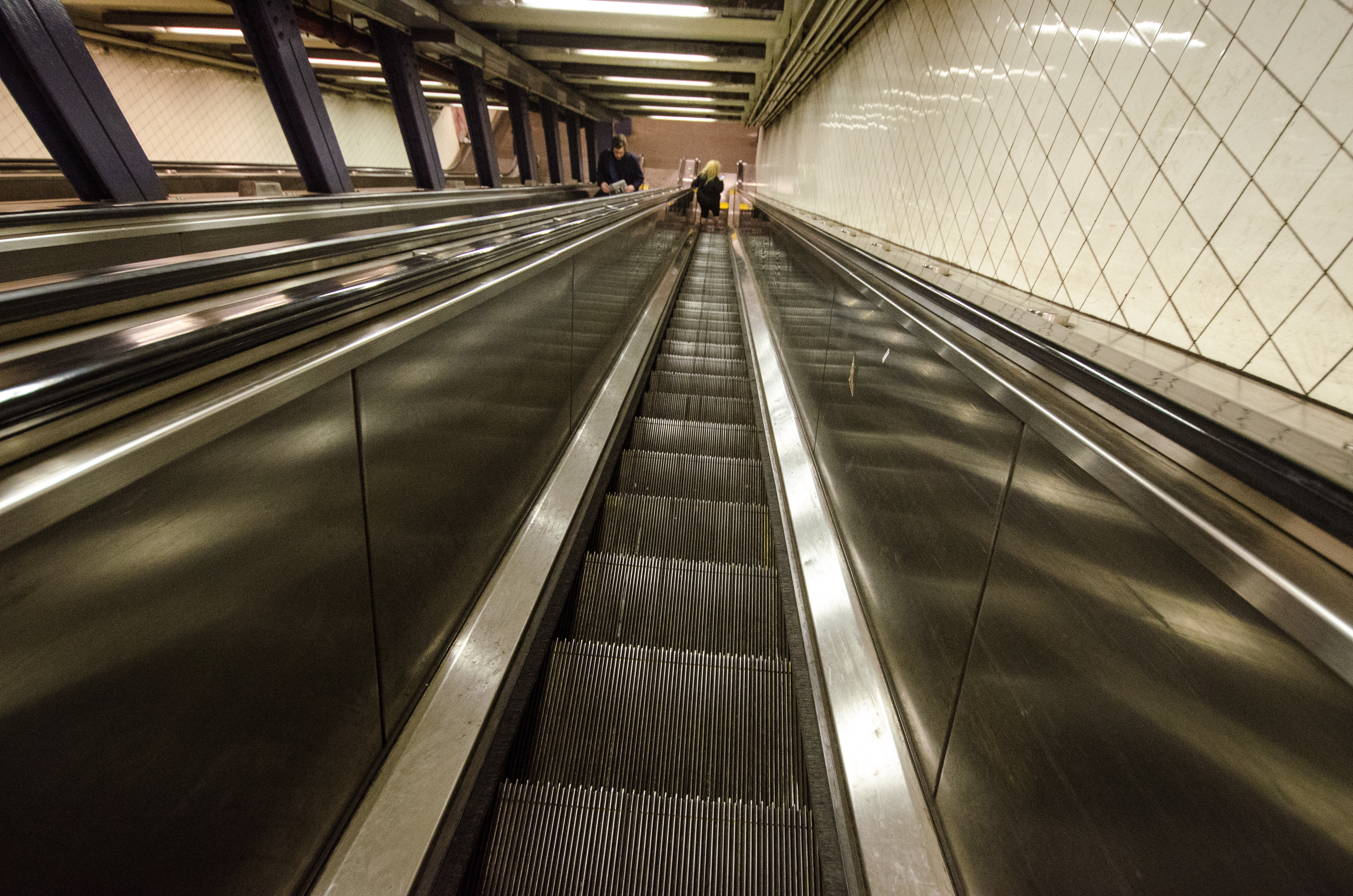
One of the sets of escalators to the station's platforms

This underground station has two tracks and one island platform. The station is served by the A train at all times and by the C train except at night. The station is between Fulton Street in Manhattan to the west (railroad north) and Jay Street–MetroTech to the east (railroad south).

It is the northernmost Brooklyn station on the line; west of the station, the line enters the Cranberry Street Tunnel and passes under the East River into Manhattan. As a result, the station was built in a tube design, and built with escalators between the upper fare control level and the lower mezzanine level to easier traverse the 70 foot (21 m) drop below street level.

East of the station, the line curves south onto Jay Street and has three track switches with the IND Sixth Avenue Line. A power station for the line is located on the west side of Jay Street just north of Concord Street. A second substation is located at Red Cross Place and Cadman Plaza East.

Both trackside walls have a dark lavender trim line with an eggplant border, below which are small tile captions reading "HIGH" in white lettering on a black background. Thick I-beam columns painted dark indigo run along the platform at regular intervals, alternating ones having the standard black station name plate with white lettering.

=== Exits ===
There are exits at both ends to the full length mezzanine along with evidence of removed center exits; since this station was built, the area now known as Cadman Plaza was completely rebuilt. Cadman Plaza East, the short one-block street outside the Red Cross Place exit, was previously called Washington Street; the Washington Street moniker still applies to the road north of Prospect Street. High Street is not directly accessible from the station, as the short one-block street is interrupted by a parking lot. However, Red Cross Place, which was once a part of High Street, is directly accessible.

The geographic western exit leads to Cadman Plaza West/Old Fulton Street (formerly Fulton Street, as indicated on wall mosaic signs) in Brooklyn Heights, a few hundred feet south of Cadman Plaza West's intersection with Middagh Street. This was the original exit to the station. The eastern exits lead to Adams Street, on the border of Brooklyn Heights, DUMBO and Downtown Brooklyn, adjacent to the central courthouse for the Federal Eastern District of New York. These exits were opened following an additional delay to complete the escalators. Adams Street was widened from 100 feet (30 m) to 160 feet (49 m) in the 1950s to accommodate new ramps to the Brooklyn Bridge, and now carries the secondary name "Brooklyn Bridge Boulevard". The current exit staircases lead to either side of Adams Street, acting as a pedestrian underpass. There are painted-over mosaics pointing to former exits at Washington Street (now Cadman Plaza East).

== Ridership ==
In 2017, the station had 2,983,672 boardings, making it the 171st most used station in the 425-station system. This amounted to an average of 9,215 passengers per weekday. In 2014, the station had an average of 8,870 daily weekday boardings, up from 5,410 daily boardings in 2005; this represented a 64 percent ridership increase over nine years. The station is the 26th busiest of all stations served by the A and C trains.
