= IND Eighth Avenue Line =

New York City Subway line

- The A, C, and E trains, which use the Eighth Avenue Line through Midtown Manhattan, are colored blue. The B and D trains also serve the portion of the line in Upper Manhattan.

Overview
- Owner: City of New York
- Locale: Manhattan, New York City
- Termini: 207th Street; South of High Street
- Stations: 31 (Note: The Metropolitan Transportation Authority considers Chambers Street and World Trade Center to be separate stations. If Chambers Street-World Trade Center is considered a single station, the count drops to 30.)

Service
- Type: Rapid transit
- System: New York City Subway
- Operator: New York City Transit Authority
- Daily ridership: 125,000 (north of 59th Street Columbus Circle) 398,000 (south of 59th Street Columbus Circle)

History
- Opened: September 10, 1932; 94 years ago
- Last extension: 1933

Technical
- Line length: 14 mi (23 km)
- Number of tracks: 2–4
- Character: Underground
- Track gauge: 4 ft 8 1/2 in (1,435 mm) standard gauge
- Electrification: Third rail, 625 V DC
Route map
Express station	Local station	Closed station

The IND Eighth Avenue Line (Note: The line is also referred to using different names, such as the IND Central Park West Line, IND Washington Heights Line, or IND Eighth Avenue-Fulton Street Line. The line is chained to the same channel as the IND Fulton Street Line.) is a rapid transit line in the B Division of the New York City Subway. Opened in 1932, it was the first line of the Independent Subway System (IND); as such, New Yorkers originally applied the Eighth Avenue Subway name to the entire IND system.

The line runs from 207th Street in Inwood south to an interlocking south of High Street in Brooklyn Heights, including large sections under St. Nicholas Avenue, Central Park West, and Eighth Avenue. The entire length is underground, though the 207th Street Yard, which branches off near the north end, is on the surface. Flying junctions are provided with the IND Concourse Line, IND Sixth Avenue Line, and IND Queens Boulevard Line.

Most of the line has four tracks, with one local and one express track in each direction, except for the extreme north and south ends, where only the two express tracks continue. Internally, the line is chained as Line "A", with tracks A1, A3, A4, and A2 from west to east, running from approximately 800 at the south end to 1540 at the north end (measured in hectofeet).

The whole line is served at all times by the A train, which runs express except during late nights. The C provides local service south of 168th Street while the A runs express. In addition, the B provides weekday local service and the D full-time express service between the Concourse Line (145th Street) and Sixth Avenue Line (59th Street–Columbus Circle) junctions, and the E runs local from the Queens Boulevard Line junction at 50th Street south to World Trade Center. The A, C, and E are colored blue on signs because they run via Eighth Avenue through Midtown Manhattan, while the B and D are orange since they use the Sixth Avenue Line through Midtown Manhattan.

== Extent and service ==
The following services use part or all of the Eighth Avenue Line. The trunk line's bullets are colored blue:

	Time period			Section of line
	rush hours, middays, and evenings	weekends	late nights	Section of line
"A" train	express		local	entire line
"C" train	local		no service	south of 168 St
"E" train	local			between 50 St and WTC
"B" train	local	no service		between 145 St and 59 St
"D" train	express			between 145 St and 59 St

The Eighth Avenue Line begins as a two-track subway under Broadway at 207th Street in Inwood. A flying junction just to the south brings two tracks from the 207th Street Yard between the main tracks, merging after Dyckman Street. The subway leaves Broadway to pass under Fort Tryon Park to the north end of Fort Washington Avenue, which it follows to roughly 175th Street before turning southeast under private property.

The small 174th Street Yard lies under Broadway, with two tracks exiting to the south under that roadway. When the George Washington Bridge was designed in the 1920s, provisions were made for a lower deck that would carry these two tracks north from the yard and across the bridge, as well as two commuter rail tracks. However, when the lower level was added in 1962, it instead carried a roadway.

The two main tracks from Fort Washington Avenue enter Broadway near 172nd Street, curving and running underneath a public school (PS173M) at 174th Street, and other private property, and the yard tracks in a double-decker tunnel. A few blocks later, the lower tracks separate to straddle the yard tracks at 168th Street. The local/express split begins here, with the local tracks coming from the yard and the express tracks coming from Inwood. Contrary to standard practice, the two local tracks are in the center and the two express tracks are on the outside. Except during late nights, the local service (C) ends at 168th Street, reversing direction on the yard tracks; the A runs to 207th Street at all times, express except during late nights. South of 168th Street, the express (outer) tracks lower below the local tracks, forming another double-decker tunnel, this time under St. Nicholas Avenue.

North of 145th Street, the lower (express) tracks rise into the center, and the three-track IND Concourse Line enters St. Nicholas Avenue below the four-track Eighth Avenue Line. 145th Street is a two-level transfer station, with two island platforms on each level. To the south, the Concourse Line tracks rise and merge with the Eighth Avenue Line, carrying the B onto the local tracks and the D onto the express tracks. The resulting four-track line continues south under St. Nicholas Avenue and Eighth Avenue (Frederick Douglass Boulevard), which becomes Central Park West at 110th Street.

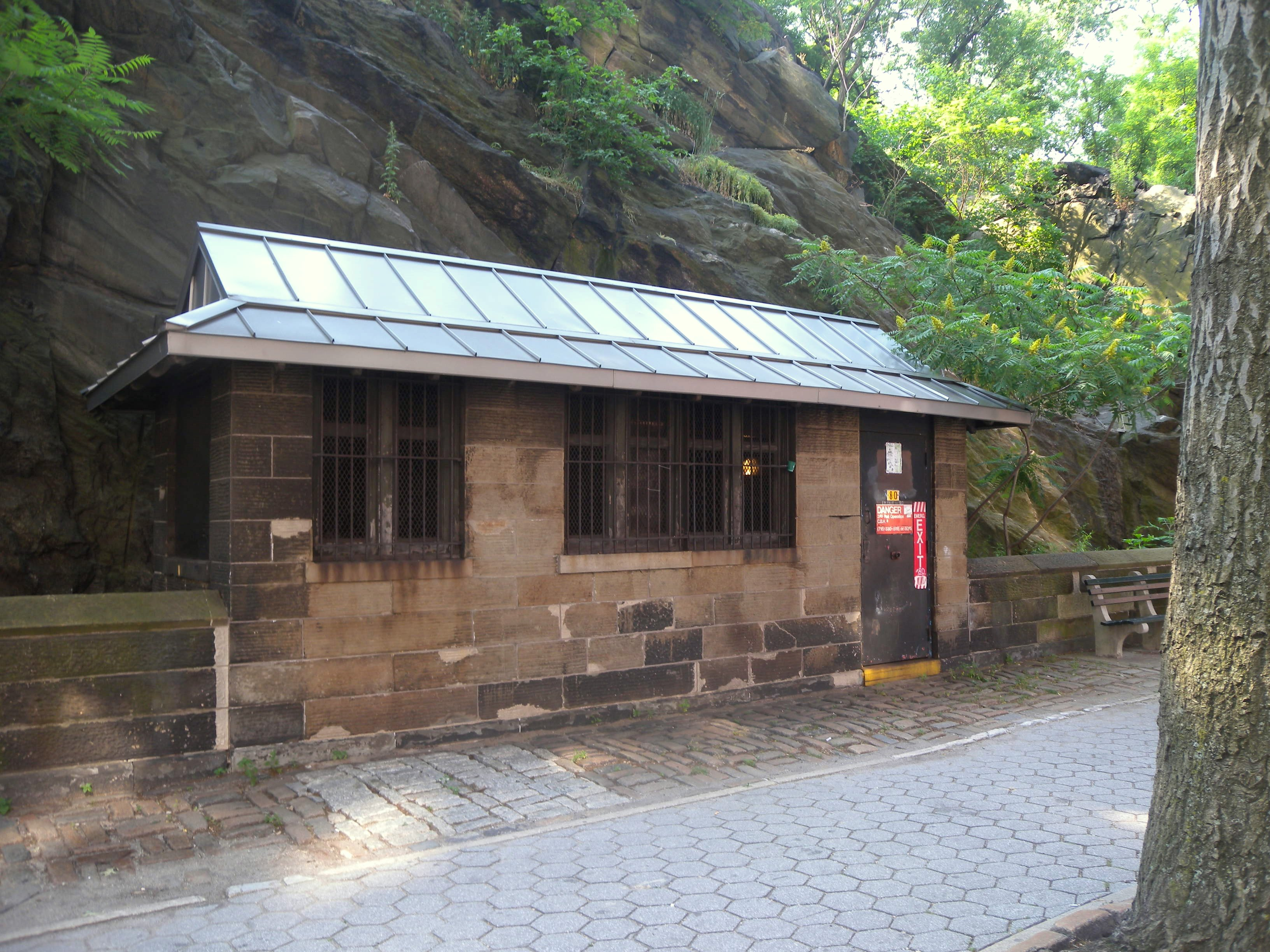
Emergency Exit #80 on Central Park West & West 104th Street

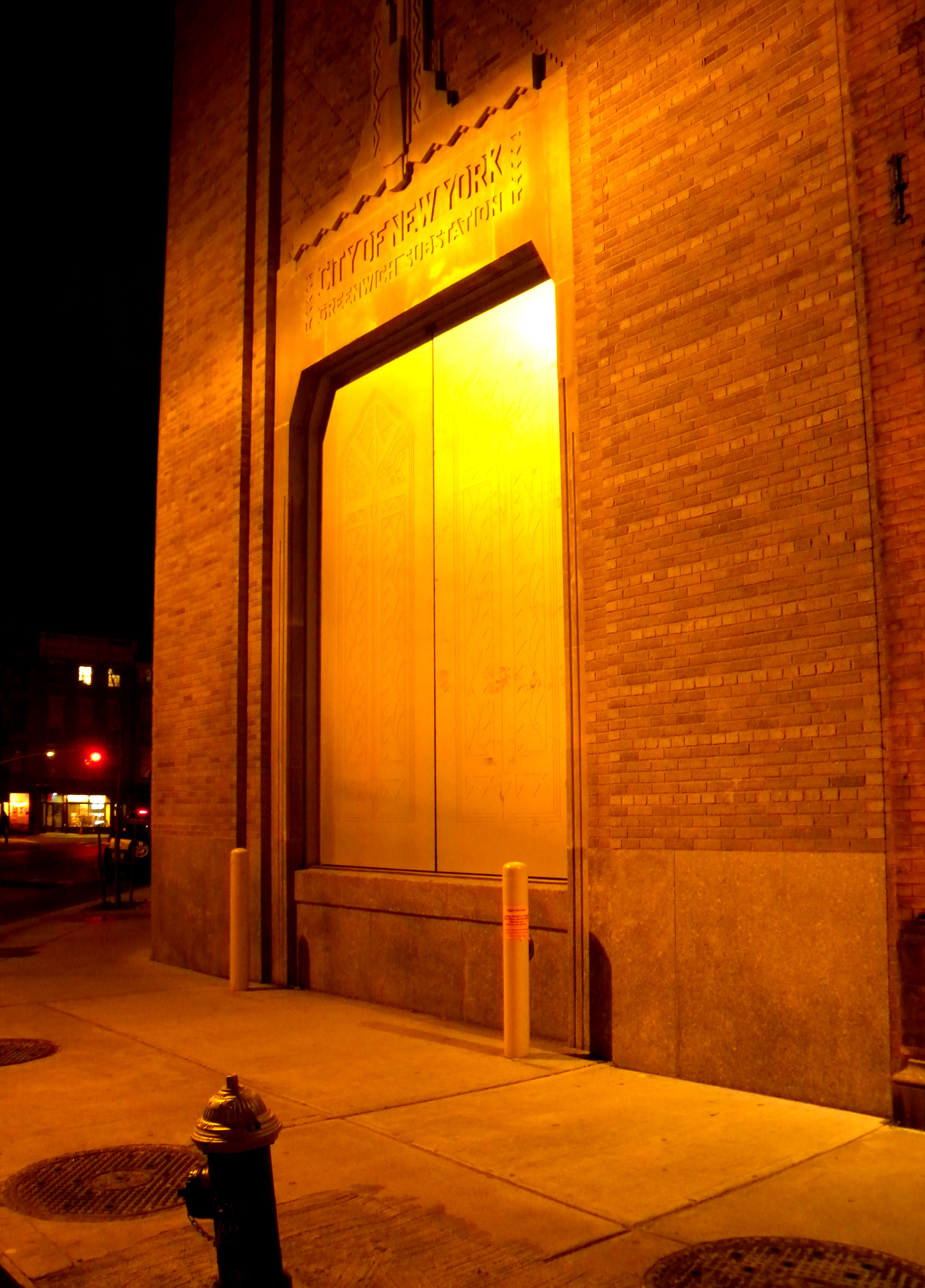
13th Street power station

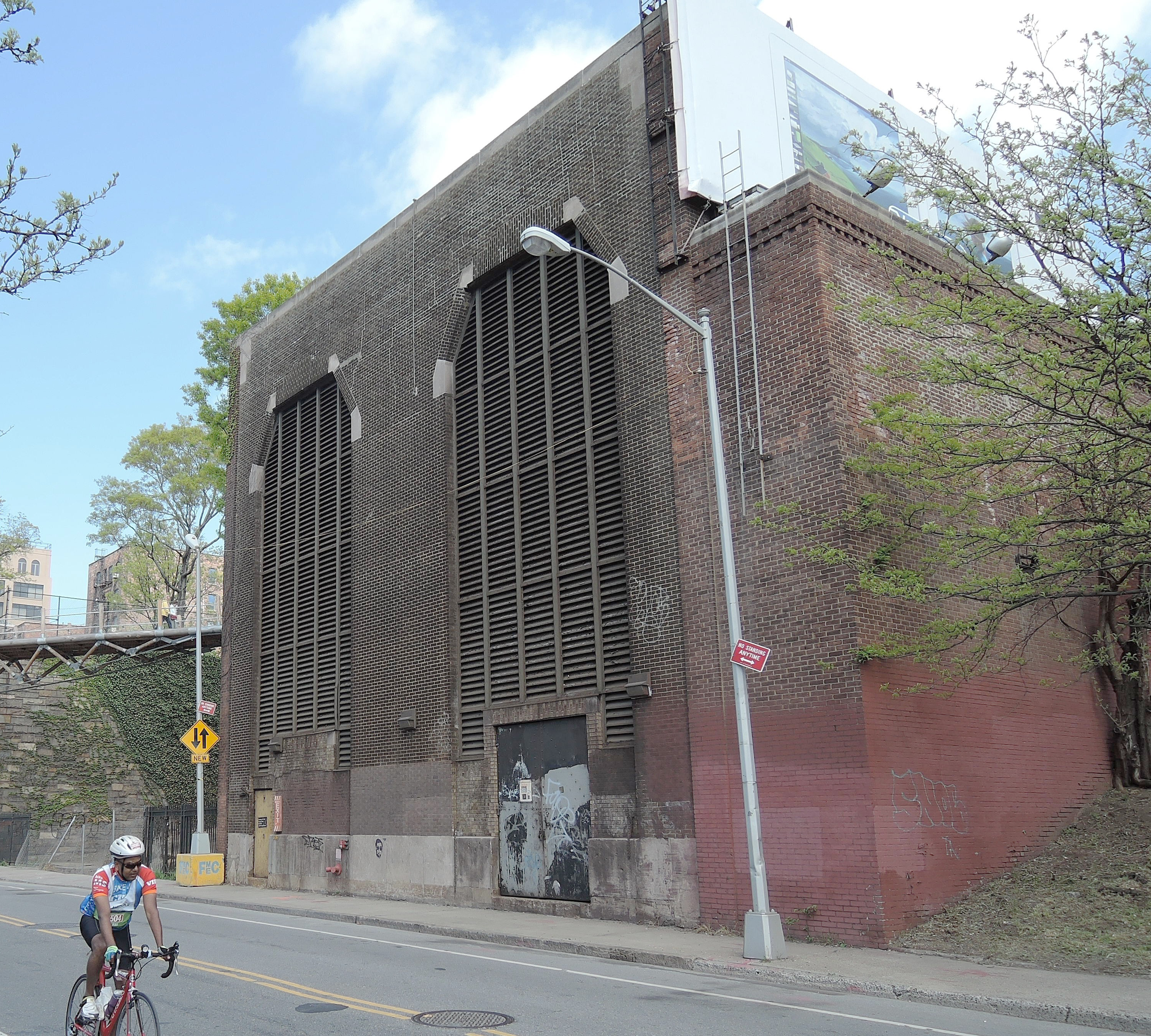
Cranberry Street ventilation building

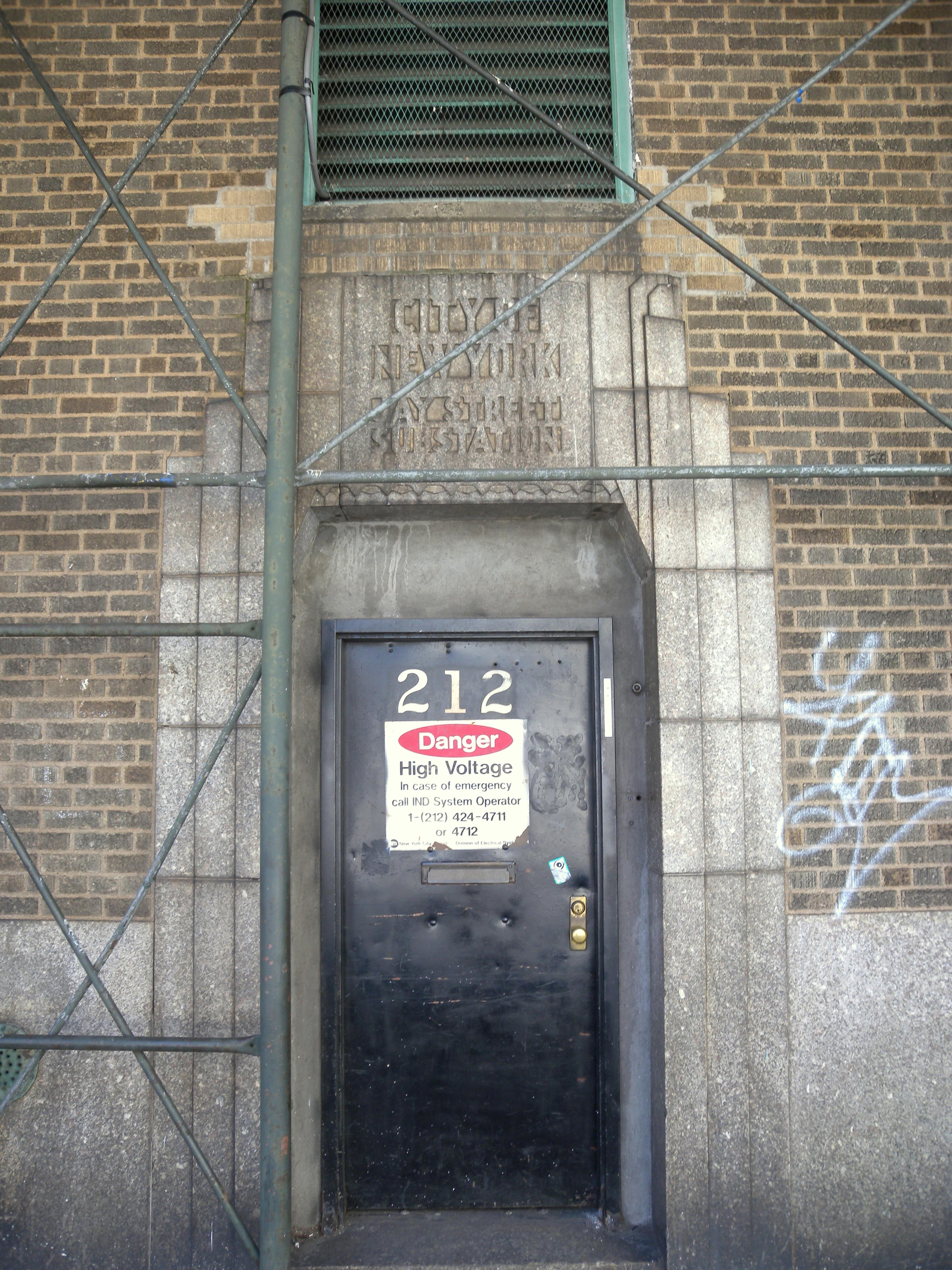
Jay Street power station

Most of the line under Central Park West is built on two levels with both local tracks to the west and only local stations. The two northbound tracks are above the two southbound tracks. Approaching 59th Street–Columbus Circle, where Central Park West becomes Eighth Avenue, the subway again spreads out into a single four-track level.

A flying junction south of 59th Street takes B and D trains east under 53rd Street, merging with two tracks from 57th Street to become the four-track IND Sixth Avenue Line. The two-track IND Queens Boulevard Line, also in 53rd Street, curves south into a lower level of the 50th Street station, and merges to the south, taking E trains onto the local tracks. An unused southbound-only lower level at 42nd Street–Port Authority Bus Terminal was formerly accessed only from the southbound track from the Queens Boulevard Line. Plans for the 7 Subway Extension required partially demolishing the lower level to make room for the new IRT Flushing Line tracks.

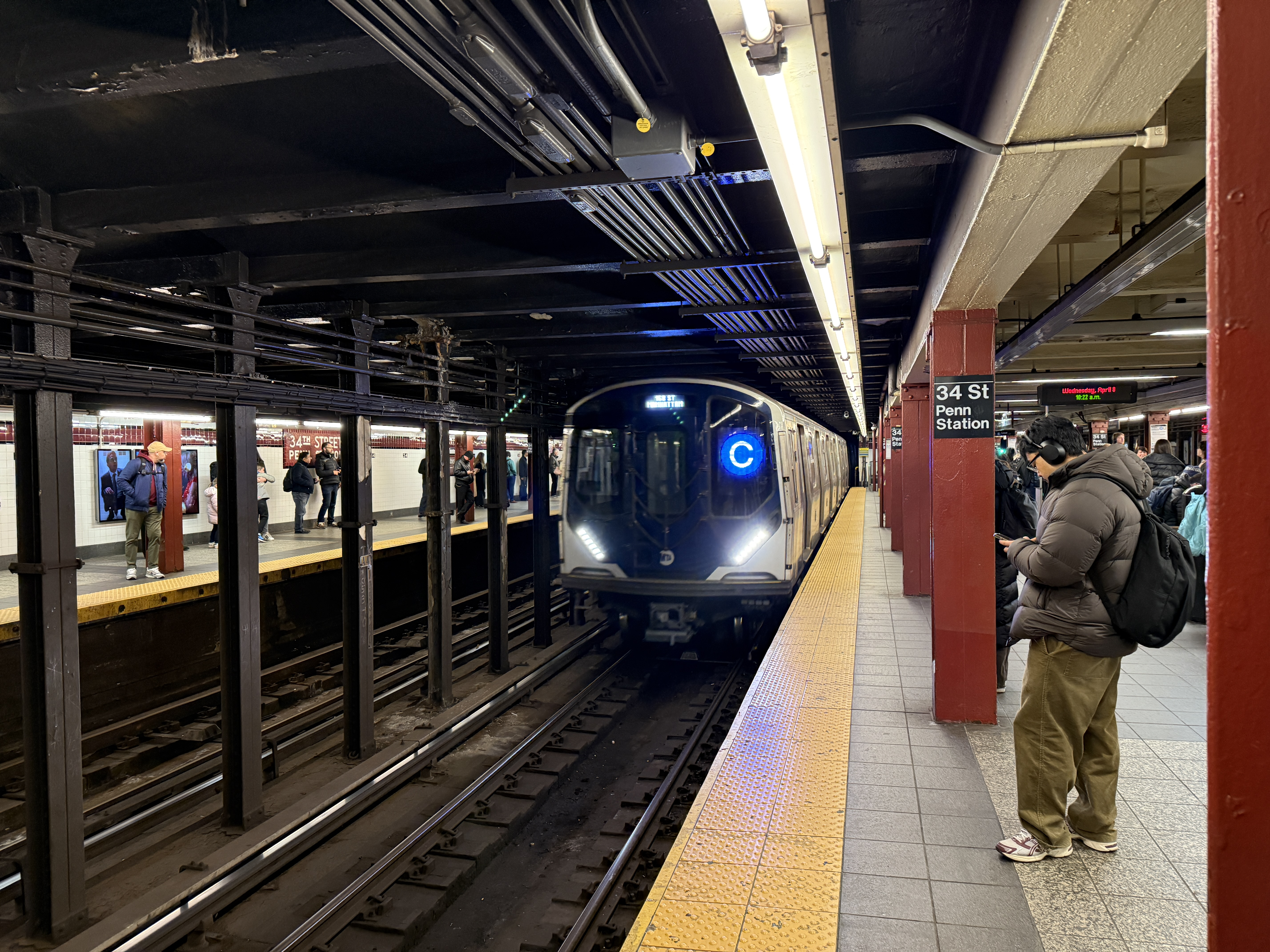
An uptown C train stops at 34th Street-Penn Station on the IND Eighth Avenue Line

The four-track line continues south under Eighth Avenue to 14th Street, where it turns southeast under Greenwich Avenue and south under Sixth Avenue, above the four-track IND Sixth Avenue Line. The two-level West Fourth Street–Washington Square station allows easy transfers between the two lines. Just to the south are track connections between the local tracks of each line, not used by current normal service patterns. The Sixth Avenue Line turns east into Houston Street after passing the connections.

Canal Street, under Sixth Avenue, is the last normal four-track station on the line. Crossovers in each direction, beyond the station, take C and late night A trains between the local tracks to the north and the express tracks to the south. As the subway turns from Sixth Avenue into Church Street, the southbound local track passes under the express tracks, bringing E trains to the east. At this point, a bellmouth originally intended for the never-built IND Worth Street Line is present on the east side of the tunnel. It has been proposed to use this to bring Long Island Rail Road Atlantic Branch trains to Lower Manhattan as part of the Lower Manhattan-Jamaica/JFK Transportation Project.

The four tracks continue south under Church Street, with two separate but connected stations at World Trade Center at the end of the local tracks and Chambers Street on the express tracks. The two express tracks turn east under Fulton Street, crossing the East River through the Cranberry Street Tunnel into Cranberry Street in Brooklyn. Cranberry Street leads to High Street, from which the line turns south into Jay Street, straddled by the two-track IND Sixth Avenue Line from the Rutgers Street Tunnel. The Eighth and Sixth Avenue Lines end, becoming the IND Fulton Street Line and IND Culver Line, at crossovers (currently unused) allowing trains to switch between the two, located between High Street and Jay Street–MetroTech. Both the A and C trains continue along the Fulton Street Line.

== History ==
=== Planning and construction ===
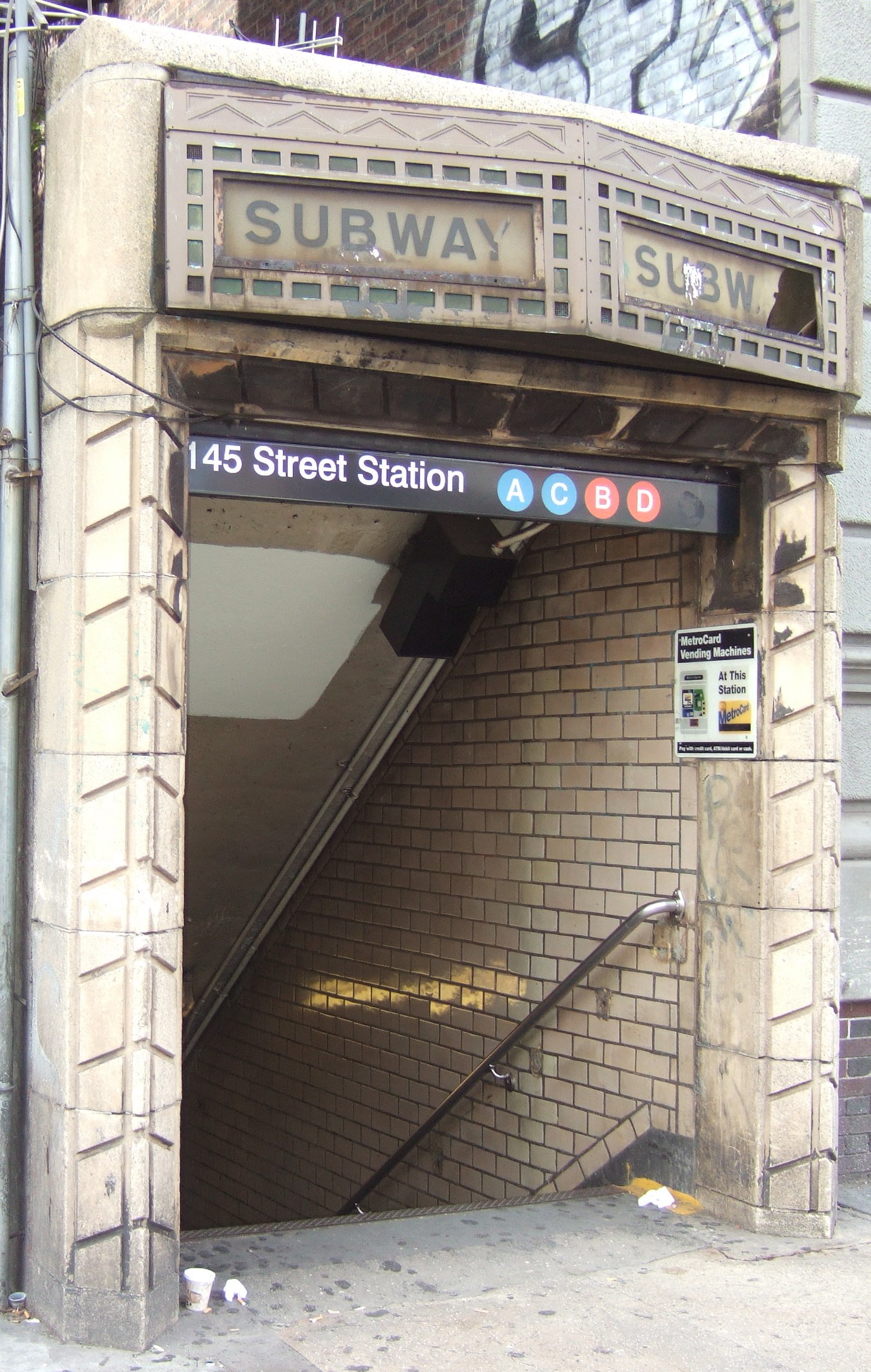
Entrance to 145th Street

As early as March 1918, soon after the BMT Broadway Line opened to Times Square–42nd Street, plans were being considered for an extension of that line beyond the stubs at 57th Street–Seventh Avenue to the Upper West Side and Washington Heights via Central Park West (Eighth Avenue). On August 3, 1923, the New York City Board of Estimate approved the Washington Heights Line, an extension of the Broadway Line to Washington Heights. The line was to have four tracks from Central Park West at 64th Street under Central Park West, Eighth Avenue, Saint Nicholas Avenue, and private property to 173rd Street, and two tracks under Fort Washington Avenue to 193rd Street. South of 64th Street, one two-track line would connect to the Broadway Line stubs at 57th Street, and another would continue under Eighth Avenue to 30th Street at Penn Station, with provisions to continue downtown.

Mayor John Hylan instead wanted to build an independent subway system, operated by the city. The New York City Board of Transportation (NYCBOT) gave preliminary approval to several lines in Manhattan, including one on Eighth Avenue, on December 9, 1924. The main portion of the already-approved Washington Heights Line—the mostly-four track line north of 64th Street—was included, but was to continue north from 193rd Street to 207th Street. South of 64th Street, the plan called for four tracks in Eighth Avenue, Greenwich Avenue, the planned extension of Sixth Avenue, and Church Street. Two tracks would turn east under Fulton Street or Wall Street and under the East River to Downtown Brooklyn.

A groundbreaking ceremony was held at St. Nicholas Avenue and 123rd Street on March 14, 1925. Most of the Eighth Avenue Line was dug using a cheap cut-and-cover method, where the street above was excavated. Still, the construction of the line was difficult, as it had to go under or over several subway lines. At 59th Street–Columbus Circle, workers had to be careful to not disrupt the existing IRT Broadway–Seventh Avenue Line overhead. 42nd Street, the longest station along the line at 1,115 feet (340 m), was expected to be a major express station with large platforms, so the platforms were staggered away from each other in order to avoid going under property lines. Additionally, several workers died in cave-ins during construction.

In the summer of 1926 the BOT held a public hearing and agreed upon the details of the construction of the subway line under Church Street. As part of the construction of the line, Church Street was widened from being 40 feet (12 m) wide to being 90 feet (27 m) wide to accommodate the subway underneath and was connected with a southern diagonal extension of Sixth Avenue, which was 100 feet (30 m). Had the street not been widened the construction would have cost an additional $7 million for the construction of a two-level subway structure. In January 1929, the city paid money awarded to adjacent property owners for property taken and awarded contracts for 15 feet (4.6 m)-wide sidewalks and a 60 feet (18 m)-wide roadway. The sidewalks had been 10 feet (3.0 m) wide and the roadway had been 20 feet (6.1 m) wide. New buildings were built on the west sides of Church Street. The east side of the street was not affected by the construction. $9,631,760 was awarded to 161 property owners whose property had been taken. 168,888 square feet of land had to be acquired to widen Church Street between Park Place and Canal Street.

In 1926 construction began on the extension of Sixth Avenue south from Carmine Street to Canal Street, to allow for the construction of the Eighth Avenue Line (which runs under the street south of Eighth Street), and to provide access to the Holland Tunnel. The construction of the extension was completed in 1930. The city condemned entire lots, displacing 10,000 people, to build the extension and used leftover land for parks.

The stations on the line were built with 600 feet (180 m) long platforms, but they had provisions to lengthen them to 660 feet (200 m) to accommodate eleven-car trains. Four of the express stations (at Fulton, 14th, 42nd, and 59th Streets) were built with long mezzanines so that passengers could walk the entire length of the mezzanines without having to pay a fare. It was proposed to develop the mezzanines of these four stations with shops, so that they would become retail corridors, similar to the underground mall of the under-construction Rockefeller Center. The new subway required 800 cars and 1,500 staff. In June 1932, The New York Times reported that seven-car express trains would run between 168th and Chambers Streets, while five-car local trains would run between 207th and Chambers Streets. Both express and local trains would run at intervals of four to twelve minutes depending on the time of day. The new IND subway line also used a five-color pattern of tiles to facilitate navigation for travelers going away from Manhattan; the colors of the tiles changed at each express station.

=== Early operation ===
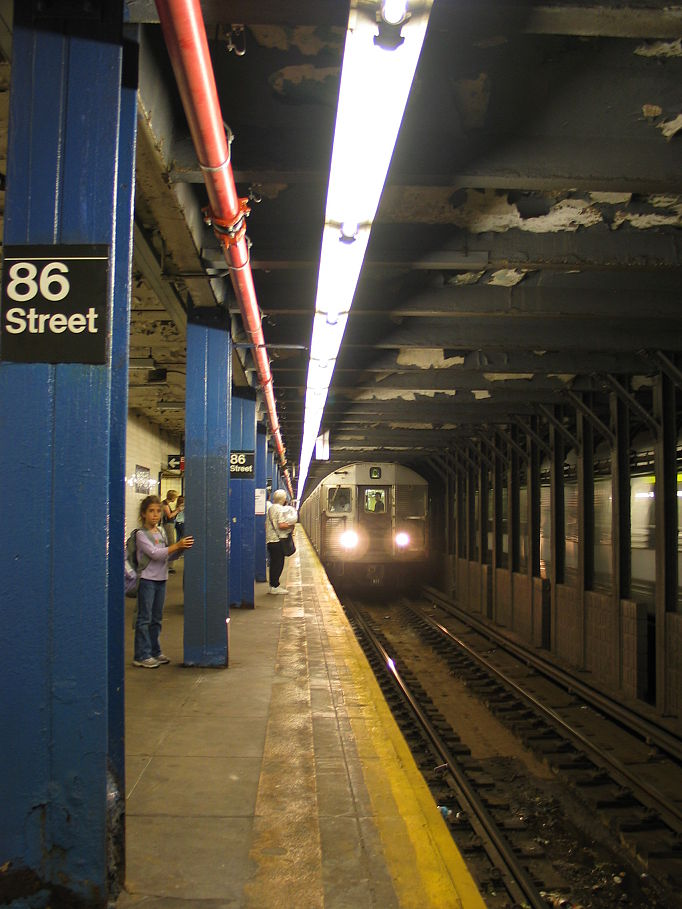
Lower-level local station on Central Park West (86th Street)

The majority of the Eighth Avenue Line, from Chambers Street north to 207th Street, was opened to the public just after midnight on September 10, 1932, after three days of operation on a normal schedule but without passengers. The Cranberry Street Tunnel, extending the express tracks east under Fulton Street to Jay Street–Borough Hall in Brooklyn, was opened for the morning rush hour on February 1, 1933, with the exception of the station at High Street, which opened on June 24, 1933. Initially, only the Fulton Street entrance was open; the Adams Street entrance would open later once its escalators were completed. The Jay–Smith–Ninth Street Line opened on March 20, 1933, extending the line beyond Jay Street–Borough Hall.

When the subway opened in 1932, express (A) and local (AA) trains served the line; expresses did not run during late nights or Sundays. Expresses and late night/Sunday locals were sent south into Brooklyn on February 1, 1933, and, when the IND Concourse Line opened on July 1, 1933, the C was added to the express service, while all locals became CC trains to the Concourse Line, forcing A trains to run local north of 145th Street. The E was added to the local tracks south of 50th Street on August 19, 1933, when the IND Queens Boulevard Line opened.

The final major change came on December 15, 1940, when the IND Sixth Avenue Line opened. The AA was brought back as a non-rush hour local service, becoming the BB and switching to the Sixth Avenue Line at 59th Street–Columbus Circle during rush hours. The CC was kept only during rush hours to provide local service south past 59th Street. Additionally the C became a rush hour-only service, replaced by a full-time D over the express tracks between the Concourse and Sixth Avenue Lines. This created the pattern that has remained to this day, with five services during normal hours: the A express, B part-time local via Sixth Avenue (then BB), C local (then AA and CC), D express via Sixth Avenue, and E local from Queens.

=== Later years ===
In 1953, the platforms were lengthened at Spring Street and Canal Street to 660 feet (200 m) to allow E trains to run eleven-car trains. The E began running eleven-car trains during rush hours on September 8, 1953. The extra train car increased the total carrying capacity by 4,000 passengers. The lengthening project cost $400,000.

Southbound E trains began stopping at the lower level of the 42nd Street station during rush hours on March 23, 1970, to reduce delays by relieving congestion on the station's platforms.

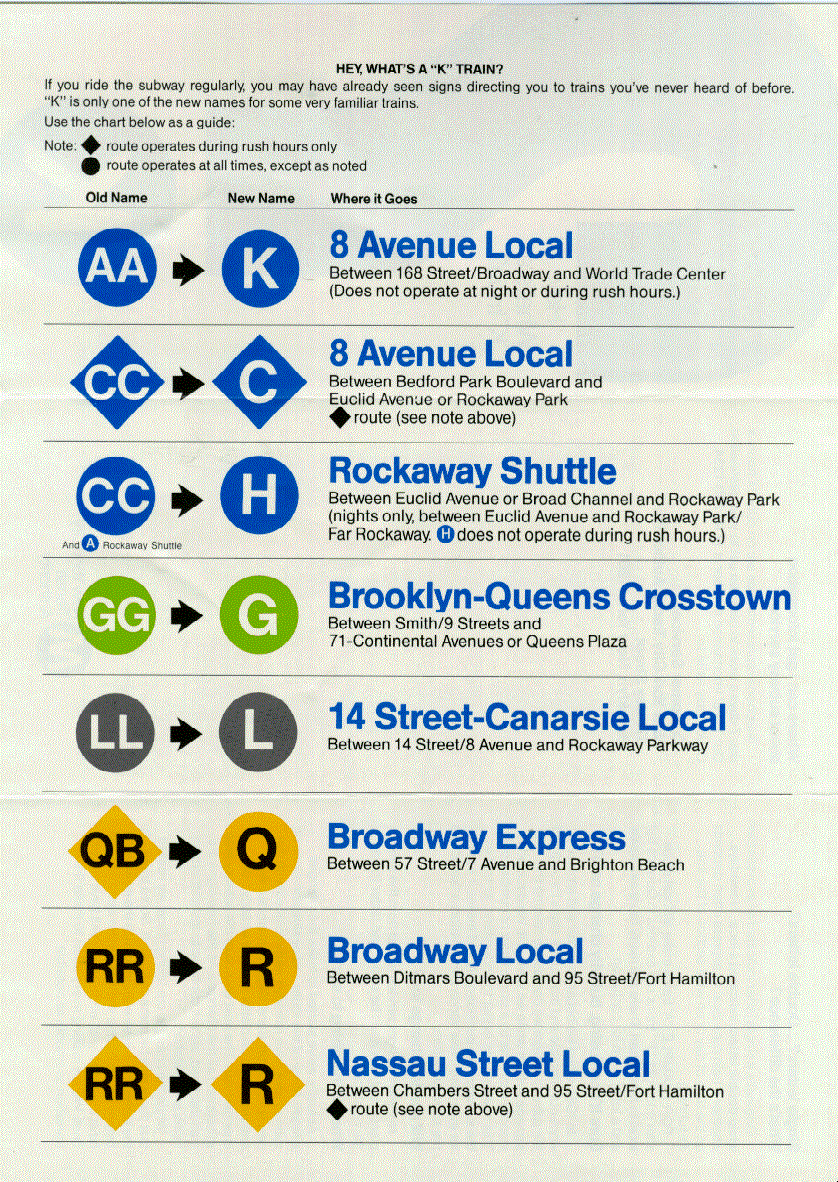
Brochure showing the elimination of double letters

On August 28, 1977, late night AA service was eliminated. The A began making local stops in Manhattan during late nights, when the AA was not running. On May 6, 1985, the IND practice of using double letters to indicate local service was discontinued. The AA was renamed the K and rush hour CC service was renamed C. This change was not officially reflected in schedules until May 24, 1987.

On December 10, 1988, the K designation was discontinued and merged into the C, which now ran at all times except late nights. The C ran from Bedford Park Boulevard to Rockaway Park during rush hours, 145th Street to Euclid Avenue during middays, and from 145th Street to World Trade Center during evenings and weekends. The A now ran express in Brooklyn during middays, and the B was extended to 168th Street during middays and early evenings.

On September 3, 1989, a water main lined with asbestos in the vicinity of 53rd Street and Eighth Avenue broke and caused major disruptions to service between 59th Street–Columbus Circle and 34th Street–Penn Station due to the tunnels becoming flooded with water and asbestos. A and C trains originated and terminated at 34th Street instead of their normal northern terminals, and E trains were rerouted via Sixth Avenue in both directions; the 50th, 42nd and 23rd Street stations were closed while the cleanup process was underway. Full service was restored on October 1.

On May 29, 1994, weekend C service between 7 a.m. and 11 p.m. was extended to 168th Street to allow A trains to run express. Beginning April 30, 1995, C service was extended to 168th Street during middays as construction on the Manhattan Bridge cut B service from Manhattan. On November 11, 1995, midday service was cut back to 145th Street after B service to 168th Street was restored. The change was made to reduce crowding on the C and to reduce passenger confusion about the C's route.

The B and the C, which both ran local along Central Park West, switched northern terminals on March 1, 1998, ending the connection between the C and the Bronx. Instead of alternating between three different terminals depending on the time of day, all C service now terminated at 168th Street.

A report for the Lower Manhattan Development Corporation looking at the Lower Manhattan Rail Link, an idea to connect Lower Manhattan with the Long Island Rail Road and JFK International Airport, presented several alternatives that would utilize the Cranberry Street Tunnel instead of building a new East River Tunnel. These alternatives would have required that C trains be rerouted through the Rutgers Street Tunnel.

In the wake of the September 11, 2001 attacks, World Trade Center station was temporarily unusable as a terminal for the E. C service was suspended until September 24, 2001. Local service along Central Park West was replaced by the A and D, and the E was extended from Canal Street to Euclid Avenue replacing C service in Brooklyn.

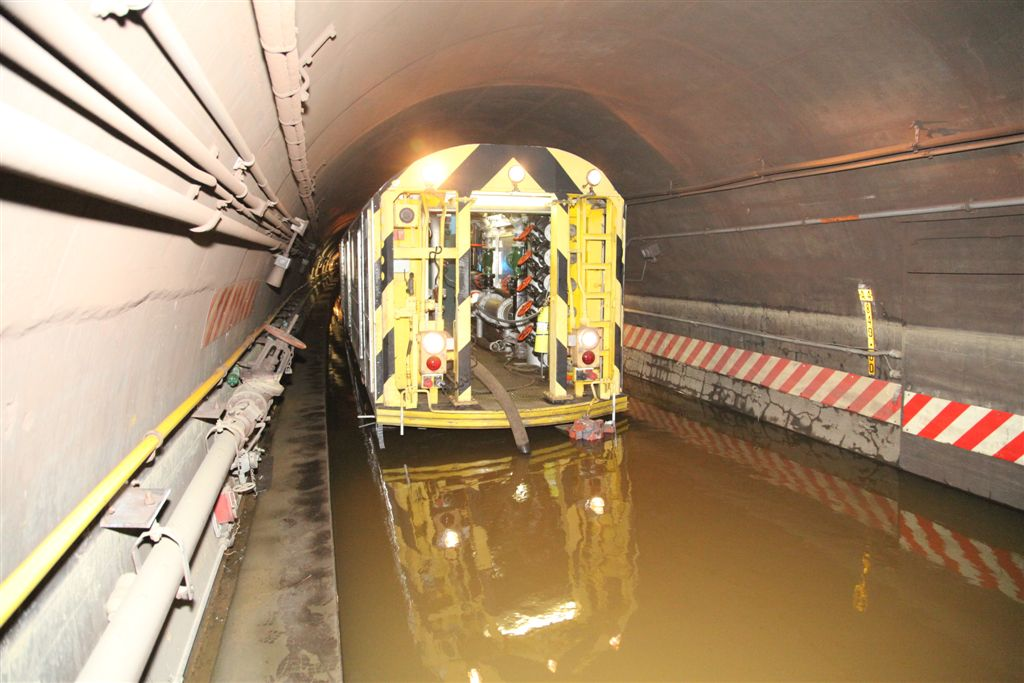
Pump train in the Cranberry Street Tunnel after Hurricane Sandy

On January 23, 2005, a fire at the Chambers Street signal room crippled A and C service. C service was suspended until February 2 and was replaced by the A, B, D, E, and V trains along different parts of its route. Initial assessments suggested that it would take several years to restore normal service, but the damaged equipment was replaced with available spare parts, and normal service resumed on April 21.

The 2015–2019 Metropolitan Transportation Authority Capital Plan called for five of the Eighth Avenue Line's stations, along with 28 others, to undergo a complete overhaul as part of the Enhanced Station Initiative. The stations receiving renovations are 34th Street–Penn Station, 72nd Street, 86th Street, Cathedral Parkway–110th Street, and 163rd Street–Amsterdam Avenue. Updates included cellular service, Wi-Fi, USB charging stations, interactive service advisories and maps, improved signage, and improved station lighting. As part of the renovations, 72nd Street was closed from May 7, 2018, to October 4, 2018, and 86th Street was closed from June 4, 2018, to October 26, 2018. In addition, the Cathedral Parkway–110th Street station was closed from April 9, 2018, to the week of September 2–4, 2018, and 163rd Street was closed from March 12, 2018, to September 27, 2018.

==== Communications-based train control ====
Funding for the design of CBTC on the IND Eighth Avenue Line from 59th Street–Columbus Circle to High Street is provided in the 2015–2019 Capital Program, along with the modernization of interlockings at 30th Street and north of 42nd Street, and the removal of an unused interlocking south of 42nd Street. The design of the Eighth Avenue Line CBTC project will be done concurrently with the Queens Boulevard Line West and East automation, allowing the E route to be semi-automated when the project is done. It will get two new electrical substations to support CBTC upgrades. Additionally, the R179 and R211 fleets will be made compatible with CBTC. Construction was originally scheduled to begin in October 2018, but a contract for CBTC installation was later pushed back to the first quarter of 2019. In March 2019, in preparation for the implementation of CBTC on the Eighth Avenue Line, the MTA board ratified a contract with Thales Group for the installation of CBTC equipment on the R211 fleet.

On January 13, 2020, the MTA announced that it had awarded the contract to L. K. Comstock & Company, Inc. for $245.8 million. The signaling for the contract will be provided by Siemens. This will be the first CBTC project in the system to use axle-counters instead of insulated joints and track circuits. Axle counters are more resilient to debris and water, making them more reliable, and have been used for decades in systems around the world, and will reduce the time it takes to complete CBTC projects, the cost of completing work, and maintenance and life-cycle costs. Axle counters also allow CBTC testing before cutovers, reducing the time it takes to complete cutovers and any risks associated with them. As of November 2020, the entire project is budgeted at $733.6 million. The project will be completed by January 2025. Work was 57 percent complete in April 2022. Due to delays in the completion of the R211 rolling stock contract, an alternative cutover plan was developed to allow CBTC on the local tracks to be placed into use before the express tracks.

=== IND Worth Street Line ===
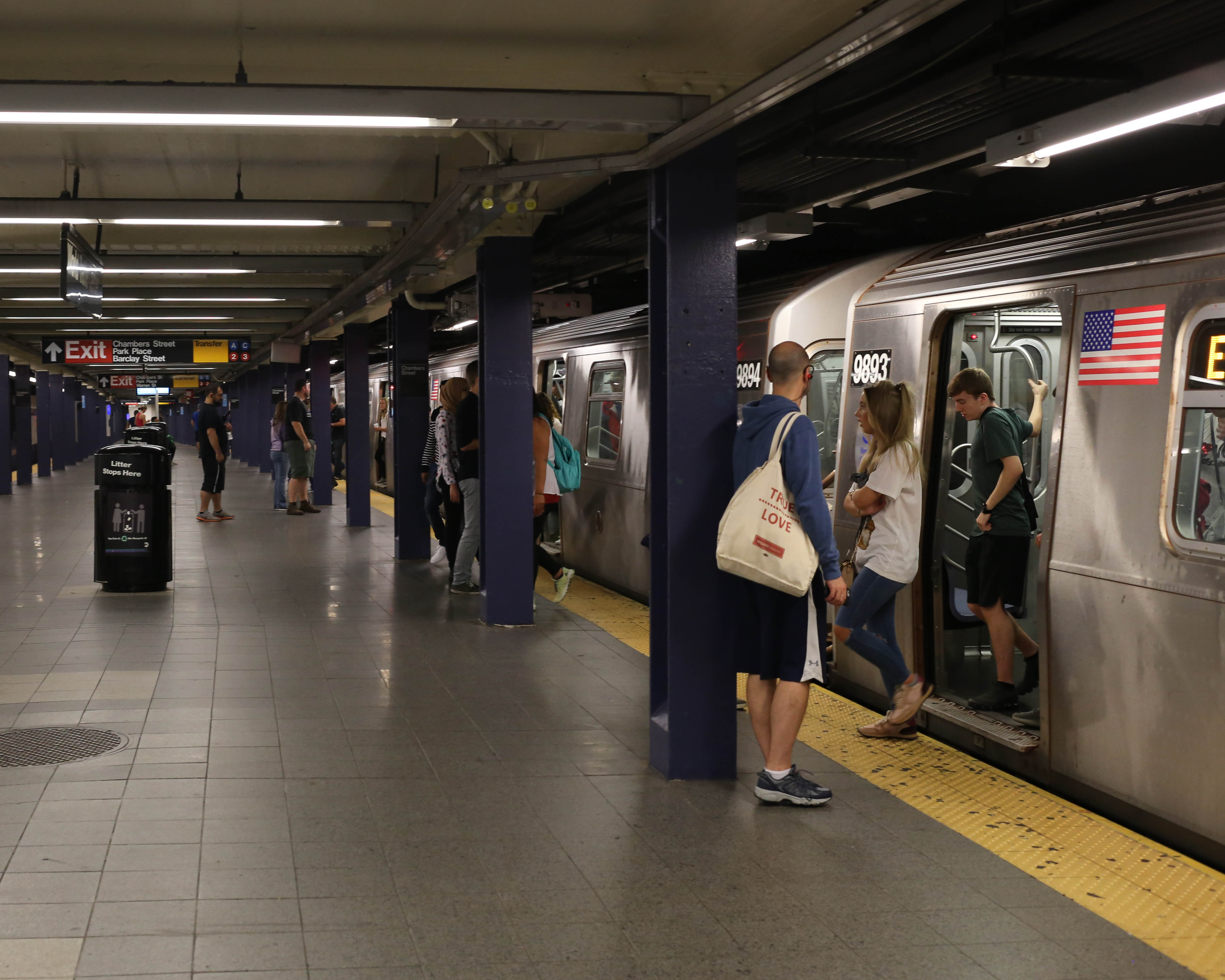
World Trade Center, the southern terminus for the local tracks

The IND Worth Street Line was a proposed major expansion of the IND Eighth Avenue Line. The line would have branched off of the line's local tracks at the intersection of Church Street and Franklin Street to the south of the Canal Street station and would have turned southeast into Worth Street. This route would have traveled in a two-track tunnel. It would have probably stopped at Foley Square (Lafayette and Centre Streets, on the north side of Federal Plaza), Chatham Square (with a possible connection to the Second Avenue Subway), Rutgers Street–East Broadway (with a connection to the IND Rutgers Street Line), and a station on the Lower East Side (possibly Pitt Street and Grand Street). This portion would have been about 1.95 miles (3.14 km) long and would have cost about $13 million. Crossing to Williamsburg, the line was to have stops at Havemeyer Street and Union Avenue, the latter of which would have had connections to the IND Crosstown Line and a major junction to the IND Houston Street Line, the IND Utica Avenue Line, and a connection to the Rockaways.

In March 1930, public hearings were held by the BOT concerning the construction and planning of this line. At the March 12 hearing, the project's construction was endorsed by east side civic organizations. In June 1930, the Board of Estimate approved the construction of the line, and in July Chairman Delaney sent letters to 450 real estate owners outlining the planned route and requested their consent for the construction of the project, of which the Board needed 50%. On August 23, 1930, bids on the construction of the connection (bellmouths) between the Eighth Avenue Line and the proposed Worth Street Line were put up for bid by the Board of Transportation. These bellmouths were constructed to allow work on the Worth Street Line to be done without interrupting service on the Eighth Avenue Line. This route was expected to the first line of the IND Second System to be built. At the time it was anticipated that the line would open a year or so after the completion of the Eighth Avenue Line under the East River to Brooklyn. However, the construction of the line was delayed due to the city's lack of funding after 1932. The Board of Transportation resumed efforts to build the line after a study of existing conditions in the area was completed, and on the basis that funding would be provided from government and private sources. The plans were truncated to a three-stop crosstown line entirely within Manhattan. Stops would have been located at Foley Square, Rutgers Street, and Lewis Street. The Lewis Street stop, located on the Lower East Side, would have been the line's terminal. Construction was expected to begin in 1937 and be complete by 1944. In 1938 the cost of the line was pegged by the BOT to be $16.73 million.

Even though these bellmouths were never used and the line was never completed, the bellmouths are still visible south of Canal Street adjacent to the local tracks. Other provisions were built in anticipation of the construction of the line. A large open space above the platform level at the East Broadway station on the Sixth Avenue Line was intended to become a two-track station. Above the tunnel north of the Broadway station on the Crosstown Line, a six-track station shell was partially completed. This station would have provided service to the IND Worth Street and the Houston Street Lines.

== Station listing ==
Station service legend
Stops all times	Stops 24 hours a day
Stops all times except late nights	Stops every day during daytime hours only
Stops late nights only	Stops every day during overnight hours only
Stops weekdays during the day	Stops during weekday daytime hours only
Stops rush hours in the peak direction only	Stops during weekday rush hours in the peak direction only
Time period details
Disabled access	Station is compliant with the Americans with Disabilities Act
↑	Station is compliant with the Americans with Disabilities Act in the indicated direction only
↓	Station is compliant with the Americans with Disabilities Act in the indicated direction only
	Elevator access to mezzanine only

Neighborhood (approximate)	Disabled access	Station	Tracks	Services	Opened	Transfers and notes
Manhattan
Inwood	Disabled access	Inwood–207th Street	express	A	September 10, 1932	Bx12 Select Bus Service
Inwood	crossovers to connecting tracks to 207th Street Yard					
Inwood		Dyckman Street	express	A	September 10, 1932	
Inwood	connecting tracks to 207th Street Yard merge					
Washington Heights	Elevator access to mezzanine only	190th Street	express	A	September 10, 1932	
Washington Heights	Disabled access	181st Street	express	A	September 10, 1932	
Washington Heights	Disabled access	175th Street	express	A	September 10, 1932	George Washington Bridge Bus Station
Washington Heights	Local tracks begin in 174th Street Yard					
Washington Heights	Disabled access	168th Street	all	A C	September 10, 1932	IRT Broadway–Seventh Avenue Line (1 )
Washington Heights		163rd Street–Amsterdam Avenue	local	A C	September 10, 1932	
Washington Heights		155th Street	local	A C	September 10, 1932	Bx6 Select Bus Service
Harlem		145th Street	all	A C	September 10, 1932	IND Concourse Line (B D )
Harlem	IND Concourse Line joins (B D )					
Harlem		135th Street	local	A B C	September 10, 1932	
Harlem	Disabled access	125th Street	all	A B C D	September 10, 1932	M60 Select Bus Service to LaGuardia Airport
Harlem		116th Street	local	A B C	September 10, 1932	
Upper West Side		Cathedral Parkway–110th Street	local	A B C	September 10, 1932	
Upper West Side		103rd Street	local	A B C	September 10, 1932	
Upper West Side		96th Street	local	A B C	September 10, 1932	
Upper West Side		86th Street	local	A B C	September 10, 1932	M86 Select Bus Service
Upper West Side		81st Street–Museum of Natural History	local	A B C	September 10, 1932	M79 Select Bus Service
Upper West Side		72nd Street	local	A B C	September 10, 1932	
Midtown	Disabled access	59th Street–Columbus Circle	all	A B C D	September 10, 1932	IRT Broadway–Seventh Avenue Line (1 2 )
Midtown	IND Sixth Avenue Line splits (B D )					
Midtown	↓	50th Street	local	A C	September 10, 1932	IND Queens Boulevard Line (E ) Station is ADA-accessible in the southbound direction only.
Midtown	IND Queens Boulevard Line joins (E )					
Midtown	Disabled access	42nd Street–Port Authority Bus Terminal	all	A C E	September 10, 1932	IRT Broadway–Seventh Avenue Line (1 2 3 ) IRT Flushing Line (7 <7>); IRT 42nd Street Shuttle (S ) BMT Broadway Line (N Q R W ) at Times Square–42nd Street; IND Sixth Avenue Line (B D F <F> M ) at 42nd Street–Bryant Park, daytime only Port Authority Bus Terminal; M34A Select Bus Service
Midtown	Disabled access	34th Street–Penn Station	all	A C E	September 10, 1932	Penn Station: Amtrak, Long Island Rail Road, and New Jersey Transit; M34/M34A Select Bus Service
Chelsea		23rd Street	local	A C E	September 10, 1932	M23 Select Bus Service
Chelsea	Disabled access	14th Street	all	A C E	September 10, 1932	BMT Canarsie Line (L ) at Eighth Avenue
Greenwich Village	Disabled access	West Fourth Street–Washington Square	all	A C E	September 10, 1932	IND Sixth Avenue Line (B D F <F> M ) Connection to PATH at Ninth Street
local crossovers to/from IND Sixth Avenue Line (no regular service)
Hudson Square	↓	Spring Street	local	A C E	September 10, 1932	Station is ADA-accessible in the southbound direction only.
TriBeCa		Canal Street	all	A C E	September 10, 1932	
Financial District	Elevator access to mezzanine only	Chambers Street	express	A C	September 10, 1932	two parts of the same station; local tracks end BMT Broadway Line (N R W ) at Cortlandt Street; IRT Broadway–Seventh Avenue Line (2 3 ) at Park Place; Connection to PATH at World Trade Center
Financial District	Disabled access	World Trade Center	local	E	September 10, 1932	two parts of the same station; local tracks end BMT Broadway Line (N R W ) at Cortlandt Street; IRT Broadway–Seventh Avenue Line (2 3 ) at Park Place; Connection to PATH at World Trade Center
Financial District	Local tracks end					
Financial District	Disabled access	Fulton Street	express	A C	February 1, 1933	formerly Broadway–Nassau Street; IRT Broadway–Seventh Avenue Line (2 3 ) BMT Nassau Street Line (J Z ) IRT Lexington Avenue Line (4 5 ) Connection to PATH at World Trade Center
Brooklyn
continues through the Cranberry Street Tunnel
Brooklyn Heights		High Street	express	A C	June 24, 1933	This section of line opened on February 1, 1933; the station opened later.
Continues as the IND Fulton Street Line (A C ), with crossovers to/from the IND Culver Line (no regular service)
