= Nostrand Avenue (disambiguation) =

Nostrand Avenue may refer to:

- Nostrand Avenue, a major street in Brooklyn, New York City

== New York City Subway ==
=== Current stations ===
- Nostrand Avenue (IND Fulton Street Line), serving the A and C trains
- Nostrand Avenue (IRT Eastern Parkway Line), serving the 2, 3, 4, and 5 trains
- IRT Nostrand Avenue Line, serving the 2 and 5 trains

=== Former stations ===
- Nostrand Avenue (BMT Myrtle Avenue Line)
- Nostrand Avenue (BMT Fulton Street Line)
- Nostrand Avenue (BMT Lexington Avenue Line)

== Long Island Rail Road ==
- Nostrand Avenue (LIRR station)

== Other ==
- Nostrand Avenue Line (surface)
