= Troy Avenue station =

Former Fulton Street Line station in Brooklyn, New York

Troy Ave.

General information
- Location: Fulton Street & Troy Avenue; Weeksville, Bedford–Stuyvesant, Brooklyn, New York
- Coordinates: 40.679582°N 73.934947°W
- Line: BMT Fulton Street Line
- Platforms: 2 side platforms
- Tracks: 2

Construction
- Structure type: Elevated

History
- Opened: c. 1920s
- Closed: May 31, 1940; 85 years ago

Former services
Preceding station	BMT Lines	Following station
Tompkins Avenue toward Park Row or Fulton Ferry	13: Fulton Street Local	Reid Avenue toward Lefferts Avenue
Brooklyn Avenue One-way operation	13: Fulton Street Local	Reid Avenue toward Lefferts Avenue
Location

The Troy Avenue station was a station on the demolished BMT Fulton Street Line in Brooklyn, New York City. It had 2 tracks and 2 side platforms. It served trains of the BMT Fulton Street Line. Sometime between 1912 and 1924, the nearby Albany–Sumner Avenues station was closed due to the Dual Contracts addition of a third track between Nostrand Avenue and Hinsdale Street. Commuters from that station were redirected here. It was served by BMT 13 trains throughout its existence.

The next stop to the west of Reid Avenue was originally Sumner Avenue. In 1936, the Independent Subway System built their own Fulton Street subway but did not install a subway station at Troy Avenue. The nearest subway stations to replace the elevated station were Utica Avenue to the east and Kingston and Throop Avenues to the west. The elevated station became obsolete, and it closed on May 31, 1940.
