= Albany Avenue and Sumner Avenue stations =

Albany Ave. Sumner Ave.

General information
- Location: Fulton Street, Albany and Sumner Avenues, Bedford-Stuyvesant, Brooklyn, New York
- Coordinates: 40.679754°N 73.937844°W
- Line: BMT Fulton Street Line
- Platforms: 2 side platforms
- Tracks: 2
- Connections: Sumner Avenue Line

Construction
- Structure type: Elevated

History
- Opened: May 30, 1888; 138 years ago
- Closed: c.1920s
Location

Albany Avenue and Sumner Avenue was a station pair on the demolished BMT Fulton Street Line. It had 2 tracks and 2 side platforms. It was served by trains of the BMT Fulton Street Line. The station was opened on May 30, 1888, and had connections to the Sumner Avenue Line streetcars. Eastbound trains stopped at Albany Avenue, while westbound trains stopped at Sumner Avenue (now Marcus Garvey Boulevard). The next stop to the west was Tompkins Avenue. During 1912 and 1924, the Dual Contracts program installed a third track on the Fulton El between Nostrand Avenue and the new Hinsdale Street station. Albany–Sumner Avenues stations were closed during that time. The station was replaced by another station at Troy Avenue. In 1936 the Independent Subway System built an underground Fulton Street subway station at Kingston–Throop Avenues between here and the nearby Brooklyn–Tompkins Avenues Station. The el station became obsolete.
