= Sumner Avenue station =

Sumner Avenue station may refer to:

- Albany–Sumner Avenues (BMT Fulton Street Line), a station on the demolished BMT Fulton Street Line
- Sumner Avenue (BMT Lexington Avenue Line), a station on the demolished BMT Lexington Avenue Line
- Sumner Avenue (BMT Myrtle Avenue Line), a station on the demolished BMT Myrtle Avenue Line
