= Brooklyn Avenue and Tompkins Avenue stations =

Brooklyn Ave. Tompkins Ave.

General information
- Location: Fulton Street, Brooklyn and Tompkins Avenues, Bedford-Stuyvesant, Brooklyn, New York
- Coordinates: 40.680068°N 73.943691°W
- Line: BMT Fulton Street Line
- Platforms: 2 side platforms
- Tracks: 2
- Connections: Tompkins Avenue Line

Construction
- Structure type: Elevated

History
- Opened: May 30, 1888; 138 years ago
- Closed: May 31, 1940; 86 years ago

Former services
Preceding station	BMT Lines	Following station
Nostrand Avenue toward Park Row or Fulton Ferry	13: Fulton Street Local	Troy Avenue toward Lefferts Avenue
Location

Brooklyn Avenue and Tompkins Avenue was a station pair on the demolished BMT Fulton Street Line. It was originally opened on May 30, 1888, and had 2 tracks and 2 side platforms. It was served by trains of the BMT Fulton Street Line. Eastbound trains stopped at Brooklyn Avenue, while westbound trains stopped at Tompkins Avenue. The station had connections to the Tompkins Avenue Line streetcars. The next stop to the east was Albany Avenue, which was replaced by Troy Avenue at some point. The next stop to the west was Nostrand Avenue. In 1936, the Independent Subway System built an underground Fulton Street subway station at Kingston–Throop Avenues between here and the site of the former Albany–Sumner Avenues station. The elevated station became obsolete, and it closed on May 31, 1940.
