= HH (Court Street Shuttle) =

Former New York City Subway service

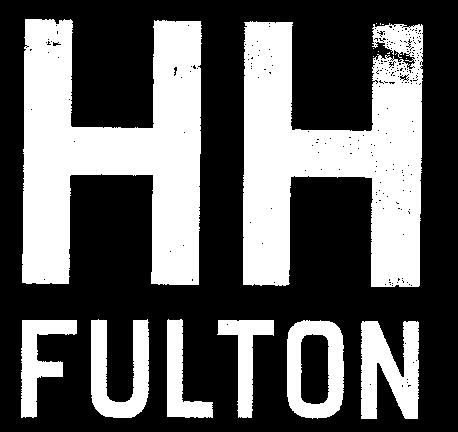
The HH rollsign

The HH was a shuttle route of the Independent Subway System of the New York City Subway in the 1930s to 1940s. It ran from Court Street to Hoyt–Schermerhorn Streets in Downtown Brooklyn until it was discontinued in 1946.

The letter was intended to be used for a service running local from Court Street to the then-unbuilt Euclid Avenue Station on the IND Fulton Street Line. Express service on the four-track line was to be provided by trains coming from Jay Street–Borough Hall and Manhattan. However, the HH was cut before this could happen.

== History ==
When service on the Fulton Street Line began on April 9, 1936, all trains serving it ran into Manhattan and the HH ran only as a two-stop shuttle to connect Court Street with Hoyt–Schermerhorn Streets. The HH ran on weekdays and Saturdays from 7 a.m. to 7 p.m. At that latter station, it stopped at the outermost tracks and platforms and connections to the Fulton Street and Crosstown trains were available.

Because the two stations the HH served were just three blocks apart in distance, it was discontinued on June 1, 1946, at 7 p.m. Since then, the two outermost tracks at Hoyt–Schermerhorn Streets have not been used in revenue service.

The Court Street station is now the site of the New York Transit Museum. The tracks leading to the station from the IND Fulton Street Line are still operable and are used to move trains to and from the exhibit.

== Route ==
Station service legend
Stops weekdays during the day	Stops during weekday daytime hours only
Time period details
Disabled access	Station is compliant with the Americans with Disabilities Act
↑	Station is compliant with the Americans with Disabilities Act in the indicated direction only
↓	Station is compliant with the Americans with Disabilities Act in the indicated direction only
	Elevator access to mezzanine only

	Stations	Subway transfers	Notes
Brooklyn
Stops weekdays during the day	Court Street		Now site of New York Transit Museum.
Stops weekdays during the day	Hoyt–Schermerhorn Streets	IND Fulton Street Line; IND Crosstown Line	
