= New York Transit Museum =

History museum in Brooklyn, New York

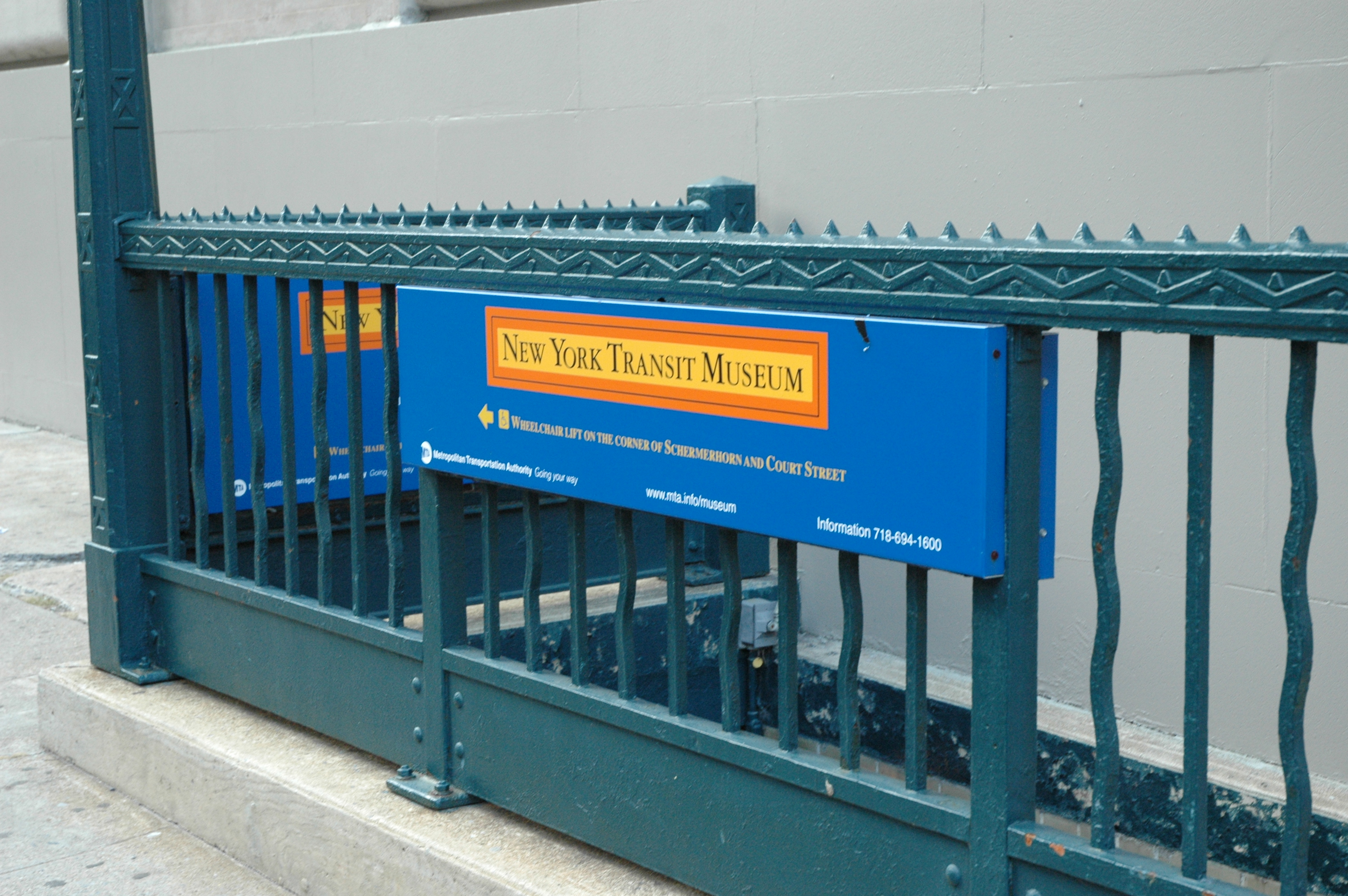
- Side view of the street entrance on the corner of Boerum Place and Schermerhorn Street
- Location: Former Court Street station, 99 Schermerhorn St, Brooklyn, NY 11201; United States
- Coordinates: 40.6904°N 73.9900°W
- Type: Railway and mass transit museum
- Accreditation: ASTC
- Public transit access: Bus: B25, B26, B38, B41, B45, B52, B57, B61, B62, B63, B65, B103; Subway: Court Street–Borough Hall Hoyt-Schermerhorn; Jay Street–MetroTech
- Website: www.nytransitmuseum.org

The New York Transit Museum (also called the NYC Transit Museum) is a museum that displays historical artifacts of the New York City Subway, bus, and commuter rail systems in the greater New York City metropolitan region. The main museum is located in the decommissioned Court Street subway station in Downtown Brooklyn and Brooklyn Heights in the New York City borough of Brooklyn. There is a smaller satellite Museum Annex in Grand Central Terminal in Midtown Manhattan. The museum is a self-supporting division of the Metropolitan Transportation Authority.

== Historic use as station ==
Court Street
- Former New York City Subway station
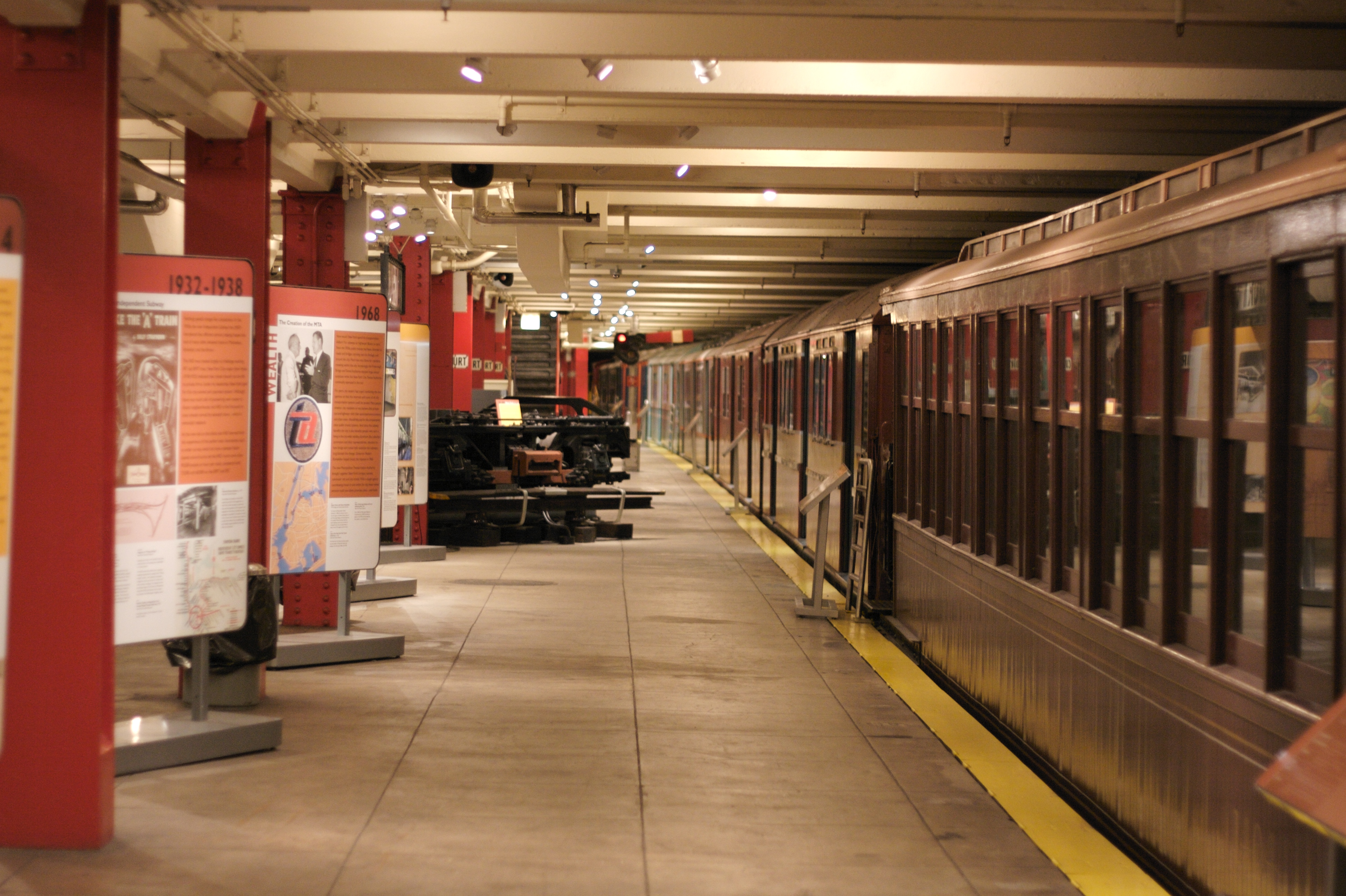
- Station platform with museum exhibits

Station statistics
- Address: Schermerhorn Street & Boerum Place; Brooklyn, NY 11201
- Borough: Brooklyn
- Locale: Downtown Brooklyn
- Coordinates: 40.6904°N 73.99°W
- Division
- Line: IND Fulton Street Line
- Services: None (currently occupied by museum)
- Structure: Underground
- Platforms: 1 island platform
- Tracks: 2

Other information
- Opened: April 9, 1936; 90 years ago
- Closed: June 1, 1946; 80 years ago (as a subway station)
- Accessible: Yes (station was not wheelchair accessible when it was in service)

Station succession
- Next north: (Terminal)
- Next south: Hoyt–Schermerhorn Streets
Location
Location within New York City Subway
Location within New York City
Location within New York
Track layout
Street map

The museum is located in an actual subway station, which was originally called Court Street. The Court Street station was built as a terminus for local trains of the IND Fulton Street Line and opened on April 9, 1936, along with a long section of the Fulton Street Line and the Rutgers Street Tunnel. The station has one center island platform with two tracks. The tracks end at bumper blocks just beyond the west end of the platform. The station walls feature a tile band set in a course two tiles high (as is the case with most IND local stations), colored aquamarine with a cerulean blue border. It is still a functioning subway station; trains are moved into and out of the exhibits using the tunnel between the station platforms and the outer tracks at Hoyt–Schermerhorn Street station (see below).

=== Service pattern and closure ===
The station exemplified the IND service theory and the design of most of the Manhattan trunk lines, which specified that local trains should operate within individual boroughs where possible, and provide transfers to express trains which would be through-routed between the boroughs. Court Street was to be the northern terminal of the HH Fulton Street Local, which would run south (geographically east) to Euclid Avenue. Additionally, one of the alternative plans for the Second Avenue Subway would have included a southern extension to Brooklyn, tying into the stub at Court Street to accommodate through service to and from Manhattan.

The HH through service was never inaugurated; the only trains to serve the station were part of the Court Street Shuttle portion of HH, taking passengers from Court Street to the transfer station at Hoyt–Schermerhorn Streets. Due to the proximity of other stations in the Downtown Brooklyn area, as well as the need to transfer to reach it, Court Street never saw much traffic and was abandoned on June 1, 1946. This saved about $19,903 a year; at the time of its closure, the shuttle earned $6,700 a year. Following the station's closure, most of the entrances to the street were sealed.

=== Abandonment ===
While the station was closed to the public, non-revenue trains would occasionally run to and from the station, with the purpose of "keeping the rails polished". On March 15, 1960, the New York City Transit Authority tested a new cleaning process on the walls of the Court Street station, which had been stained after years without use. There were also plans to convert the abandoned station into a bowling alley in 1961, but these were not carried out. Meanwhile, the sealed but still-present station entrances became dumping grounds for garbage.

The station was also used as a set for movies. Three years after its closing in 1949, the station was used for the filming of the film Guilty Bystander. On November 26, 1956, the station was used to film a scene of The FBI Story, posing as the Bowling Green station. By the 1960s, the station was being used for numerous films every year; for instance, the station was a filming location for nine films in 1964, thirteen in 1965, and twenty-two in 1966. The Taking of Pelham One Two Three (1974) was among the films that used the station as a filming location. After the museum opened, the station continued to be used as a set for movies. The museum remains open to requests to use the station for filming, as well as to host private events during hours the facility is not normally open.

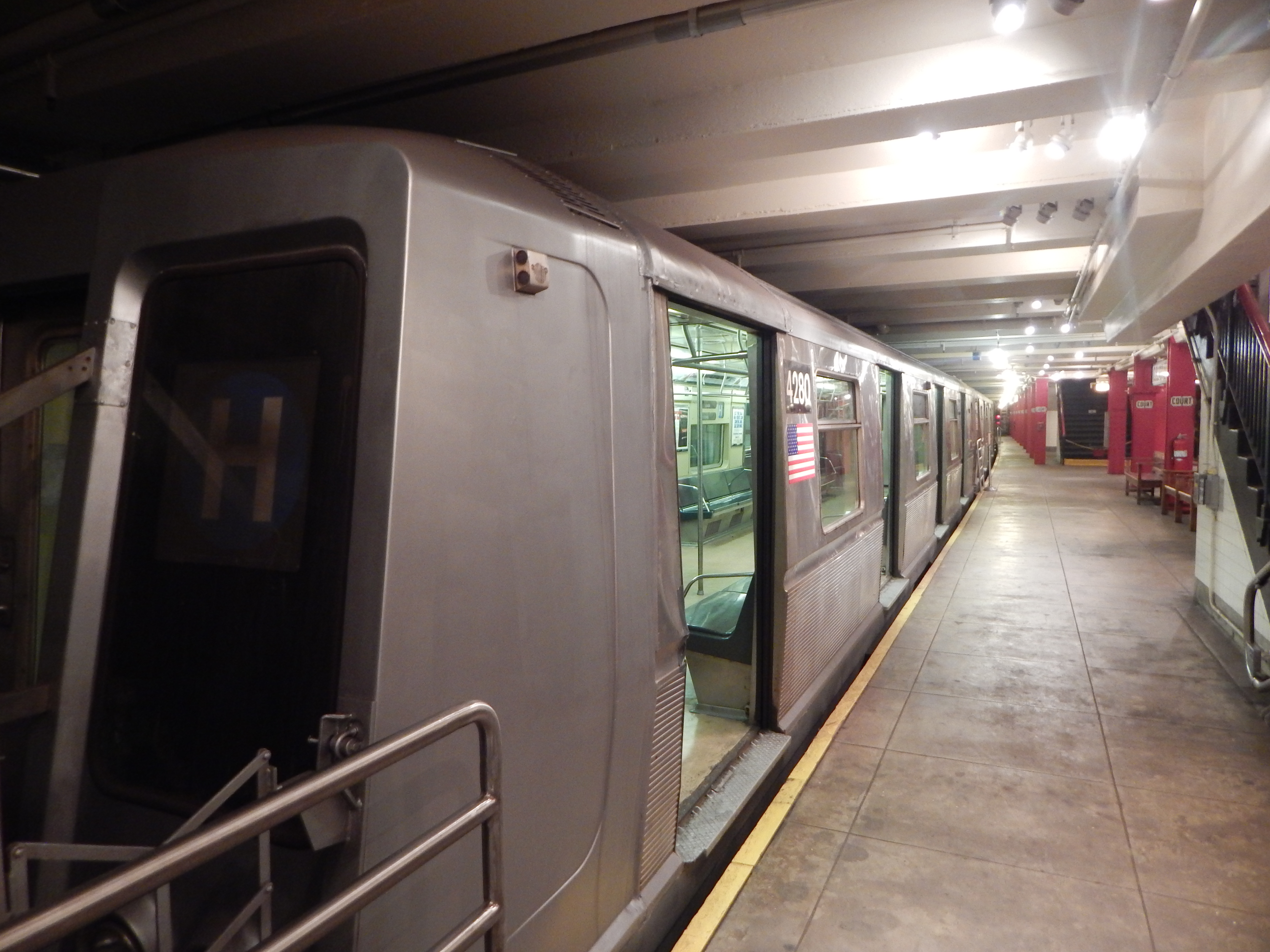
Looking down the platform

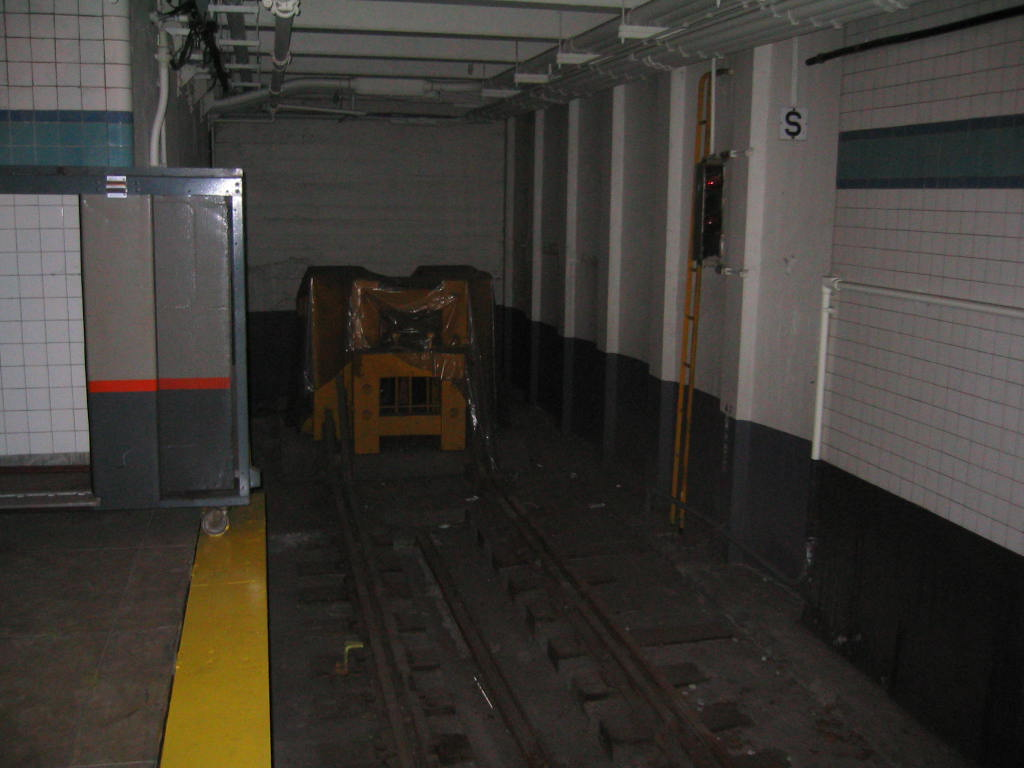
Bumper block at end of Track A2

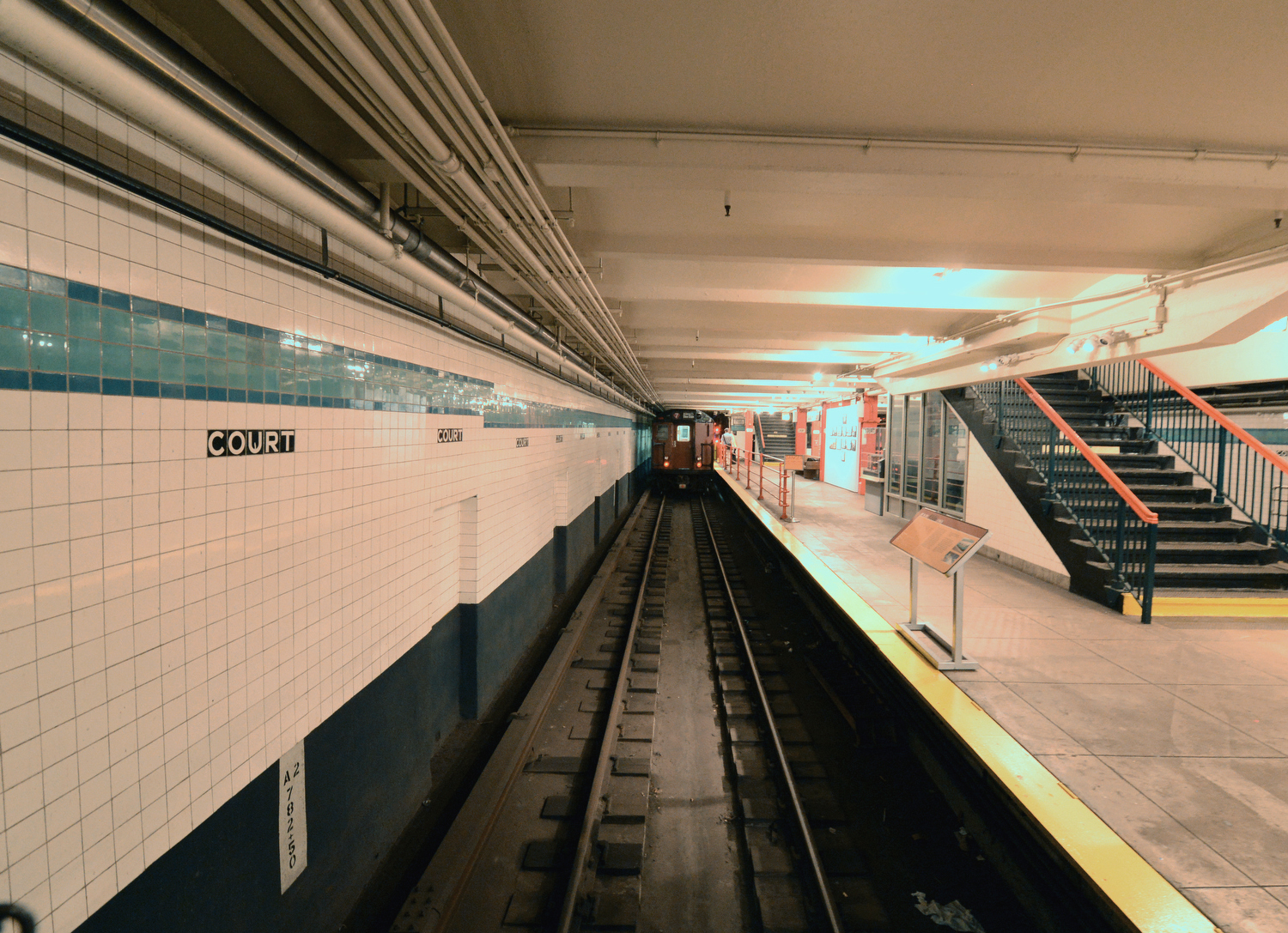
View down Track A2, on a rare occasion when displayed railcars are being rearranged

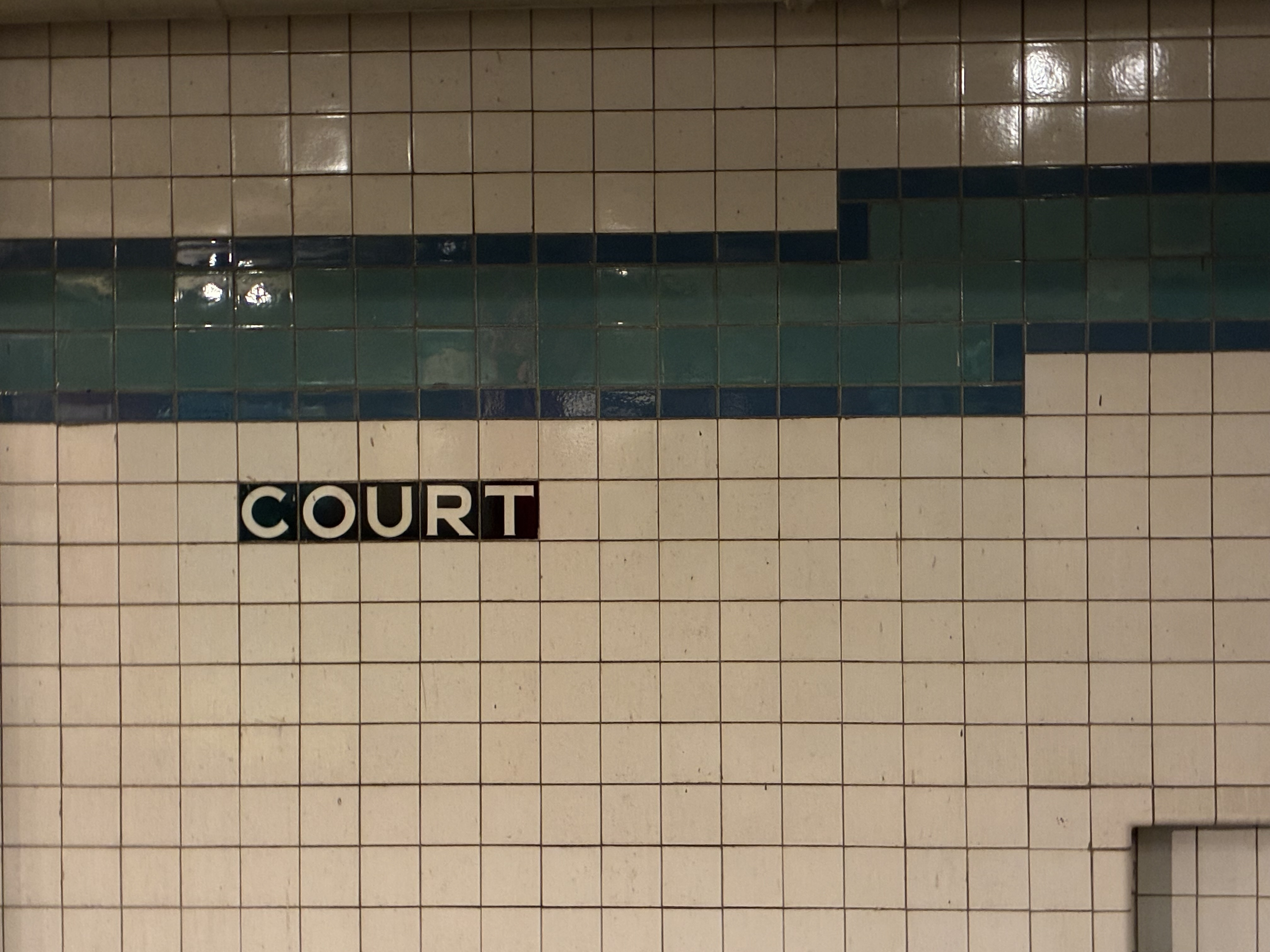
A photo of artwork. It shows its trimming and name mosaic.

=== Station layout ===
The station was a two-track, one-island platformed station while in service. The Transit Museum's main entrance is located at the corner of Boerum Place and Schermerhorn Street in downtown Brooklyn. An ADA-accessible chair lift and elevator were added after the station was converted into a museum. The wheelchair lift is located at Court and Schermerhorn Streets, but unlike the elevators in operational New York City Subway stations, must be accessed by requesting it in advance or using a call button.

== Exhibits and programs ==
On July 4, 1976, the New York City Transit Exhibit was opened in the decommissioned underground station as part of the United States Bicentennial celebration, charging a fee of one subway token for admittance. Old subway cars which had been preserved, as well as models and other exhibits were displayed. Plans were to keep the museum open until September 7 of that year, but it proved to be so popular that it remained open and eventually became a permanent museum. On weekends during its initial opening, museum nostalgia trains would run between 57th Street − Sixth Avenue and Rockaway Park, making an intermittent hour-long stop at the exhibit.

In the mid-1990s the Metropolitan Transportation Authority (MTA) assumed control of the Transit Museum from the New York City Transit Authority. At that time, the scope of the museum was expanded to include other aspects of transportation services within the MTA region, including commuter rail (Metro-North, Staten Island Railway, Long Island Rail Road) and roads, tunnels, and bridges (MTA Bridges and Tunnels). Since then, rotating exhibits on the mezzanine level frequently highlight commuter railroad and bridge/tunnel operations, as well as their history.

The museum includes subway, bus, railway, bridge, and tunnel memorabilia; and other exhibits including vintage signage and in-vehicle advertisements; and models and dioramas of subway, bus, and other equipment. A program of lectures, seminars, films, and tours for all ages is offered at the museum. In addition, offsite programs consist of guided tours of MTA facilities, subway stations, artwork and architecture, and New York neighborhoods, as well as opportunities to ride vintage railway and bus equipment.

The museum's mezzanine (upper) level contains the majority of the exhibits, restrooms, water fountains, and a gift shop. Artifacts from historic subway and bus operations, as well as NYC transportation infrastructure, are on display. The exhibits on the upper level are changed from time to time. In addition, there is a small presentation screening room which usually displays posters and videos for public education about courtesy and safety, including examples from other transit systems around the world.

In addition to its own exhibit spaces, the museum occasionally collaborates with other local organizations, such as the Coney Island Museum, to jointly present historical or contemporary shows, such as Five Cents To Dreamland: A Trip to Coney Island.

=== Railway artifacts ===
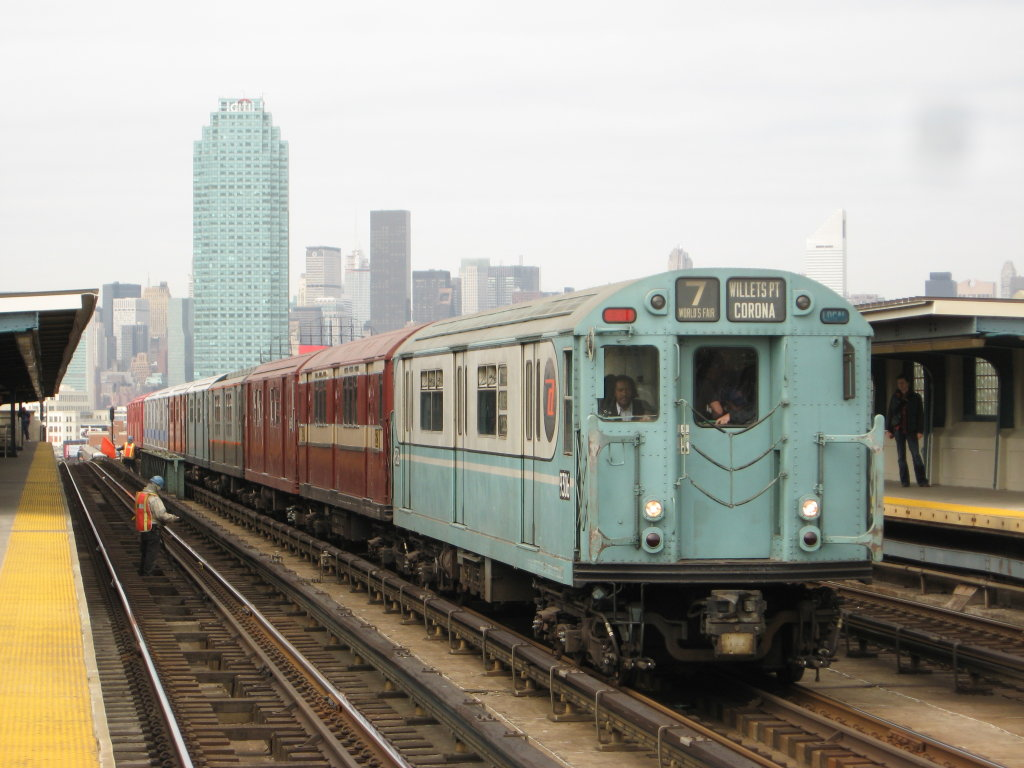
Special "Train of Many Colors" excursions are organized by the New York Transit Museum

On the platform lower level, two fully powered and operational subway tracks contain many historic examples of New York City subway and elevated railway equipment on permanent display. Preserved railcars, most of which can still be operated, date as far back as the predecessor companies that came before the New York City Transit Authority, such as the BMT and IRT private companies, and the city owned and operated IND. The platform bordering one of the two tracks is equipped with hinged bright yellow gap filler boards, to allow the narrower IRT railcars to be safely boarded from a platform which was built for the wider cars running on newer lines.

A few specialized railwork vehicles formerly used for maintenance are also usually on view. In addition to the operational rolling stock, there is a large wheel truck and motor (bogie) on display on the platform itself, along with a series of informational panels showing the development of New York City's rail transit systems.

In addition, a fully functional underground "signal tower" control room is on view, a facility that was used to monitor the IND Fulton Street Line and IND Crosstown Line when the subway station was in active revenue service. The track diagram indicator lights and control levers are fully operational, and are still needed when the subway cars on display are replaced or moved; however, since the controls are live, the control panel is secured and locked, but visitors can still view it through a window and read explanatory signs.

Other artifacts in the museum include a poster for the 1926 lost film, Subway Sadie, as well as an original brass light fixture from the station's operating days. It also features an original mosaic plaque from the 137th Street station, dating back to the subway's 1904 opening.

=== Bus fleet and artifacts ===
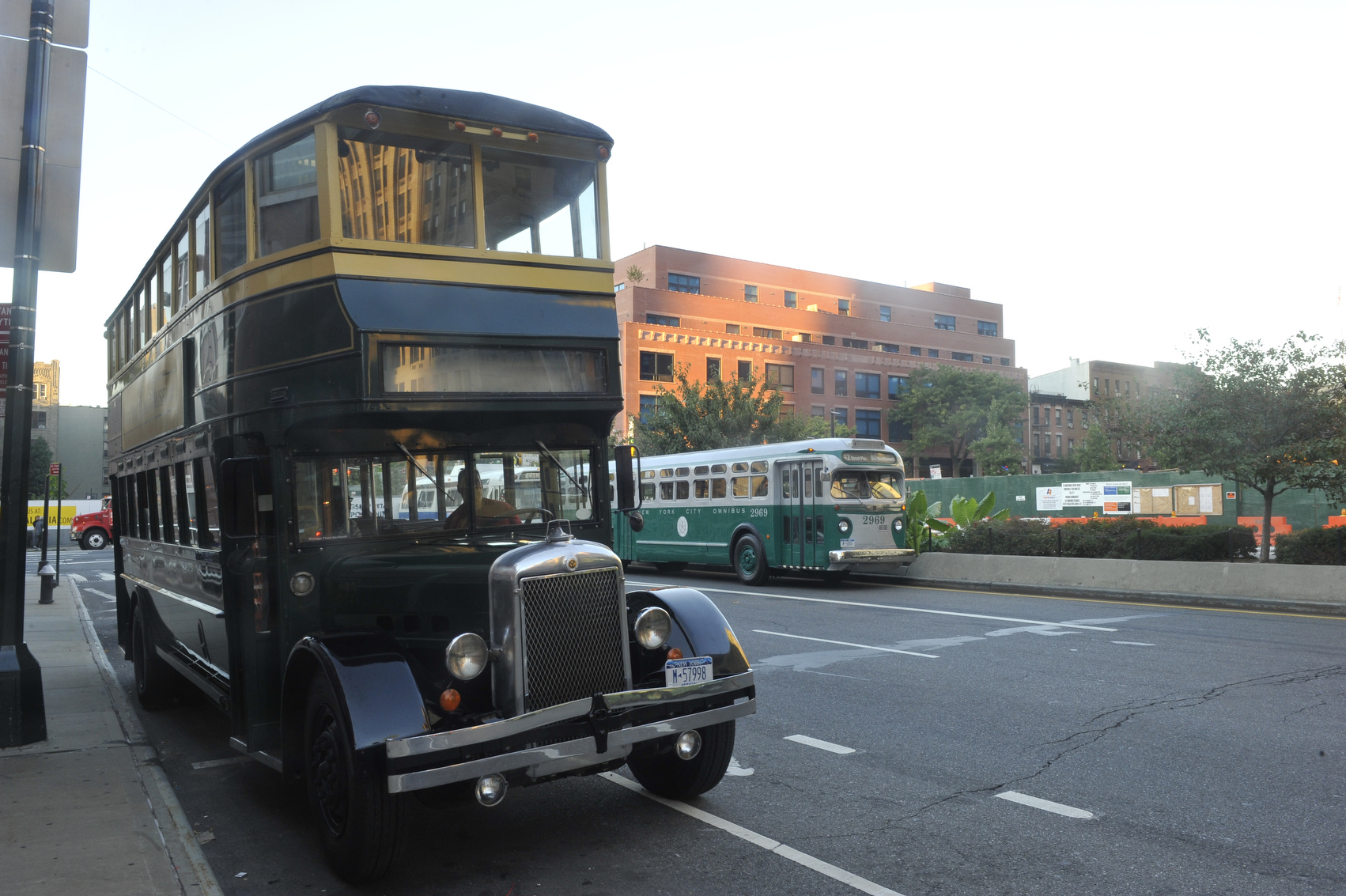
The annual Bus Festival is an occasion to exhibit working historic buses, such as this double-decker

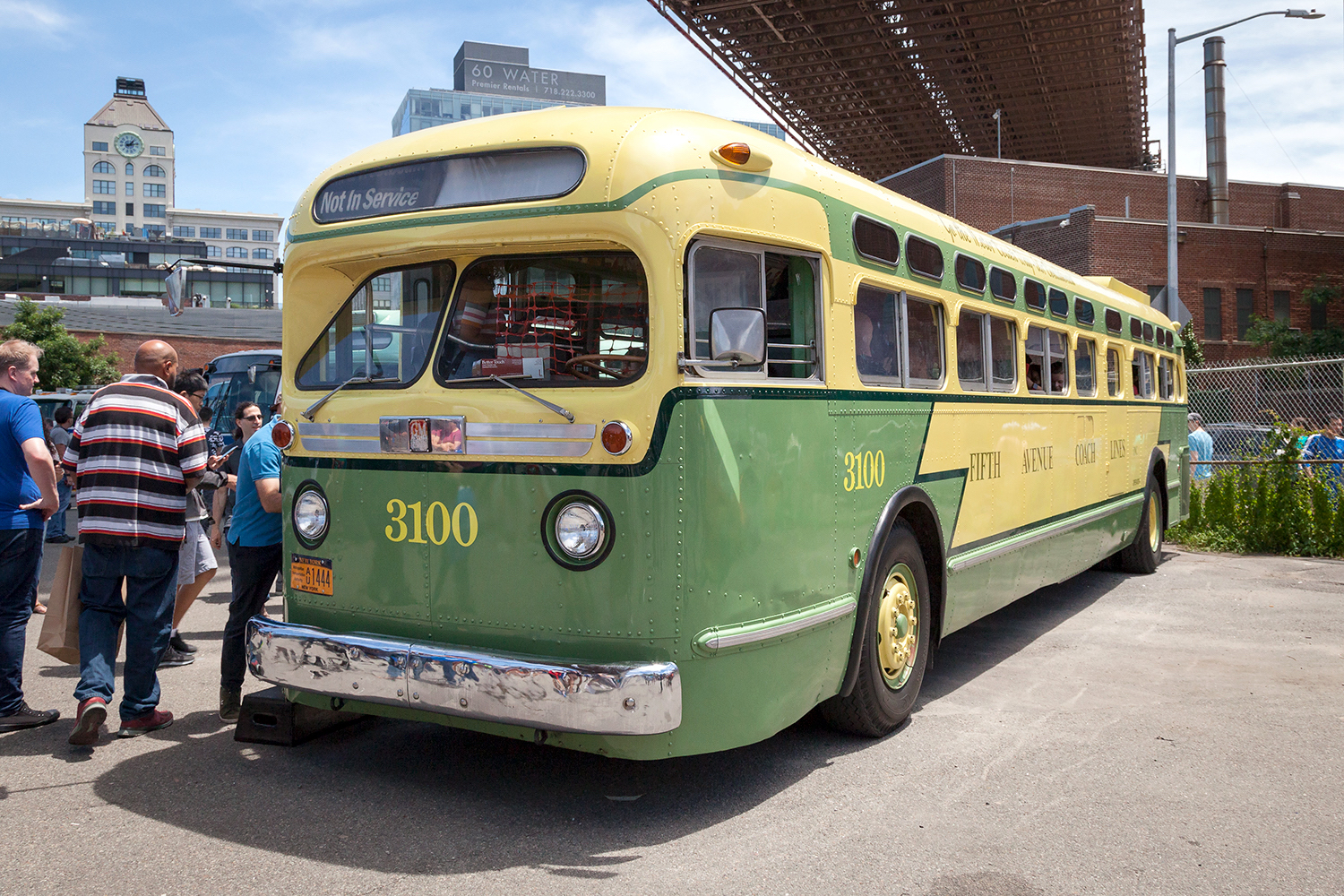
The 26th Annual Bus Festival in Brooklyn Bridge Park

Besides subway cars, the museum has a sizable vintage bus fleet of retired buses. Because there is no area available for their permanent exhibition in the underground museum, they are stored in various bus depots around the city. They are brought out for special events, such as the museum's annual "Bus Festival," which is held annually in conjunction with the Atlantic Antic street fair. The Bus Festival began as an annual tradition in 1994. During the Bus Festival, the museum opens its doors for free.

The bus fleet includes:

- #3100 (built 1956) was the first air-conditioned bus in use in any American transportation system. An experimental bus of the Fifth Avenue Coach Company, it had rear exit doors that passengers pushed to open; seats wrapping around the back of the bus; soft seats; and fluorescent lights. It last saw passenger service in the mid-1970s, having been used later for the New York City Transit Police.
- #236 (built 1980) was the first of the advanced design - high-tech bus for its age, having wheelchair-accessible lifts and electronic marquees. The fleet had many mechanical/structural problems and was pulled from service after four years.
- #2969 (originally #4789; built 1948) was custom-made for the city's transit system and was one of the first 40-foot (12 m) buses. Its front door was twice as wide as other buses' front doors at the time. It was renumbered after the bus that Jackie Gleason's character in The Honeymooners, Ralph Kramden, was pictured in.
- #3865 (built 1993) was operated by Queens Surface Corporation during its first years of service, but in May 2000, the bus became under the operation of Jamaica Buses. Twelve of the former Queens Surface buses (including #3865) replaced some 1980s-era buses that Jamaica Buses operated.
- #100 (built 1959) was a "New Look" bus built by GMC. In total, 190 "New Look" buses operated in New York City. Each had a curved windshield with a one-piece overhead route sign and windows shaped like parallelograms.
- #621 (built 1979) was a "Fishbowl" bus built by General Motors of Canada and one of ten such buses used in New York City until the 1990s.
- #3006 (built 1988) was a "Classic" bus operated by Liberty Lines Transit and used from 1982 to 2006.
- #1502 (built 1982) was a "New Look" bus. The 25 buses were operated by New York Bus Service. These buses had seats that faced forward; overhead racks and lights; and one door at the front.
- #5227 (built 1971 and rebuilt 1985) was one of 350 "New Look" buses that were rebuilt in Chicago. The buses, which had hard, blue lengthwise seating, were the last NYCT buses without a wheelchair lift.
- #1201 (built 1981) was one of ultimately 4,877 Rapid Transit Series buses used by the MTA Regional Bus Operations companies from 1981 to 1999. These buses all had wheelchair lifts, making MTA the first agency in the United States to have a fully accessible bus fleet.
- #8928 (built 1969) was one of 133 buses that replaced an earlier, 1956 fleet. Thirteen buses were operated on Staten Island express buses and were later used as buses between John F. Kennedy International Airport and the JFK Express at Howard Beach–JFK Airport.

Some bus artifacts are present in the station. A revenue bag, one of many provided for use for bus drivers with the Third Avenue Transit Corporation, was used during the 1950s to transport money out of the buses. It is part of the interactive "Show Me the Money: From the Turnstile to the Bank" exhibit, where visitors could "see an image of the vacuum that attaches to the fare box and sucks the coins out."

== Current exhibits ==
As of 2017, the museum features a number of exhibits:

- "Steel, Stone & Backbone: Building New York's Subways" highlights the challenges and labor involved in subway construction during the period 1900–1925.
- "Moving the Millions" chronicles the history of the subway system from the private operators to the MTA New York City Transit of today. Located on the platform level, it is designed to supplement a visitor's experience exploring the various subway cars on display in the museum.
- "Fare Collection" explains different methods New Yorkers have used to pay subway fare over the years, and displays authentic subway turnstiles which visitors can traverse. In addition, there is a small display of the various token designs that were used in the past before they were completely discontinued.
- "On the Streets" exhibits a comprehensive history of New York City's street transportation (horsecars, cable cars, streetcars, buses, etc.), as well as two bus installations visitors can sit in, including the driver's seat.
- "Clearing the Air" discusses modern street transportation and its impact on the environment, and highlights steps that the MTA is taking to reduce its carbon footprint.
- "Stop Look and Listen" allows visitors to enter a working subway signal tower dating from 1936, to see how trains are kept a safe distance apart and supervised.
- "Bringing Back The City: Mass Transit Responds To Crisis" explains planning and emergency services, and their role in preventing or recovering from service disruptions.
- "No Spitting on the Platform" displays historic way-finding and etiquette signage.
- "Dr. George T.F. Rahilly Trolley and Bus Study Center" displays over 50 scale models of streetcars and work cars, with a focus on Brooklyn.

=== Turnstiles and fare collection ===
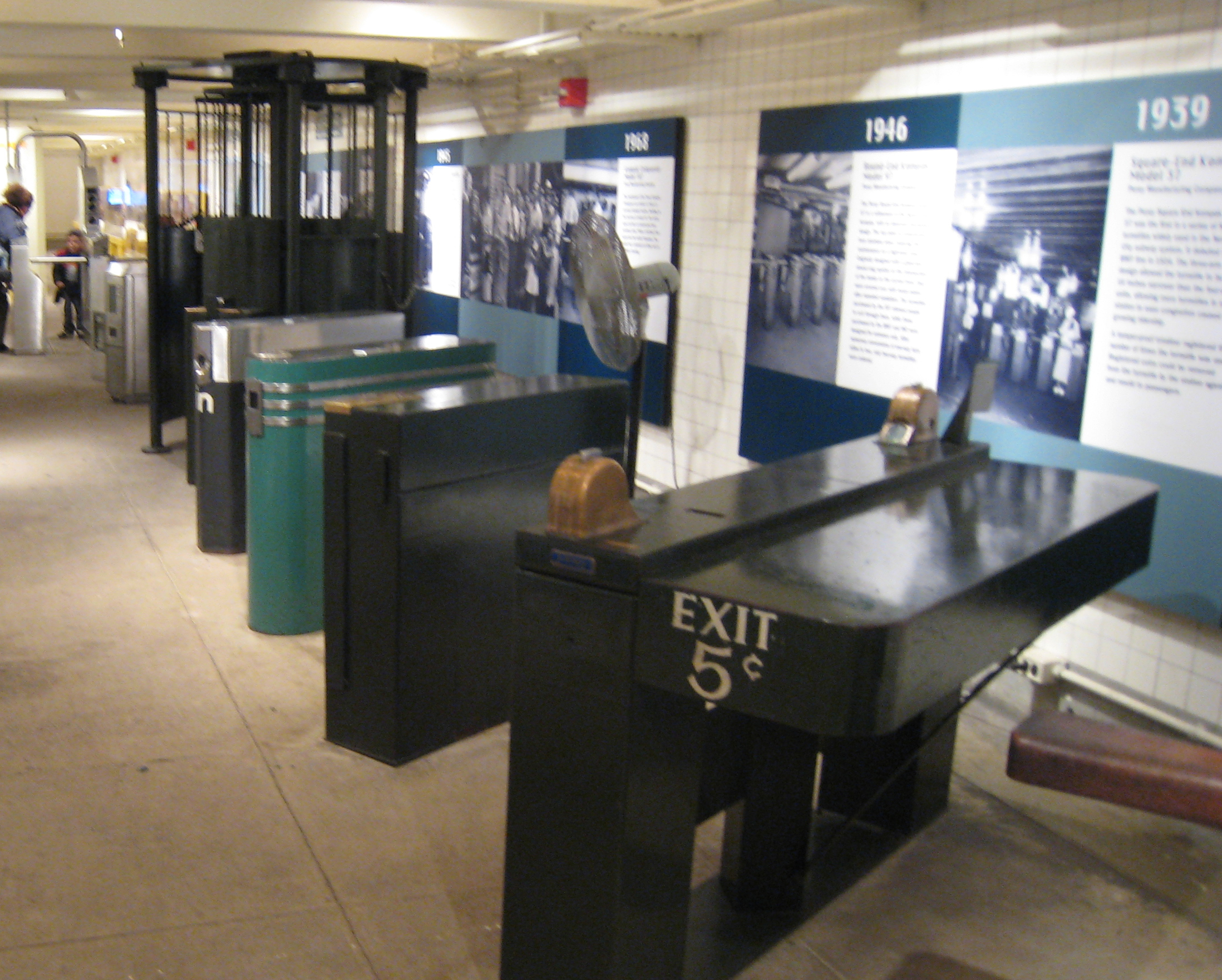
An array of historic subway turnstiles

Various turnstiles from the history of subways are on display at the New York Transit Museum. They date as far back as the subway's opening in 1904, up through turnstiles that were still in use as recently as 2003. The exhibit includes many different types of turnstiles, including turnstiles used during the 1939 New York World's Fair that were designed to require passengers to pay a special double fare both upon entering and exiting the World's Fair subway station. The exhibit is designed to be interactive and to be viewed in conjunction with a large board that details the history of fare payment in the subway. Most of the turnstiles can be walked through by visitors.

=== Rolling stock ===
Most of the subway cars in the Transit Museum's fleet are operable, and they are frequently used for subway excursions run by the museum and New York City Transit on various parts of the system. The subway cars are fully furnished with vintage advertising placards and route maps, completing the period atmosphere inside the vehicles. Tickets for Transit Museum excursions (called "Nostalgia Trains") are sold in advance. Some New York City Transit special trains (such as Holiday specials at the end of most years, and Yankee/Met specials) are available for anyone to ride, so long as they have paid the regular subway fare. In addition to the subway cars displayed in the Transit Museum, there are also a number of museum cars that are kept off-site in various subway yards and shops while awaiting restoration, undergoing restoration, or in storage.

The following cars are displayed in the museum as of June 22, 2025:

Track A1 (Front to back)
Name	Image	Manufacturer	Year built	Retired	Notes
R110B 3007		Bombardier	1992	1996	Only of its class in a museum
R1 100		American Car & Foundry	1931	Late 1960s-Mid 1970s	First R1-9 car produced
R7A 1575		American Car & Foundry	1938	1970s	Prototype car for the R10 fleet
R4 401		American Car & Foundry	1932	Late 1960s-Mid 1970s	Contains 2 side doors from R1 175
BMT D-type Triplex 6095A-B-C		Pressed Steel	1925	1965	Operational since 2015
BRT AB Standard 2204		American Car & Foundry	1915	1960s	None
R30 8506		St. Louis	1960	1975	Sent for preservation after its mate suffered an accident, leading it to be never refurbished
R44 5240		St. Louis	1971	2010	Only of its class in a museum

Track A2 (Front to back)
Name	Image	Manufacturer	Year built	Retired	Notes
BRT BU Gated El Cars 1273, 1404 & 1407		Jewett, Laconia & Pressed Steel	1904	1969 (Likely)	Converted to the Q Type then back to BU Cars
BMT Q-Type El Car 1612C		Multiple manufacturers	1938	1969	Converted from the BU Gate Cars
R33S 9306		St. Louis	1963	1976	Held for preservation by the NYTM, hence the reason it was never refurbished
R33S 9310	N/A	St. Louis	1963	2003	Currently in a Redbird livery
R12 5760		American Car and Foundry	1948	1976	Held for preservation by the NYTM; painted in the original R12 livery
R15 6239		American Car and Foundry	1950	1976	Held for preservation by the NYTM; painted in the original R15 livery
Standard Lo-V 4902		American Car and Foundry or Pressed Steel	1916	1969	Held for preservation
IND R3 56	N/A	N/A	N/A	N/A	Pump car
Long Island Rail Road Caboose C-60		International Railway Car Co.	1961	N/A	Only piece of LIRR equipment at the museum
SBK Steeplecab 5		ALCO & GE	1910	1976	Oldest locomotive in the museum fleet
35-Ton single truck Diesel Locomotive 10		GE	1959	N/A	Operational

There are many cars not on display, but rather, are used on special fan excursions and other events. Most are based at 207 Street or Coney Island Yard. The rolling stock not on display include:

Infobox
Name	Image	Manufacturer	Year built	Retired	Notes
AB Standard 2390-2392		American Car and Foundry or Pressed Steel	1915	1969	All operational
Standard Lo-V 5290, 5292, 5443 & 5483		American Car and Foundry or Pressed Steel	1916	1969	All operational
SBK Steeplecab 5	N/A	GE	1921	N/A	Very similar if not the same as SBK 5
BMT D-Type Triplex 6019A-B-C	N/A	Pressed Steel	1925	1965	Stored at Pitkin Yard
BMT D-Type Triplex 6112A-B-C		Pressed Steel	1925	1965	Operational
R1 103	N/A	American Car and Foundry	1931	Late 1960s-Mid 1970s	Features experimental axiflow-type fans
R1 381	N/A	American Car and Foundry	1931	Late 1960s-Mid 1970s	Operational
R4 484		American Car and Foundry	1932	1970s	Retrofitted with experimental lighting and a PA system
R6-3 923 & 925	N/A	American Car and Foundry	1935	1970s	In storage at 207th Street Yard
R6-3 1000		American Car and Foundry	1935	1970s	Operational
R6-1 1300		Pressed Steel	1936	1970s	Operational
IRT WF Lo-V 5655		St. Louis	1938	1969	In storage; only in its class preserved
R9 1802		Pressed Steel	1940	1970s	Last R1-9 built
R10 3184		American Car and Foundry	1948	1989	Oldest NYCT SMEE car preserved; painted in its original R10 livery
R10 3189		American Car and Foundry	1948	1984	Operational; painted in its 1960s bluebird livery. Was a former school car from 1984-2017
R12 5782		American Car and Foundry	1948	Late 1970s-Early 1980s	In storage at 207th Street Yard; formerly a FDNY training car
R11/R34 8013		Budd Company	1949	1977	Operational; only in its class preserved
R14 5871		American Car and Foundry	1948	Late 1970s-Early 1980s	In storage at 207th Street Yard; formerly a FDNY training car
R16 6305 & 6339		American Car and Foundry	1955	Late 1970s-Late 1980s	In storage at Coney Island Yard
R16 6387		American Car and Foundry	1955	Late 1970s-Late 1980s	Operational; painted in its 1960s olive green livery
R17 6609		St. Louis	1955	1976	Operational; notable for being used in the film The French Connection
R21 7194		St. Louis	1956	2006	Converted to a revenue collection car (Money train)
R21 7203		St. Louis	1956	1980s	Stored at Coney Island Yard; notable for being used in the film Money Train
R22 7422		St. Louis	1957	2006	Converted to a revenue collection car (Money train)
R26 7774-7775		American Car and Foundry	1959	2002	In storage at Concourse Yard
R28 7924-7925		American Car and Foundry	1960	2002	In storage at Concourse Yard
R29/R99 8678-8679		St. Louis	1960	2002	In storage at Concourse Yard
R30 8481 & 8522	N/A	St. Louis	1960	1993	In storage at 207th Street Yard
R33 9010-9011		St. Louis	1962	2003	Operational; painted in the 1970s silver & blue scheme
R33 9016-9017	N/A	St. Louis	1962	2003	Operational; painted in the 1960s Red Robin scheme
R33 9068-9069 & 9206-9207		St. Louis	1962	2003	Operational; painted in the Redbird scheme
R33S 9307 & 9308	N/A	St. Louis	1963	2003	Operational; painted in the Bluebird scheme
R33S 9343	N/A	St. Louis	1963	2003	Operational; painted in an unknown scheme
R36ML 9542-9543		St. Louis	1963	2003	Operational
R36WF 9582-9585	N/A	St. Louis	1963	2003	In storage
R36WF 9586-9587		St. Louis	1963	2003	Operational
R32 Phase II 3350-3351	N/A	Budd Company	1964	2008	Operational
R32 Phase II 3352-3353	N/A	Budd Company	1964	2008	In storage
R32 Phase I 3354-3355	N/A	Budd Company	1964	2020	Preserved for film use; stored at Coney Island Yard
R32 Phase I 3360-3361		Budd Company	1964	2022	Retrofitted to look like the original R32
R32 Phase I 3646–3647, 3888–3889, 3894–3895 & 3938–3939		Budd Company	1964	2020 (3938-39), 2022 (The rest)	Preserved for film use; all operational
R38 4028-4029		St. Louis	1966	2009	Operational; only in its class preserved
R40 Slant 4280-4281		St. Louis	1968	2009	In storage at 207th Street Yard
R40A Modified 4480-4481	N/A	St. Louis	1969	2009	In storage at 207th Street Yard
R40A Modified 4460 & R42 4665	N/A	St. Louis	1969	2009	Both pairs mated due to an accident. In storage at Coney Island Yard
R44 5286-5289	N/A	St. Louis	1971	2010	In storage at Coney Island Yard

== Past exhibits ==
Some exhibits no longer on view include:

- "ElectriCity: Powering New York's Rails", an interactive exhibit of the various types of electric power generation, how it gets to the subway, and how electric motors work.
- "Show Me the Money: From the Turnstile to the Bank", which explained the old (pre-2006) process of revenue collection in the New York City Subway via money trains, cloth "money bags", and a sewing machine used to create them.

No longer on view in the "Fare Collection" exhibit are several token vending machines that were used to sell subway tokens prior to the advent of the MetroCard.

Other previous exhibits have included surveys of historic subway maps, artwork, signage, and mosaics. A refrigerator-sized plug-in circuit breaker, a complete relay-based classic electric motor controller, and numerous other artifacts that highlight topics such as subway signaling and control, electrical power, and railway infrastructure are no longer on view at the platform (lower) level.

== Grand Central Gallery Annex and Store ==
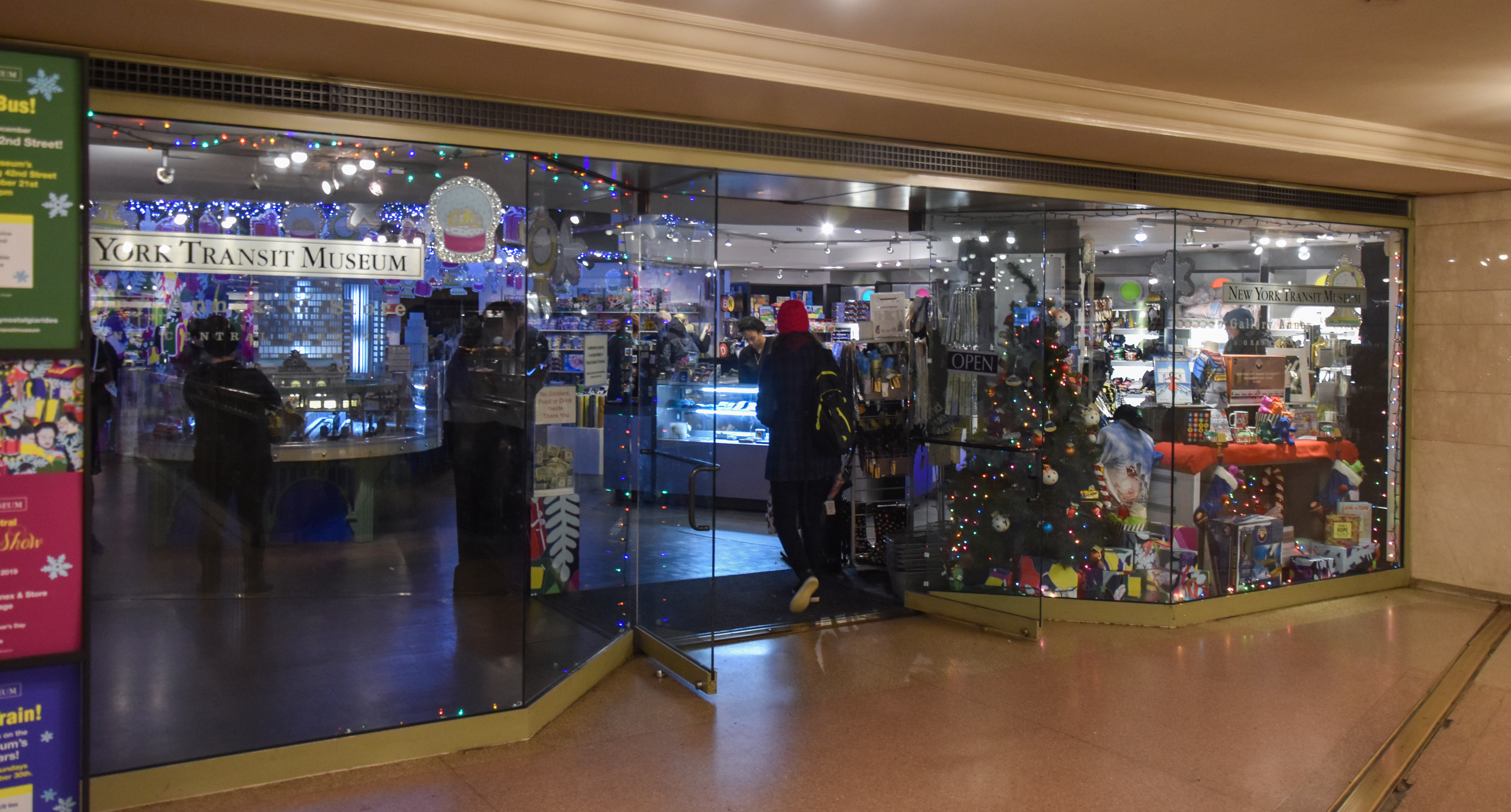
Grand Central Terminal Gallery Annex and Store

The New York Transit Museum Gallery Annex and Store opened on September 14, 1993, at Grand Central Terminal, in the terminal's main concourse. It houses a transit-oriented gift shop as well as a space for rotating temporary exhibitions. The Annex is the site of the Transit Museum's annual Holiday Train Show, where an operating model train layout is displayed for the public. While there is an admission fee at the Transit Museum's main Brooklyn Heights location, entrance to the Annex is free. The main Brooklyn Heights location also has its own gift shop, which is accessible outside of the museum's paid area. An additional gift store is available within the headquarters of the MTA, at 2 Broadway in Lower Manhattan.

== Archives ==
Documents, photographs, and artifacts are stored both in the Transit Museum and in the nearby Archives, adding to the goal of preserving the legacy of transportation in New York. Historians and researchers who wish to visit the Archives are able to do so through the museum. Some objects from the museum's archive can be viewed on the New York Transit Museum's Online Collections platform. Some images from their collection can also be seen on Historypin.

== See also ==
- List of museums and cultural institutions in New York City
