= Murder of Rashawn Brazell =

Unsolved murder case of an American man

Rashawn Brazell
- Born: April 15, 1985; Brooklyn, New York City, U.S.
- Died: February 14, 2005 (aged 19); Brooklyn, New York City, U.S.
- Cause of death: Homicide
- Body discovered: February 18, 2005
- Known for: Victim of unsolved murder

In late February 2005, the dismembered body parts of 19-year-old Rashawn Brazell were found in garbage bags strewn throughout the New York City borough of Brooklyn after he disappeared from his home in the Bushwick neighborhood. He had left in the morning of February 14 to meet his accountant and then meet his mother for lunch in Manhattan. At 7:30 that morning, an unknown person rang the apartment building's security buzzer and Brazell went down to meet him. According to other witnesses, Brazell met a man outside his Brooklyn apartment and the two men entered the subway together at the Gates Avenue station. Witnesses believe the two exited at the Nostrand Avenue station in Bedford–Stuyvesant a short time later. Brazell was never seen alive again.

== Discovery of body ==
On February 17 a male torso, legs and one arm were found by transit workers inside of double-bagged blue and black trash bags in an A line subway tunnel between the Nostrand Avenue and Franklin Avenue stations. The bags had been left between the southbound tracks and the tunnel wall, near an emergency exit with two flights of stairs leading to the street above. A black and beige, “Rooster” tool bag with the victim’s blood on the tools inside was found a few feet away. This bag was one of only 15 made as prototypes and sold exclusively to the Metropolitan Transportation Authority in 2001, which, taken together with the location of the remains, led police to believe that the culprit was someone highly familiar with the subway tunnels. Fingerprinting positively identified the remains as Rashawn Brazell. On February 23 and 24 an arm and hand, also identified as Brazell's, were found inside of double-bagged blue and black trash bags at the Humboldt Street recycling plant in Greenpoint, Brooklyn.

Rashawn's head was never found. The New York City Police Department searched around the country for clues; America's Most Wanted profiled the case and ran the segment several times.

== Investigation and aftermath ==
A break in the case came in 2017. The police arrested Kwauhuru Govan, Brazell's cousin and former neighbor, who had a criminal history predating 2005. He had since moved to Florida and was imprisoned there in 2014 on an armed robbery conviction. Govan was charged with Brazell's murder. After DNA linked him to another unsolved Brooklyn homicide, he was extradited to New York and charged with the killing of Sharabia Thomas. Govan was convicted of Thomas' murder in 2018. Detectives who asked Govan about the Brazell case claim that he made false and evasive statements. They charged him with the crime on that basis and other evidence, and they suspect he might be a serial killer.

== See also ==
- Crime in New York City
- List of solved missing person cases (2000s)
