= Hoyt–Schermerhorn Streets station =

New York City Subway station in Brooklyn

Hoyt–Schermerhorn Streets
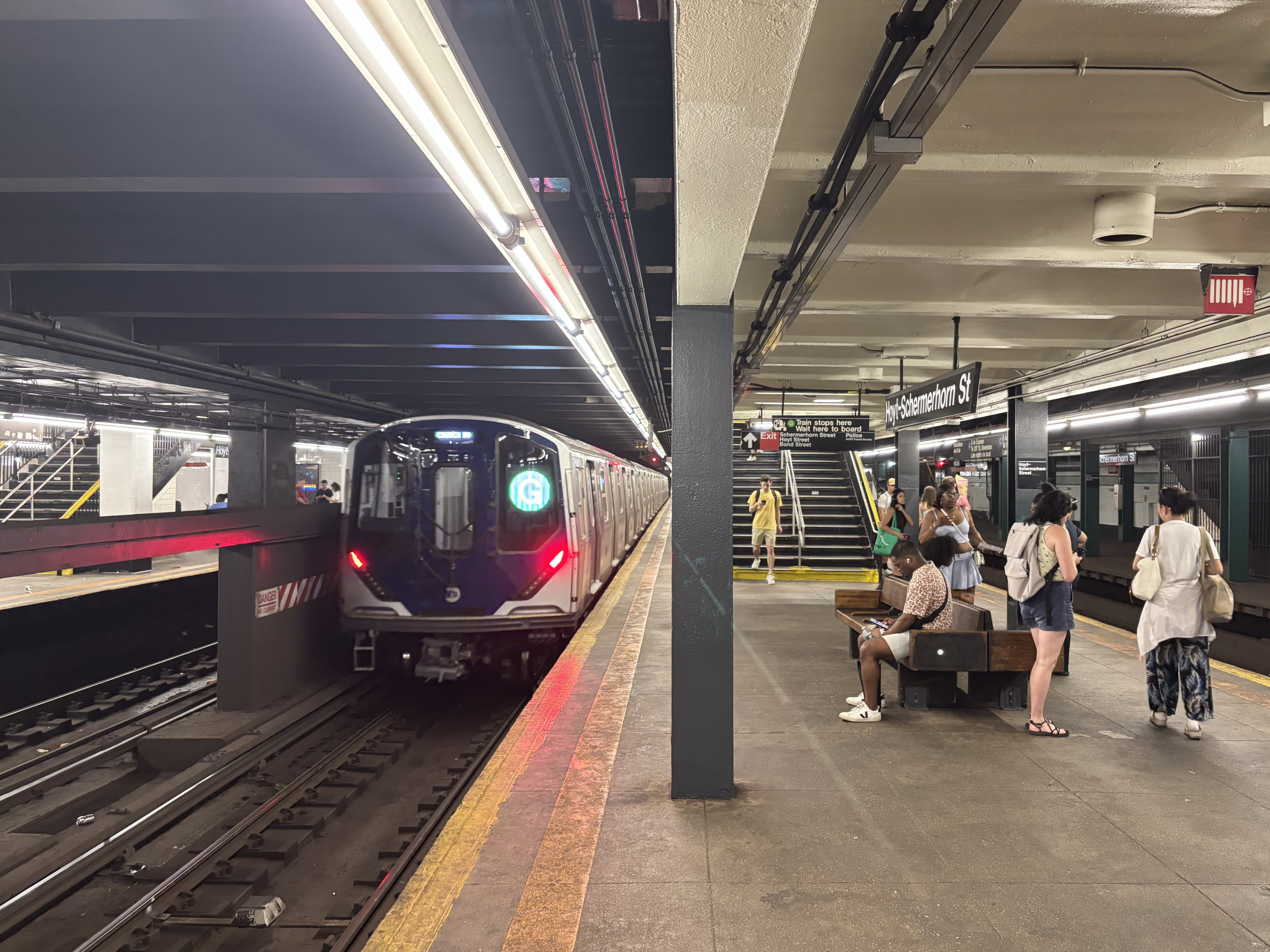
- Southbound R211A G train departing

Station statistics
- Address: Hoyt Street & Schermerhorn Street; Brooklyn, New York
- Borough: Brooklyn
- Locale: Downtown Brooklyn, Boerum Hill
- Coordinates: 40°41′20.48″N 73°59′10.11″W
- Division: B (IND)
- Line: IND Crosstown Line; IND Fulton Street Line
- Services: A (all times); C (all except late nights); G (all times)
- Transit: NYCT Bus: B25, B26, B38, B41, B45, B52, B63, B65, B67; MTA Bus: B103
- Structure: Underground
- Platforms: 4 island platforms (2 in passenger service) cross-platform interchange
- Tracks: 6 (4 in passenger service)

Other information
- Opened: April 9, 1936; 90 years ago
- Accessible: Partially; access to mezzanine only, access to platforms planned
- Accessibility: Cross-platform transfer available
- Former/other names: Hoyt–Schermerhorn

Traffic
- 2025: 3,037,224 ▲6.1%
- Rank: 123 out of 423
Services
Preceding station	New York City Subway	Following station
Jay Street–MetroTech A C via Canal Street	Express	Nostrand Avenue A toward Far Rockaway–Mott Avenue or Ozone Park–Lefferts Boulevard
Jay Street–MetroTech A C via Canal Street	Local	Lafayette Avenue A C toward Euclid Avenue
Bergen Street G toward Church Avenue	G (New York City Subway service)	Fulton Street G toward Court Square
Non-revenue services and lines
Preceding station	New York City Subway	Following station
Court Street Fulton local; closed	no service	
Location
Location within New York City Subway
Location within New York City
Location within New York
Track layout
Street map
Station service legend
Symbol	Description
Stops all times except late nights	Stops all times except late nights
Stops all times	Stops all times
Stops late nights only	Stops late nights only

The Hoyt–Schermerhorn Streets station (shown as "Hoyt-Schermerhorn" on official subway maps) is an express station of the New York City Subway, serving the IND Crosstown Line and the IND Fulton Street Line. Located at the intersection of Hoyt Street and Schermerhorn Street on the border of Downtown Brooklyn and Boerum Hill, it is served by the A and G trains at all times, as well as the C train except late nights.

Hoyt–Schermerhorn Streets was developed as an interchange station between the Fulton Street and Crosstown lines of the Independent Subway System (IND). Construction began around 1929, and it was opened on April 9, 1936. Hoyt–Schermerhorn Streets has six tracks and four island platforms, with two platforms and three tracks for each direction of service. The innermost tracks in each direction originally served Crosstown Line trains, while the center tracks were supposed to serve Fulton Street express trains and the outermost tracks were supposed to serve Fulton Street local trains to Court Street. However, Court Street was only served by a shuttle train from Hoyt–Schermerhorn Streets, which stopped running in 1946.

Today, all Fulton Street Line trains use the center tracks in each direction, and all Crosstown Line trains use the innermost tracks, while the outermost tracks and platforms are not used for revenue service. Until 1981, the outer platforms were used by special trains to Aqueduct Racetrack, which stopped on the center tracks in each direction. Today, the abandoned tracks and platforms are only used on special occasions, such as for film shoots or moving trains to the New York Transit Museum at the former Court Street station. The mezzanine has also been used for film shoots, most famously for the video of Michael Jackson's single "Bad". There is also a New York City Police Department (NYPD) transit precinct at the station.

== History ==
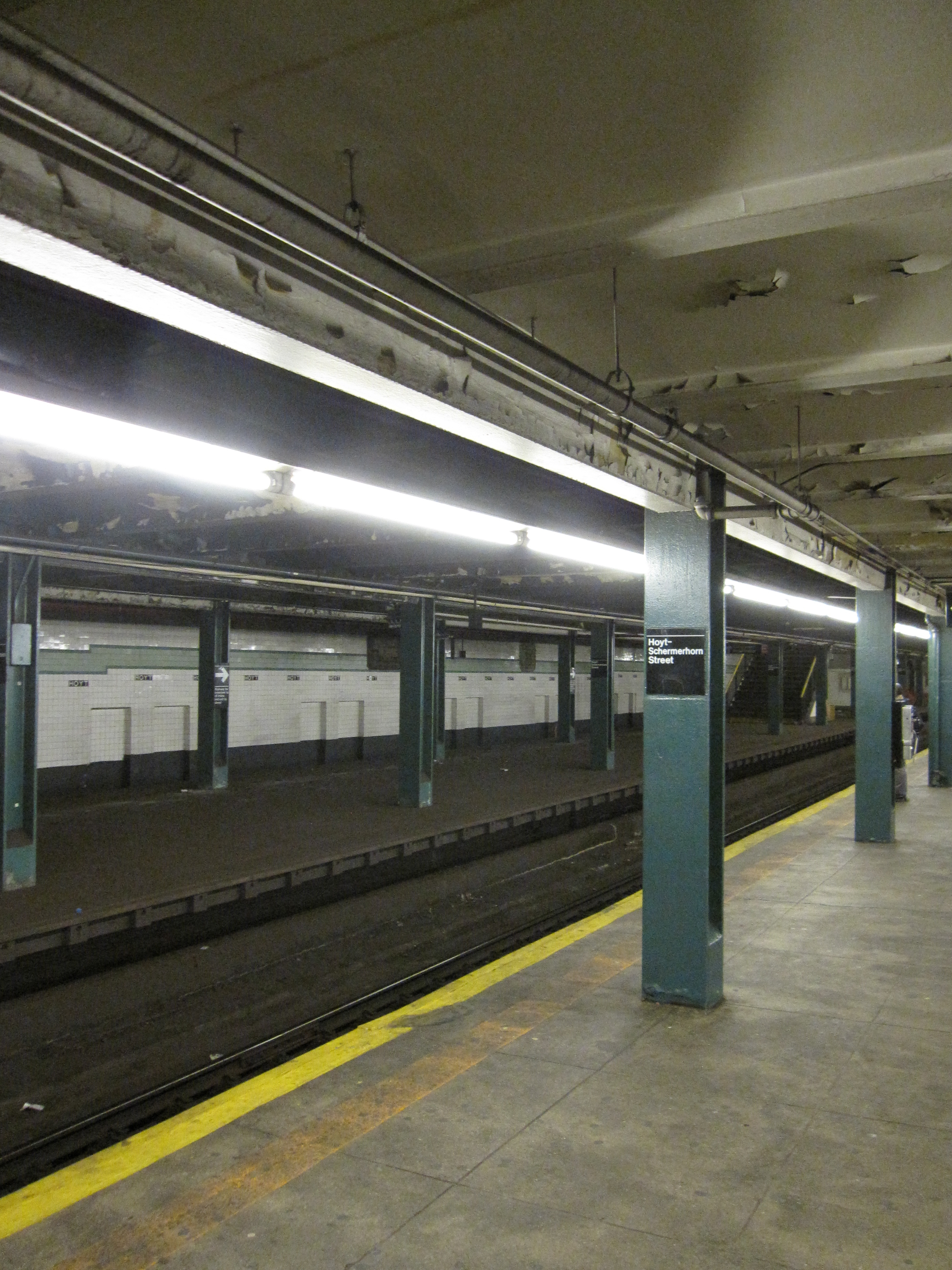
Each of the two abandoned platforms at the station is adjacent to one of the open platforms.

=== Construction and opening ===
Hoyt–Schermerhorn Streets was constructed as a junction between the Fulton Street and Crosstown lines of the Independent Subway System (IND), and part of the section of the Fulton Street subway under Schermerhorn Street between Court Street and Bond Street. Surveying by the New York City Board of Transportation along Schermerhorn Street began in 1928, and construction began around 1929. Property on the south side of Schermerhorn Street between Bond and Nevins Streets was condemned to facilitate the project. Like other stations along the lines, it was constructed via shallow cut-and-cover methods, with the street covered by wooden planks. In September 1929, a portion of the "plank road" above the station site collapsed. In 1935, Sixteen Sycamores Playground was constructed on a portion of the land condemned for subway construction east of the station.

The station was ceremonially opened by Mayor Fiorello LaGuardia on April 9, 1936, with the station serving both Fulton Street Line local and express trains. The station cost about $3 million to build, including $131,000 for the tilework. This station began serving Crosstown Line trains on July 1, 1937, when the Crosstown Line was extended from Nassau Avenue. From this station, northbound Fulton local trains were planned to continue to Court Street and terminate there. Express trains would turn north under Jay Street and continue to Manhattan via the Cranberry Street Tunnel. However, initial Fulton Street service ran entirely local at the time, as the line only ran to Rockaway Avenue. Without express service, local trains provided service to Manhattan via the express tracks at this station while the HH shuttle was instituted to serve Court Street and the local tracks/platforms.

=== Later usage ===
On October 9, 1936, a public hearing was held to discuss the construction of a passageway between the station and the Loeser's Department Store on the north side of Livingston Street. In November 1937, the city Board of Transportation approved the construction of a 250-foot (76 m) passageway between the station and the department store. The passageway opened on December 8, 1938. As part of the project, a stairway was constructed from the passageway to the south side of Livingston Street.

The now-covered passageway to Loeser's is commemorated with an artistic panel on a mezzanine wall in the station.

Due to low ridership, the Court Street station was closed and the shuttle was discontinued in 1946. All Fulton Street service was routed via the express tracks at this station to Jay Street – Borough Hall. This eliminated any use for the local tracks and they have been out of service since. The outer platforms were also closed until 1959, when the special service to Aqueduct Racetrack began. Service ran from the lower level of the 42nd Street–Port Authority Bus Terminal station to the Aqueduct Racetrack station via the IND Eighth Avenue Line, Fulton Street Line, and IND Rockaway Line. Like the lower level at 42nd Street, the outer platforms at Hoyt–Schermerhorn Streets provided a convenient place to segregate passengers who had paid the extra fare required to board the special trains. Consequently, Hoyt–Schermerhorn Streets was the only stop between 42nd Street and the racetrack.

The Aqueduct service was eliminated in 1981, and the outer platforms have since remained out of revenue service. The abandoned parts of the station are often used for film shoots: for example, scenes for The Warriors and The Taking of Pelham 123 were shot there. They are also used for other special functions, such as a public display of the then-new R160B subway cars in 2005.

After Michael Jackson died in 2009, New York City Council member Letitia James proposed to rename the station after Jackson, who had filmed the video for his song "Bad" there. The Metropolitan Transportation Authority rejected the idea. MTA spokesperson Kevin Ortiz said that the agency was developing guidelines for station naming-rights deals in order to raise money. In addition, naming stations after individuals could confuse riders. The MTA also declined to put a plaque in the station, saying its guidelines banned such an action. In 2018, the owner of a privately owned building above one of the station's entrances agreed to paint a mural dedicated to Jackson.

As part of the construction of building at 209 Schermerhorn Street, developer Rose Associates built an elevator entrance, which opened in September 2018. The MTA announced in 2019 that the Hoyt–Schermerhorn Streets station would become ADA-accessible as part of the agency's 2020–2024 Capital Program. The project was to be funded by congestion pricing in New York City, but it was postponed in June 2024 after the implementation of congestion pricing was delayed. In October 2026, the MTA announced plans to install taller fare gates with glass panels at 20 additional stations, including the Hoyt–Schermerhorn Streets station, following a successful pilot program at earlier stations.

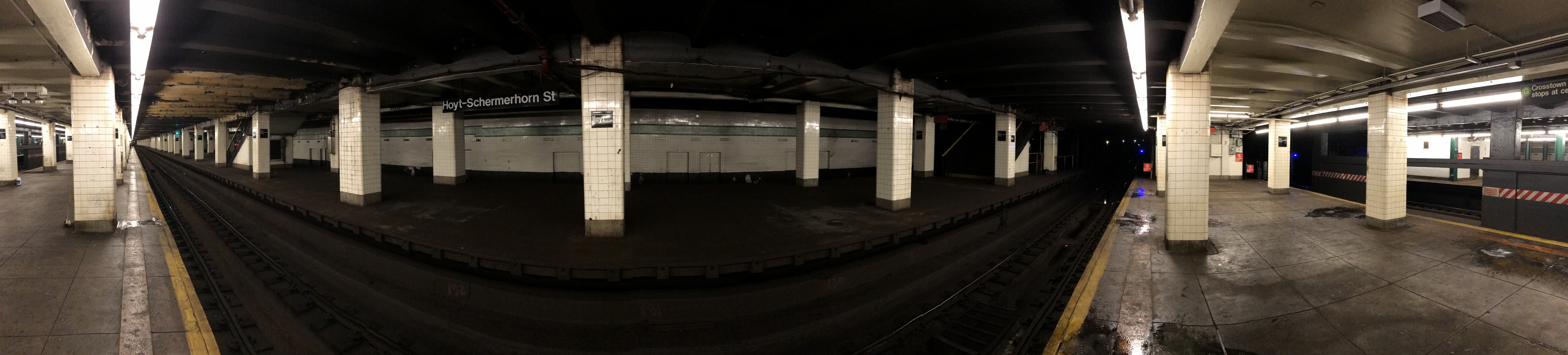
Panoramic view of the abandoned platform next to the Queens-bound one

== Station layout ==
The station has six tracks and four island platforms. Each platform is 660 feet (200 m) long, and the entire station is approximately 143 feet (44 m) wide from north to south. The station is served by the A and G at all times and by the C except at night. To the east (railroad south) of this station, the C always makes local stops while the A makes express stops during the day and local stops during the night; the next stop is Lafayette Avenue for local trains and Nostrand Avenue for express trains. To the west (railroad north) of this station, the next stop is Jay Street–MetroTech for all A and C trains. For the G on the other hand, the station is between Bergen Street to the west (railroad south) and Fulton Street to the east (railroad north).

The innermost pair of tracks (Tracks E1 and E2) belongs to the Crosstown Line, served by the G. East of the station, they run under Lafayette Avenue; west of the station, they turn south and merge with the IND Sixth Avenue Line to form the IND Culver Line under Smith Street.

The second-outermost pair of tracks (Tracks A3 and A4) are for the Fulton Street Line, its former express tracks, served by the A and C. Both trains open their doors on their left, to the inner island platforms. East of the station, southbound nighttime A and daytime C trains cross to the local tracks, while northbound trains do the reverse. All four tracks continue east under Fulton Street; west of the station, the Fulton tracks curve north under Jay Street and continue as the IND Eighth Avenue Line. There is no track connection between the Fulton and Crosstown lines.

The outermost pair of tracks—the former Fulton Street local tracks (Tracks A1 and A2)—and the outer two island platforms are no longer used in revenue service. To the west, the tracks continue under Schermerhorn Street to the decommissioned Court Street station, currently the site of the New York Transit Museum, in Brooklyn Heights. Track A2 is currently out of service for the storage of trains at the New York Transit Museum. Though it may be difficult to see in some of the unlighted portions of the station, a tile band is present on the trackside walls–similar in color to the Crosstown Line stations north to Flushing Avenue, and the Fulton Line stations east to Franklin Avenue–Lime (Nile) Green with a medium Kelly Green border, set in a three-high course consistent with many IND express stations. Captions reading "HOYT" are present in white lettering on a black background, with no mention of "Schermerhorn". On the eastbound (southern) side, some of these captions have been stickered-over with different station names as required for film and TV shoots while others are completely missing, though both sides have been used for filming. Both northern platforms have green-painted steel I-beams, while the beams on both southern platforms are tiled. Much of the ceiling at platform level is peeling due to water damage. A control tower is located at the eastern (railroad south) end of the outer southbound platform, and is staffed at all times except late nights.

Due to its width, the southern half of the station had to be built under private property on the south side of Schermerhorn Street. The station's mezzanine, located over the northern half of the station directly underneath Schermerhorn Street, contains a New York City Transit Police precinct office where the operations of NYPD Transit District 30 are headquartered, and several New York City Transit Authority offices. From the mezzanine, there are three staircases to each active platform, a turnstile bank, and a token booth.

=== Exits ===
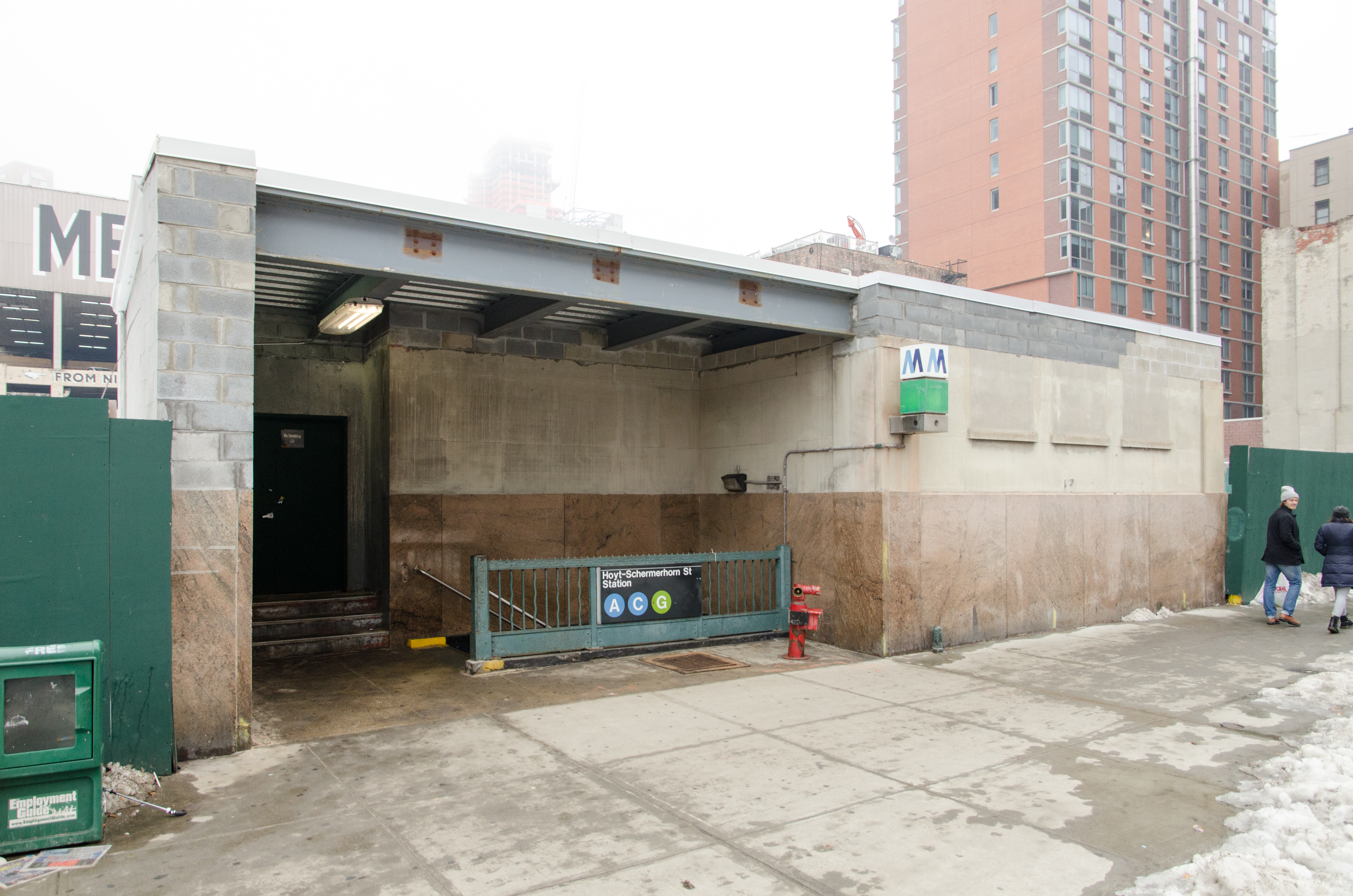
Station entrance at 209 Schermerhorn Street, seen in 2014 before reconstruction

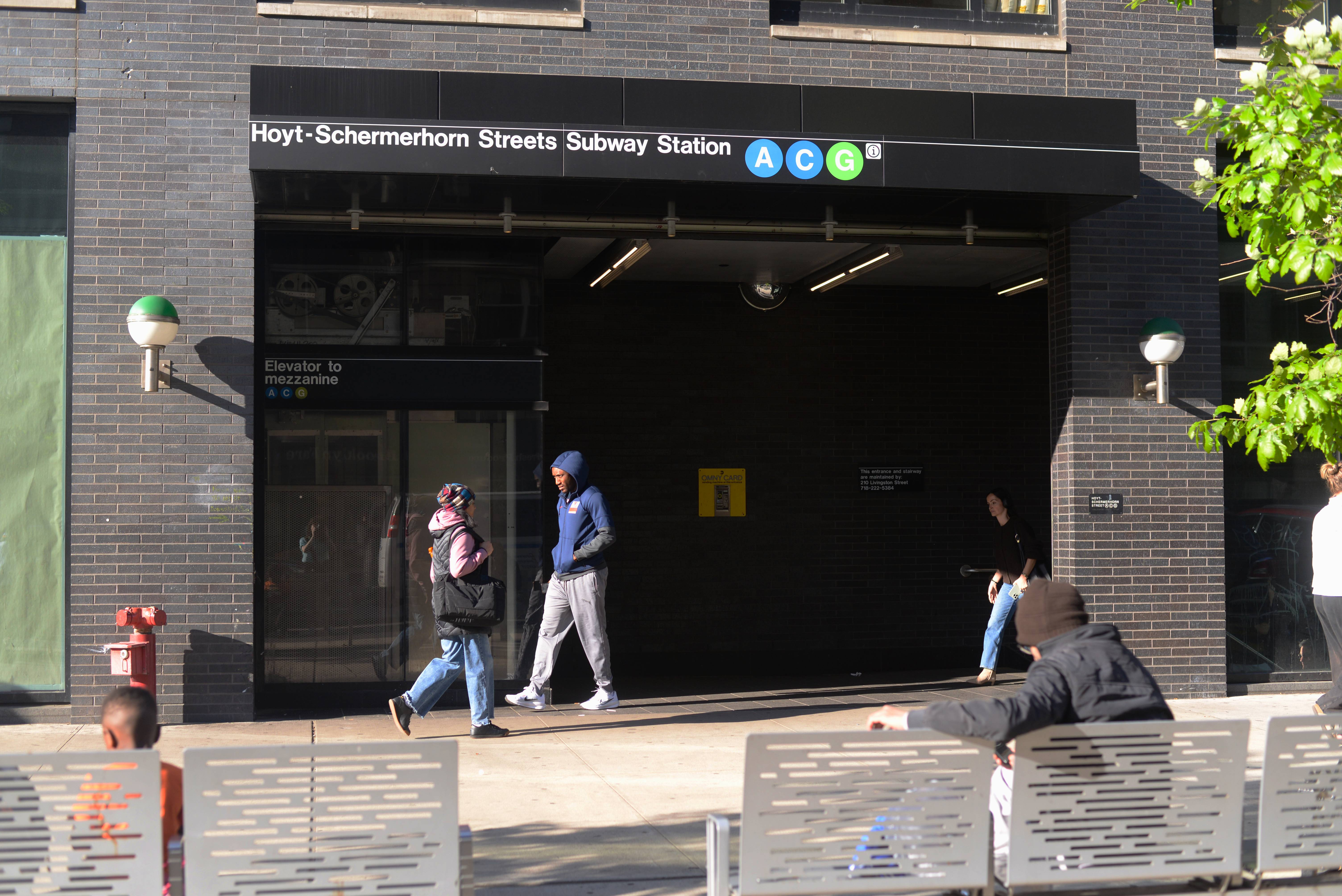
The same entrance after the addition of an elevator to mezzanine level

There are three exits. One is within a building and goes to the northwestern corner of Bond and Schermerhorn Streets; it connects to fare control via a corridor. Another goes to the middle of the block between Hoyt and Bond Streets and is built inside 225 Schermerhorn Street. The third exit goes close to the northeastern corner of Hoyt and Schermerhorn Streets and is built inside 209 Schermerhorn Street (also known as 45 Hoyt Street, or Hoyt & Horn). The third exit contains an elevator from street level to the mezzanine.

In addition to the open entrances, there are numerous sealed passages and exits; a count indicated eight closed street stairs. One was built into 189 Schermerhorn Street, but may have been demolished when a new building was erected. Another was built into the building occupying 227 to 253 Schermerhorn Street. Two more were built into 33 Bond Street, but one may have been demolished when a new building was made. Another led to the southwestern corner of Hoyt and Schermerhorn Streets, but is sealed on street level. Another led to the southeastern corner of Bond and Schermerhorn Streets, but is also sealed on street level. There is a closed passage next to the open Bond Street exit that leads to a street stair on the southwestern corner of Bond and Livingston Streets, one block north of Schermerhorn Street. This passage to Livingston Street further led to the now-defunct Loeser's Department Store, which eventually became a McCrory's. Part of the mezzanine tilework at this location still features navy blue and gold Art Deco designs, including large plaques bearing the store's logo. These had previously been shop windows.

=== Service patterns ===
Bergen Street (IND Culver Line)	Jay Street – MetroTech (IND Fulton Street Line)	Court Street (IND Fulton Street Line)
West of the station
IND Crosstown Line; G (all times)	IND Eighth Avenue Line tunnels A (all times); C (all except late nights)	IND Fulton Street Line to Court Street no regular service
In the station
innermost tracks G (all times)	center tracks A (all times); C (all except late nights)	outermost tracks no regular service
East of the station
IND Crosstown Line; G (all times)	IND Fulton Street Line express A (all except late nights)	IND Fulton Street Line local A (late nights); C (all except late nights)
Fulton Street (IND Crosstown Line)	Nostrand Avenue (IND Fulton Street Line)	Lafayette Avenue (IND Fulton Street Line)

== In popular culture ==
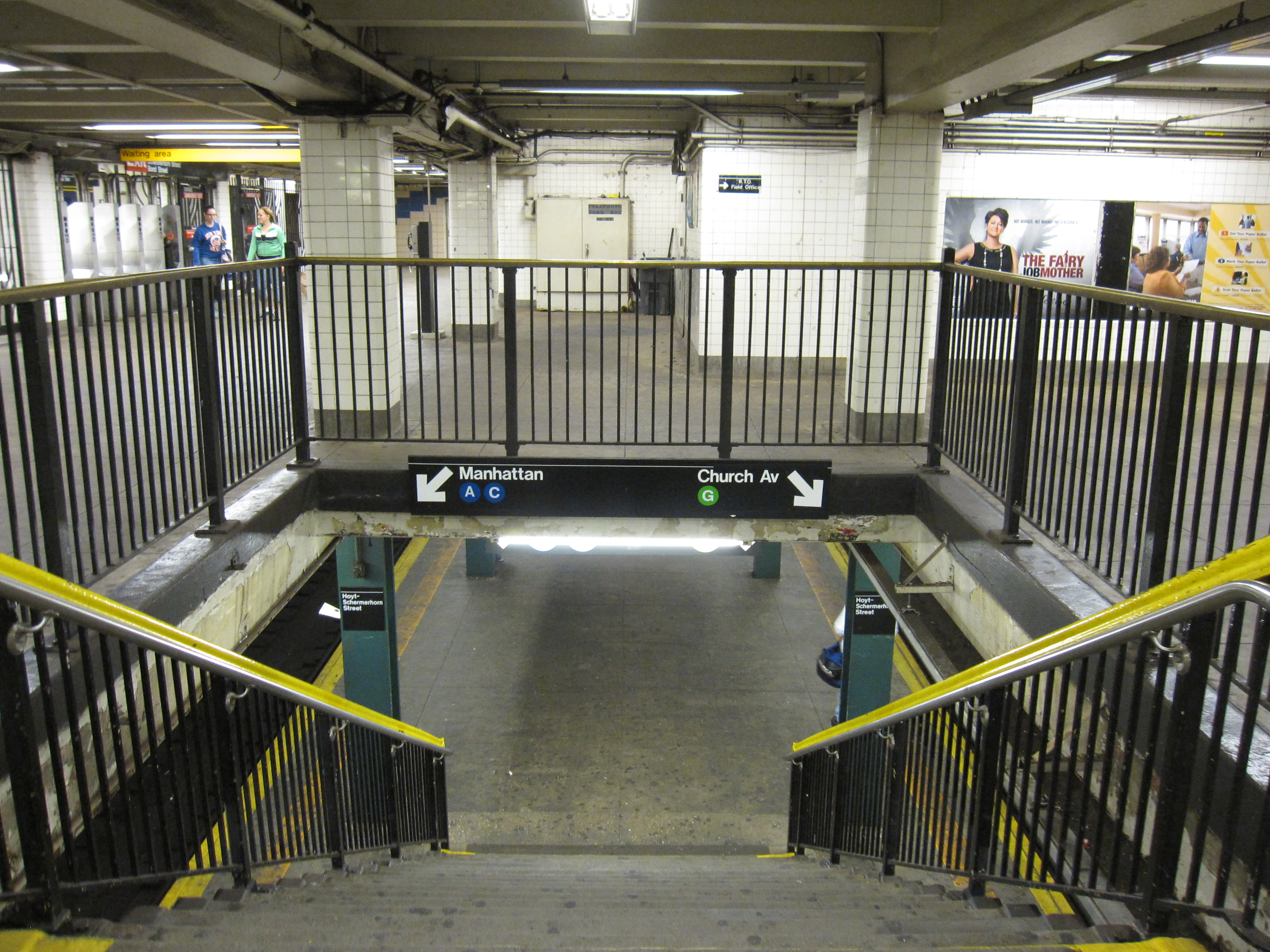
The station's mezzanine, which was featured in the music video for Michael Jackson's 1987 single "Bad"

The unused portions of the Hoyt–Schermerhorn Streets station have appeared in several films, TV episodes, and videos. The station was featured in The Wiz (1978) in which the characters find themselves in a strange Emerald city subway with evil monsters such as chomping trashcans and subway columns that move and try to trap the characters. The station was also featured in the Eddie Murphy comedy Coming to America (1988), as well as in Teenage Mutant Ninja Turtles (1990). Sidney Lumet's The Pawnbroker (1964), The Warriors (1979), Nighthawks (1981), Crocodile Dundee (1986) and Crocodile Dundee II (1988), and The Taking of Pelham 123 (2009) have also filmed at Hoyt–Schermerhorn Streets.

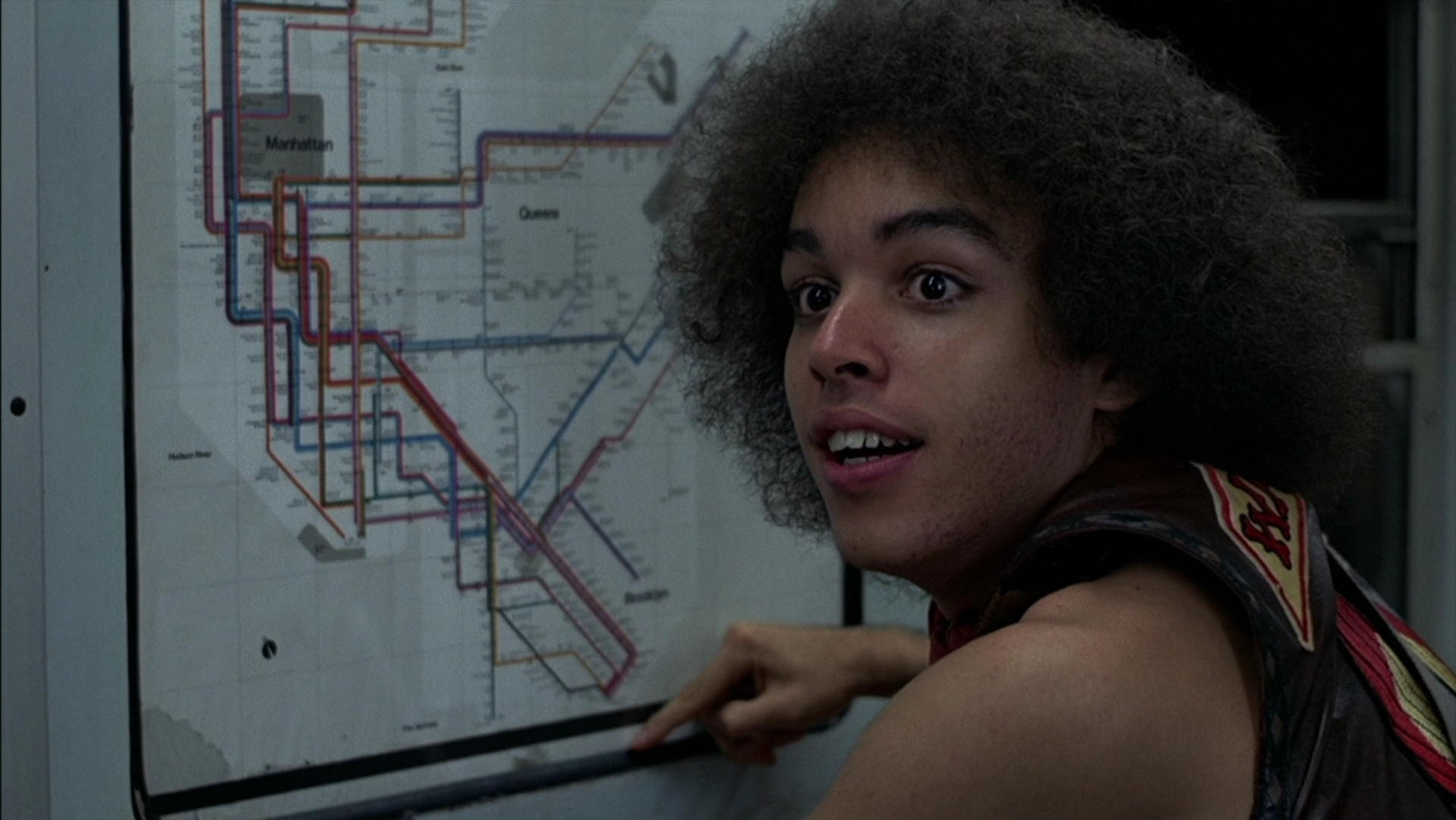
The Warriors actor Marcelino Sánchez examines a subway map in the 1979 film.

The Hoyt–Schermerhorn Streets station's mezzanine was the main setting for the filming of Michael Jackson's music video/short film for his hit 1987 single "Bad", as well as "Weird Al" Yankovic's parody, "Fat". The opening scene of the Law & Order episode "Subterranean Homeboy Blues" (1990) was filmed in this station. The station is referenced in the title of Leikeli47's song "Hoyt and Schermerhorn" from Acrylic. The station is also mentioned in Soul Coughing's song "The Brooklynites" from the Blue in the Face movie soundtrack.

In 2026, the Brooklyn Academy of Music (BAM) screened a film series titled Hoyt-Schermerhorn: Stand Clear of the Closing Doors, which celebrated 90 years of the historic station with showings of the beloved films shot there.
