= Nostrand Avenue station (IND Fulton Street Line) =

New York City Subway station in Brooklyn

Nostrand Avenue
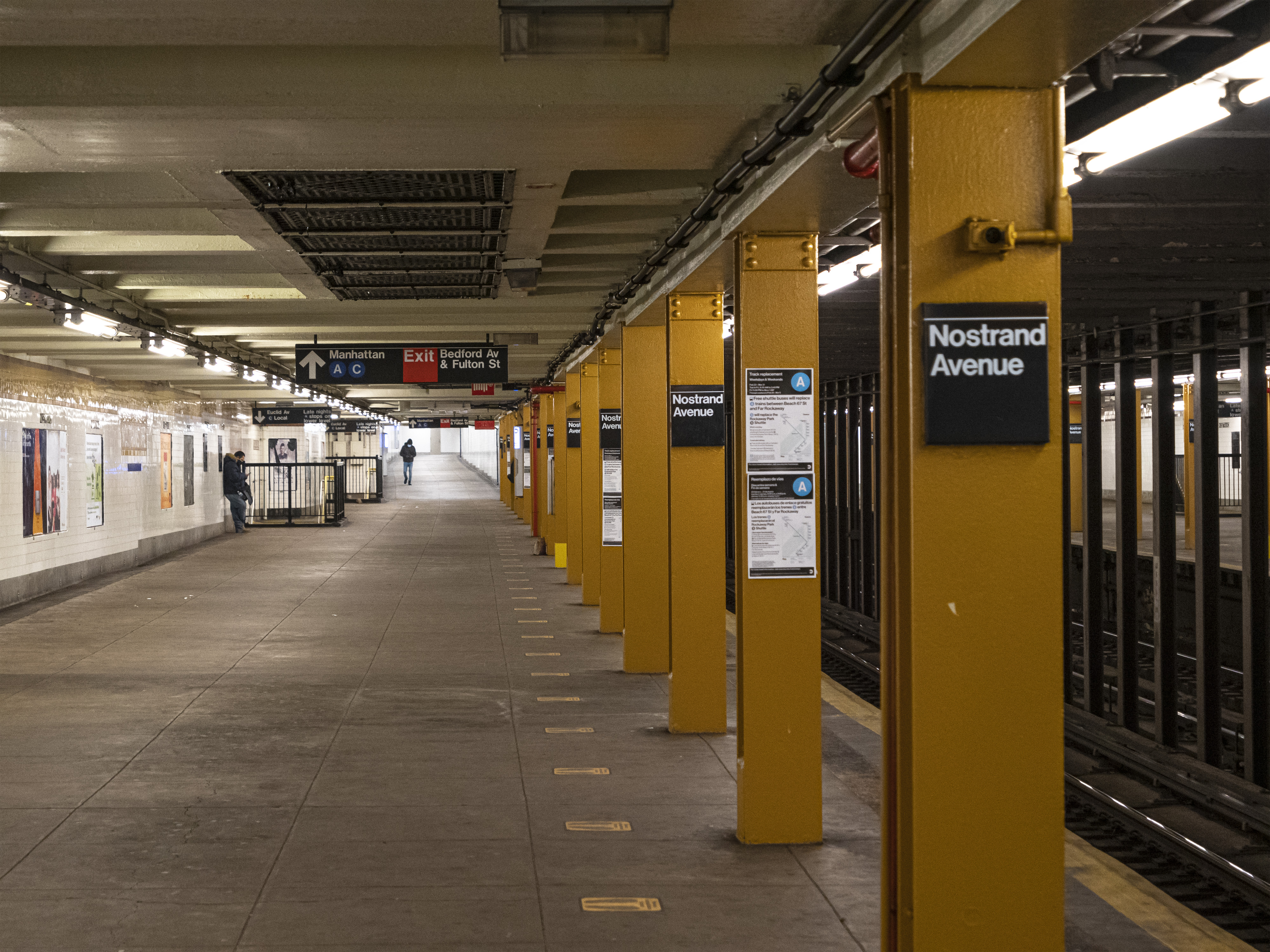
- View of the southbound upper level platform, with the passageway to the reopened Bedford Avenue mezzanine in the distance

Station statistics
- Address: Nostrand Avenue & Fulton Street; Brooklyn, New York
- Borough: Brooklyn
- Locale: Bedford–Stuyvesant
- Coordinates: 40°40′50″N 73°56′59″W
- Division: B (IND)
- Line: IND Fulton Street Line
- Services: A (all times); C (all except late nights)
- Transit: NYCT Bus: B25, B44, B44 SBS; LIRR Nostrand Avenue station
- Structure: Underground
- Levels: 2
- Platforms: 4 side platforms (2 on each level)
- Tracks: 4 (2 on each level)

Other information
- Opened: April 9, 1936; 90 years ago
- Accessible: No; planned

Traffic
- 2025: 4,254,913 ▲8.8%
- Rank: 80 out of 423
Services
Preceding station	New York City Subway	Following station
Hoyt–Schermerhorn Streets A toward Inwood–207th Street	Express	Utica Avenue A toward Far Rockaway–Mott Avenue or Ozone Park–Lefferts Boulevard
Franklin Avenue A C toward 168th Street	Local	Kingston–Throop Avenues A C toward Euclid Avenue
Location
Location within New York City Subway
Location within New York City
Location within New York
Track layout
Upper level
Lower level
Street map
Station service legend
Symbol	Description
Stops all times except late nights	Stops all times except late nights
Stops all times	Stops all times
Stops late nights only	Stops late nights only

The Nostrand Avenue station is a bi-level express station on the IND Fulton Street Line of the New York City Subway, located at the intersection of Nostrand Avenue and Fulton Street in Bedford–Stuyvesant, Brooklyn. It is served by the A train at all times and the C train at all times except late nights.

The station was planned as part of the construction of the Independent Subway System (IND)'s Fulton Street Line. Construction of the station began around 1929, and it was opened to service on April 9, 1936. Several of the station's entrances were closed in the late 20th century due to crime. In the 2010s and 2020s, the Metropolitan Transportation Authority (MTA) announced plans to make the station ADA-accessible and to reopen closed exits.

Nostrand Avenue has four tracks and four side platforms, with two platform levels. Express trains stop on the upper level while local trains stop on the lower level. This is because, in the original design for the station, the Nostrand Avenue station was slated to be a local station with only two platforms, and the current upper level was intended to be a mezzanine. The primary entrances to the local and express platforms in each direction are at Nostrand Avenue and Fulton Street. Another set of entrances from both sets of platforms leads to Bedford Avenue and Fulton Street.

== History ==
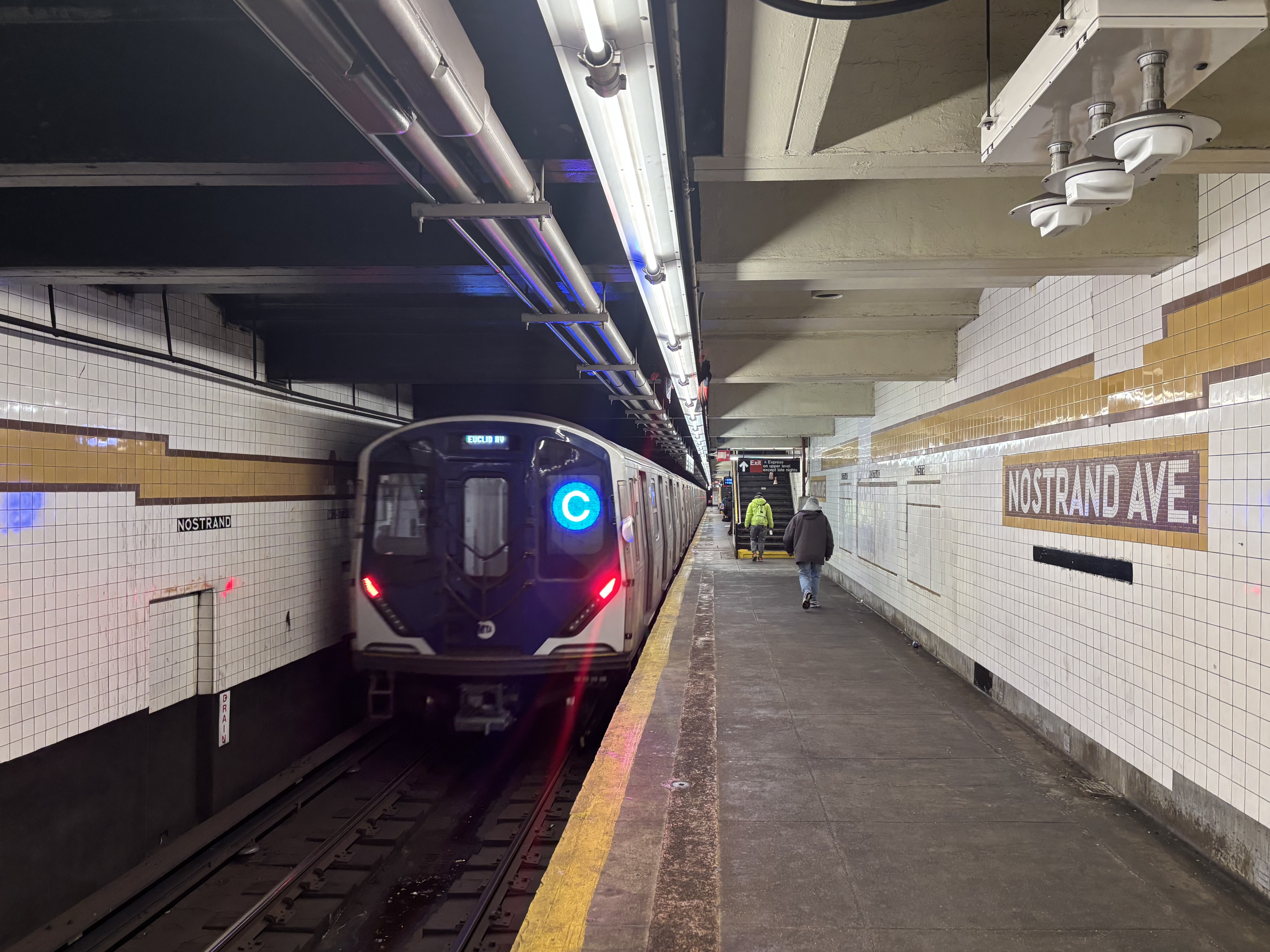
R211A C train departing from the lower-level southbound platform

=== Early history ===
The Nostrand Avenue station was constructed as part of the IND Fulton Street Line, the main line of the city-owned Independent Subway System (IND)'s main line from Downtown Brooklyn to southern Queens. The groundbreaking for the line was held on April 16, 1929, at Fulton Street and Arlington Place, located at the site of the future station. The Nostrand Avenue station opened on April 9, 1936, as part of an extension of the IND from its previous Brooklyn terminus at Jay Street–Borough Hall, which opened three years earlier, to Rockaway Avenue. The new IND subway replaced the BMT Fulton Street Elevated, and this station replaced the elevated's Nostrand Avenue station, which was formerly above the current subway station until it closed on May 31, 1940.

Although the station was built with entrances at Bedford Avenue, Arlington Place, and Nostrand Avenue, only the ones at Nostrand Avenue were used for entry when the station first opened; the other entrances had been constructed with the rest of the line, but were boarded up upon the line's completion. By the 1940s, the staircases to Bedford Avenue were opened, but only for exiting the station. On January 12, 1943, business, church, and civic leaders from Brooklyn testified before the City Affairs Committee of the New York City Council, asking that the Bedford Avenue staircases to this station and staircases at Classon Avenue to the neighboring Franklin Avenue station be open for entry as well. On February 4, 1943, the City Council passed a resolution urging the New York City Board of Transportation (NYCBOT) to allow entry at the staircases. As a result of a year-long campaign from the Bedford–Stuyvesant Neighborhood Council, the NYCBOT agreed to open the Bedford Avenue staircases for entry into the station; the Neighborhood Council disclosed the announcement on June 16, 1950. Shortly after, the NYCBOT began work to allow entry via the staircases, which was completed on July 24, 1950 after a change booth and turnstiles were installed. The new entrance was open on Mondays to Fridays between 6:30 and 10:30 a.m., and from 3:30 to 7:30 p.m.

=== Deterioration and crime ===
In 1981, the Metropolitan Transportation Authority (MTA) listed the station among the 69 most deteriorated stations in the subway system. The Bedford Avenue entrances were closed by the New York City Transit Authority (NYCTA) before or during the 1980s. Though the entrances were closed, a portion of the mezzanine and passages to the mezzanine remained open to allow for free crossovers between directions.

The rest of the mezzanine was closed on an emergency basis in April 1991, after the NYCTA, on March 28, 1991, ordered the closing of the 15 most dangerous passageways in the subway system within a week following the rape of a woman behind a pile of debris in a passage connecting the 34th Street–Herald Square and 42nd Street–Bryant Park stations under Sixth Avenue on March 20, 1991. The locations were chosen based on crime volume, lighting, traffic and physical layout, and were closed under the declaration of a public safety emergency. The areas were blocked off with plywood and fencing until public hearings were held and official permission was obtained. By closing the entrances, the transit police could deploy many officers to other parts of the system. The crossover at the mezzanine was chosen because the station had 96 felonies since January 1, 1990. In January 1992, the MTA Board approved a request by the NYCTA to close 43 full-time or part-time station areas at 30 station complexes, including the crossover. With the closure of the crossover, during late nights, when the part-time booth to the Queens-bound platform was closed, passengers would use the existing high entrance and exit turnstiles. The NYCTA was also considering making this booth full-time.

On February 17, 2005, transit workers found two trash bags on the station's tracks, which contained the body parts of 19-year-old Rashawn Brazell, a Bushwick resident who had been reported missing three days earlier. In February 2017, 38-year-old Kwauhuru Govan was arrested for Brazell's murder.

=== Renovation ===
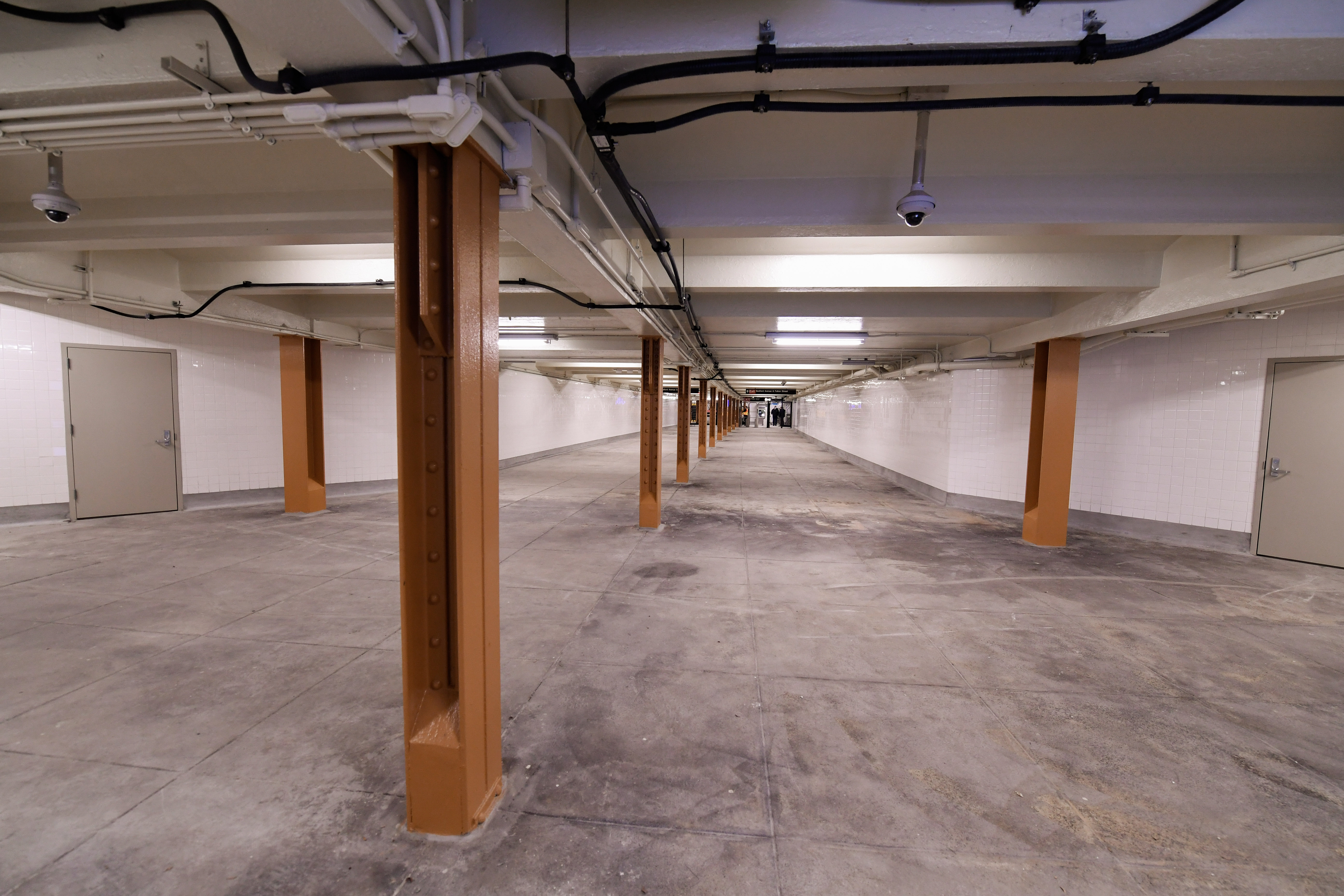
Reopened Bedford Avenue mezzanine

Despite overcrowding at the Nostrand Avenue station as ridership increased, the Bedford Avenue entrances remained closed for over 25 years. On December 11, 2015, New York City Transit released its Review of the A and C Lines report. Among the various aspects discussed, the report discussed the option of reopening closed station entrances along these routes. The report concluded that if additional capital funding was provided, or if the Federal Transit Administration's interpretation of the Americans with Disabilities Act of 1990 (ADA) reverted its original flexible approach, reopening closed entrances at Nostrand Avenue would become more feasible. The report stated that reopening the Bedford Avenue entrances would reduce congestion at the Nostrand Avenue entrance, reduce uneven loading on A and C trains, and cut the walking distance for riders going to and from areas west of Arlington Place - including bus riders. It also found that opening the unopened entrances at Arlington Place and Fulton Street to the northbound platform would provide similar benefits at a lower cost.

In 2019, the MTA announced that the Nostrand Avenue station would become ADA-accessible as part of the agency's 2020–2024 Capital Program. On February 6, 2020, the MTA announced that the Bedford Avenue entrances to the station would be reopened. The entrances were allowed to be reopened because the station would receive ADA improvements. Reopening the entrances cost around $2 million, with $1.25 million coming from New York City Transit, $500,000 from Assembly Member Tremaine Wright and $250,000 from State Senator Velmanette Montgomery. The work comprised the installation of lighting and turnstiles, the rehabilitation of stairways, the scraping and repainting of areas, the repairing and replacement of tile, and the construction of new sidewalk entrance structures. The entrances were intended to allow for free transfers between directions, better serve areas west of Arlington Place, and provide a direct connection to northbound B44 SBS service, as well as reduce severe overcrowding during the p.m. rush hour. The entrances were reopened on February 4, 2021. At the time, overall subway crime had decreased significantly compared to the 1980s and 1990s.

The installation of elevators at the station was to be funded by congestion pricing in New York City. The project was postponed in June 2024 after the implementation of congestion pricing was delayed. In April 2025, the MTA announced plans to install taller fare gates with glass panels at 20 stations, including the Nostrand Avenue station. The fare gates would be manufactured by Cubic Transportation Systems, Conduent, Scheidt & Bachmann, and STraffic as part of a pilot program to reduce fare evasion. After congestion pricing was approved, the MTA announced that the elevator installations would proceed. In July 2026, the MTA announced plans for accessibility renovations at five subway stations in Brooklyn. Among these, the Nostrand Avenue station would receive three elevators.

== Station layout ==
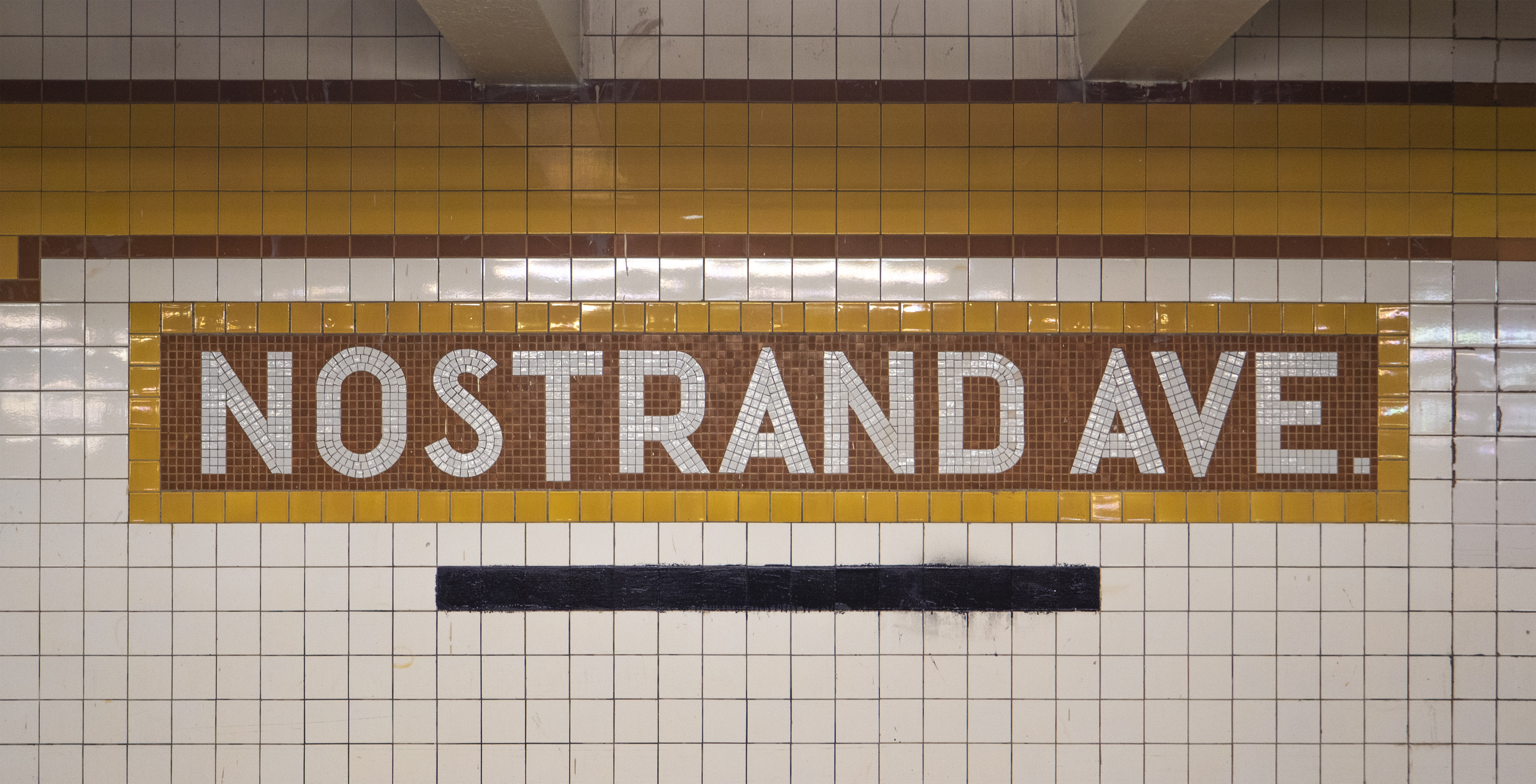
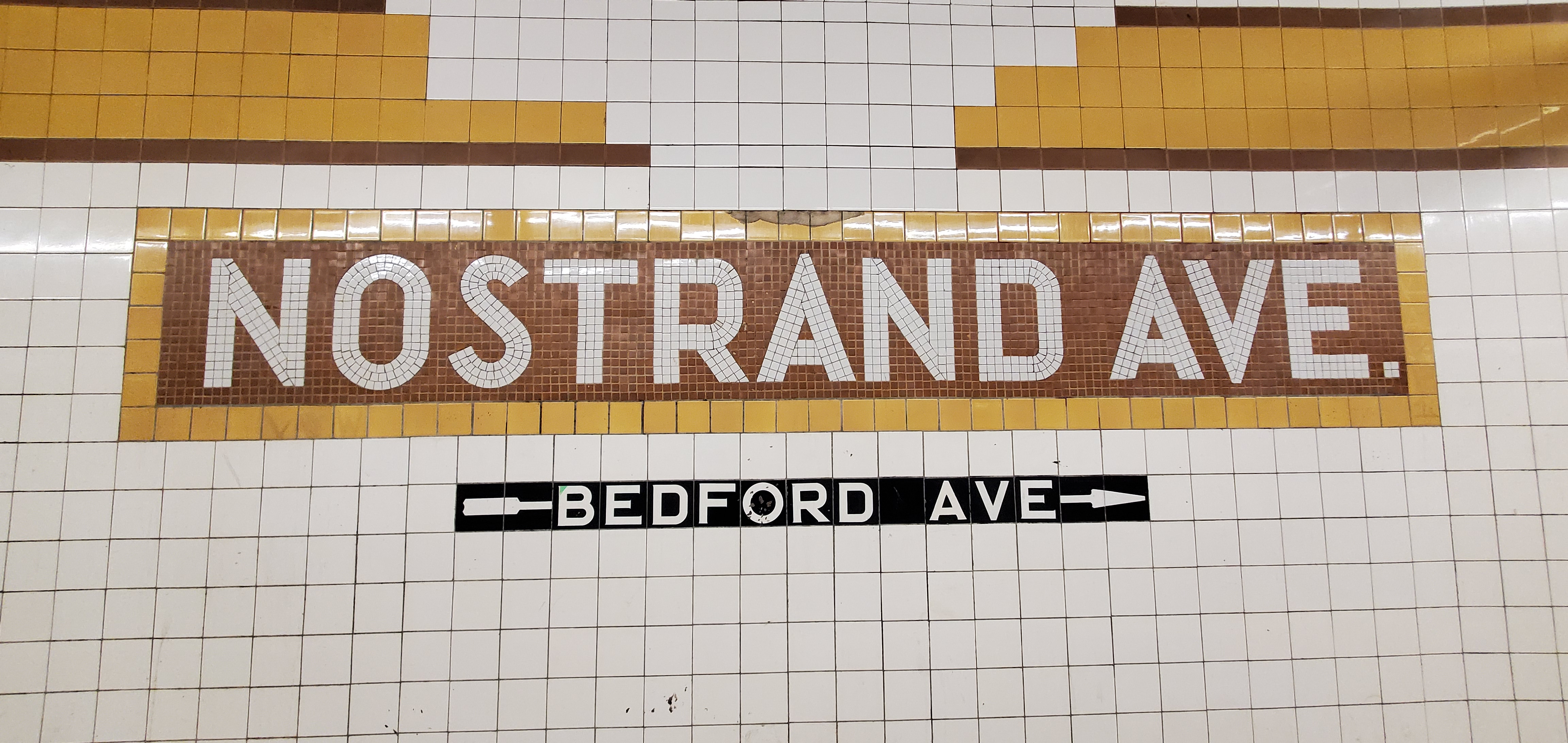
Mosaic name tablet on the upper level with painted over directional caption (top); mosaic on the lower level with caption pointing west to the Bedford Avenue entrance (bottom).

Nostrand Avenue is an express station, serving all trains, as opposed to a local station that serves only local trains. The A train stops at the station at all times, running express during the day and local at night, while the C train stops here at all times except nights and is local. The next stop to the west (railroad north) is Franklin Avenue for local trains and Hoyt–Schermerhorn Streets for express trains; the next stop to the east (railroad south) is Kingston–Throop Avenues for local trains and Utica Avenue for express trains.

It is the only two-level express station in the system that has the express tracks on the upper level and the local tracks on the lower one. The station was originally planned to be a conventional local station with four tracks and two side platforms, with a mezzanine, as proven by the fact that the upper-level platforms are wider than the lower level ones (which would have been consistent with the design of a mezzanine), and two unused trackways exist on the lower level between the local tracks (which would have been consistent with the typical design of a local station on a four-track line). A curtain wall separates the local tracks from the unused trackways on both sides. On either side of the station, the express tracks ascend from the local tracks to serve the upper level, then descend to rejoin them.

The station's trim-line is butterscotch yellow with a medium mustard brown border and is three tiles high, typical of IND express stations. Small tile captions reading "NOSTRAND" in white lettering on a black background run below the trim line, and there are mosaic name tablets reading "NOSTRAND AVE." in white sans-serif lettering on a mustard brown background with butterscotch yellow border. Directional captions are present below some of the name tablets, though many of the ones pointing to the previously closed Bedford Avenue and never opened Arlington Place entrances are painted over. Yellow I-beam columns run along the upper level platforms at regular intervals (the lower level is column-less), alternating ones having the standard black station name plate with white lettering. There is artwork from the Ronald Edmonds Learning Center Community School on the northbound platform. The platforms have directional signs to the other level in the same style as the name tablets and signs to the exit in the same style as the name tiles.

=== Exits ===
Each upper-level platform has its own same-level fare control. The station has a full-time booth in the Nostrand Avenue fare control area on the northbound platform, and used to have a part-time booth at the Nostrand Avenue fare control area on the southbound platform. The fare control areas have exits to all corners of Nostrand Avenue and Fulton Street, which are 15 feet (4.6 m) long and 6 feet (1.8 m) wide. There is one staircase to each corner. The Manhattan-bound side stairs lead to both northern corners of Nostrand Avenue and Fulton Street while the Queens-bound side stairs lead to both southern corners.

Both upper-level platforms also have a ramp at their geographical west (railroad north) ends, leading to a mezzanine with a crossover. There is one stair to each of the northeastern and southeastern corners of Bedford Avenue and Fulton Street, some 1,000 feet (300 m) west of the Nostrand Avenue entrances.

The Manhattan-bound upper level has a third unopened fare control area to both northern corners of Arlington Place and Fulton Street. This fare control area is located behind a tiled wall with a door near the railroad north (geographical west) end of the Manhattan-bound upper-level platform.
