= Kingston–Throop Avenues station =

New York City Subway station in Brooklyn

Kingston–Throop Avenues
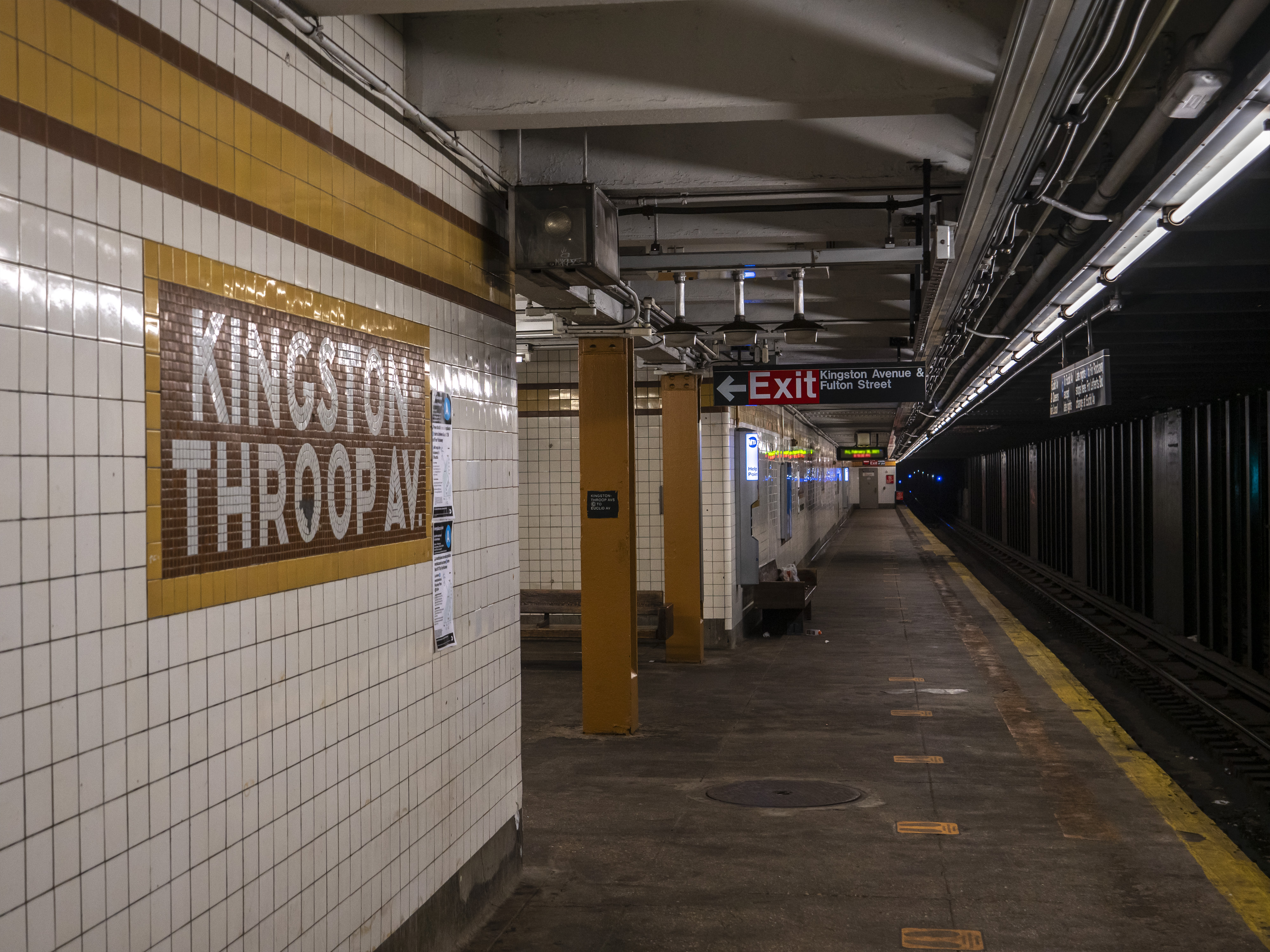
- Southbound platform

Station statistics
- Address: Fulton Street between Kingston Avenue & Throop Avenue; Brooklyn, New York
- Borough: Brooklyn
- Locale: Bedford–Stuyvesant
- Coordinates: 40.679857°N 73.940606°W
- Division: B (IND)
- Line: IND Fulton Street Line
- Services: A (late nights); C (all except late nights)
- Transit: NYCT Bus: B15, B25, B43
- Structure: Underground
- Platforms: 2 side platforms
- Tracks: 4

Other information
- Opened: April 9, 1936; 90 years ago

Traffic
- 2025: 1,627,039 ▲5.9%
- Rank: 214 out of 423
Services
Preceding station	New York City Subway	Following station
Nostrand Avenue A C toward 168th Street	Local	Utica Avenue A C toward Euclid Avenue
Location
Location within New York City Subway
Location within New York City
Location within New York
Track layout
Street map
Station service legend
Symbol	Description
Stops all times except late nights	Stops all times except late nights
Stops late nights only	Stops late nights only

The Kingston–Throop Avenues station is a local station on the IND Fulton Street Line of the New York City Subway. Located on Fulton Street between Kingston and Throop Avenues in Bedford–Stuyvesant, Brooklyn, it is served by the C train at all times except late nights, when the A train takes over service.

== History ==
The Kingston–Throop Avenues station was constructed as part of the IND Fulton Street Line, the main line of the city-owned Independent Subway System (IND)'s main line from Downtown Brooklyn to southern Queens. The groundbreaking for the line was held on April 16, 1929, at Fulton Street and Arlington Place. This station opened on April 9, 1936, as part of an extension of the Independent Subway System (IND) from its previous Brooklyn terminus at Jay Street–Borough Hall, which opened three years earlier, to Rockaway Avenue. The new IND subway replaced the BMT Fulton Street Elevated, and this station replaced its Brooklyn–Tompkins Avenues station, which closed on May 31, 1940.

Under the 2015–2019 Metropolitan Transportation Authority Capital Plan, the station, along with thirty other New York City Subway stations, were to have undergone a complete overhaul and would have been entirely closed for up to six months. Updates would include cellular service, Wi-Fi, charging stations, improved signage, and improved station lighting. However, most of these renovations are being deferred until the 2020–2024 Capital Program due to a lack of funding.

== Station layout ==
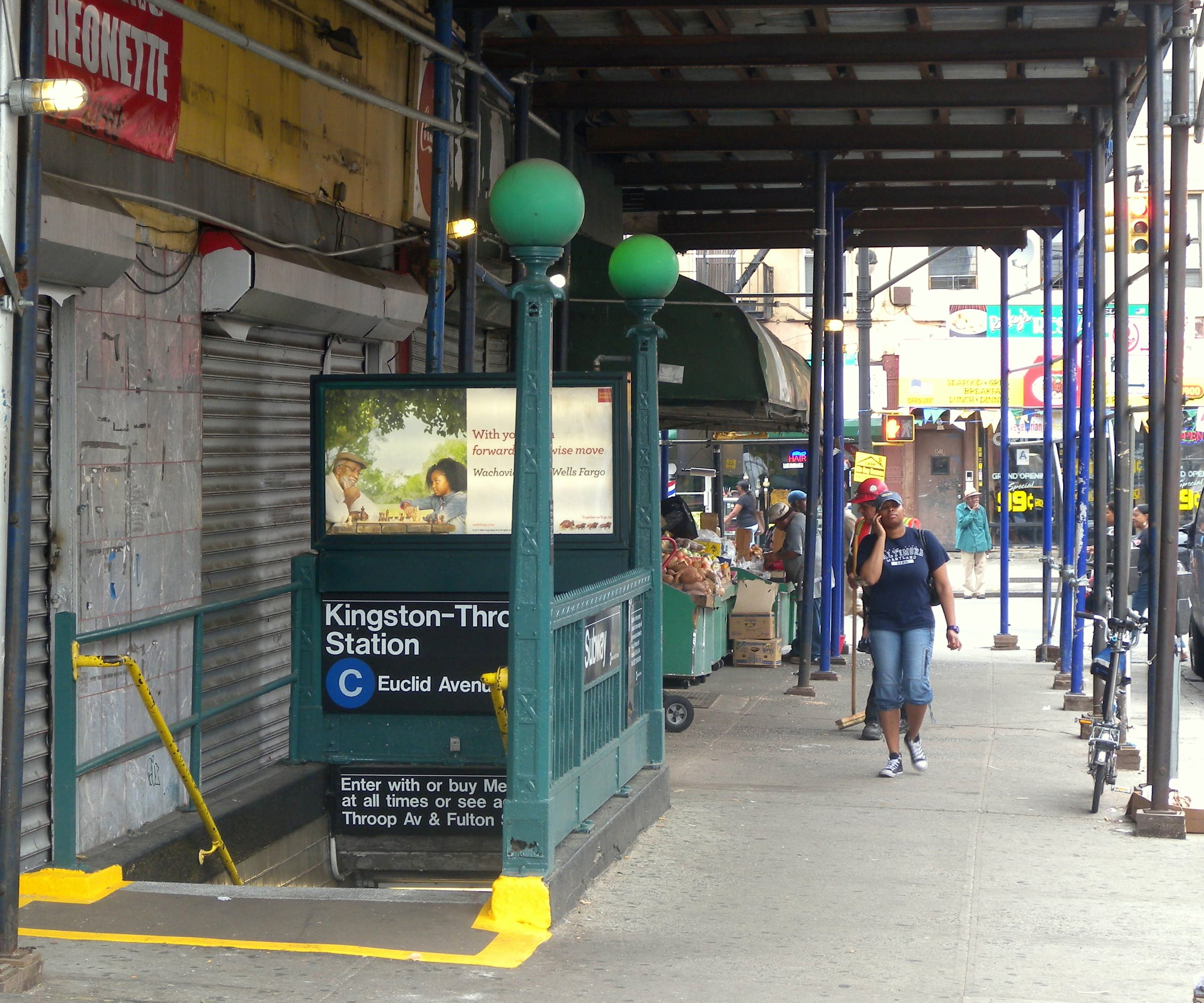
Eastbound street entrance

This underground station has four tracks and two noticeably offset side platforms, with the southbound platform located roughly 300 feet further west (railroad north) than the northbound platform. The two center tracks are used by the A express train during daytime hours. Both platforms have a butterscotch yellow trim line with a mustard brown border and mosaic name tablets reading KINGSTON - THROOP AV." in white sans serif lettering on two lines on a mustard brown background and butterscotch yellow border. Small tile captions alternating between "KINGSTON" and "THROOP" in white lettering on a black background run below the trim line, and directional captions in the same style are present below some of the name tablets. The platforms are column-less except for a few dark yellow I-beam ones near fare control.

=== Exits ===
Each platform has one same-level fare control area. The one on the Euclid Avenue- and Queens-bound platform is at the extreme west (railroad north) end and has a bank of three turnstiles, and two staircases going up to each southern corners of Fulton Street and Kingston Avenue. The one on the Manhattan-bound platform is at the center and has a bank of four turnstiles, a full-time token booth, and two staircases going up to either northern corners of Fulton Street and Throop Avenue.

== Incidents ==
This station was the site of a 1995 robbery that killed the token booth clerk, 50-year-old Harry Kaufman. Robbers squirted accelerant into the booth on the Euclid Avenue-bound platform and set the fumes alight with a match, causing an explosion that blew out the glass and deformed the booth. The incident drew national attention due to allegations that the movie Money Train (1995) inspired the murder. The allegations were unfounded and the movie's producer, Columbia Pictures, claimed that the scenes were inspired by an earlier event, in 1988, where another token booth clerk was killed in the same fashion.

== Nearby points of interest ==
- Brooklyn Children's Museum
- Restoration Plaza
