= Nostrand Avenue station (BMT Fulton Street Line) =

Nostrand Ave.

General information
- Location: Fulton Street and Nostrand Avenue; Bedford-Stuyvesant, Brooklyn, New York
- Coordinates: 40.680377°N 73.949543°W
- Line: BMT Fulton Street Line
- Platforms: 2 side platforms
- Tracks: 2
- Connections: Nostrand Avenue, Lorimer Street, Marcy Avenue, and Ocean Avenue Trolleys

Construction
- Structure type: Elevated

History
- Opened: April 24, 1888; 138 years ago
- Closed: May 31, 1940; 86 years ago

Services
Preceding station	BMT Lines	Following station
Franklin Avenue toward Park Row or Fulton Ferry	13: Fulton Street Local	Tompkins Avenue One-way operation
Franklin Avenue toward Park Row or Fulton Ferry	13: Fulton Street Local	Brooklyn Avenue toward Lefferts Avenue
Location

Nostrand Avenue was a station on the demolished BMT Fulton Street Line. It was originally built on April 24, 1888, and had 2 tracks and 2 side platforms. It was served by trains of the BMT Fulton Street Line, and served as the eastern terminus of the line for a month and a week. Nostrand Avenue station had connections to at least four streetcar lines; The Nostrand Avenue Trolley, the Lorimer Street Line, the Marcy Avenue Line, and the Ocean Avenue Line trolleys. Under the Dual Contracts, the station was the west end of a project to expand the line from two to three tacks. On April 9, 1936, the Independent Subway System built the Nostrand Avenue Subway Station along the IND Fulton Street Line. The el station became obsolete, and it closed on May 31, 1940.
