= 88th Street station =

New York City Subway station in Queens

88 Street
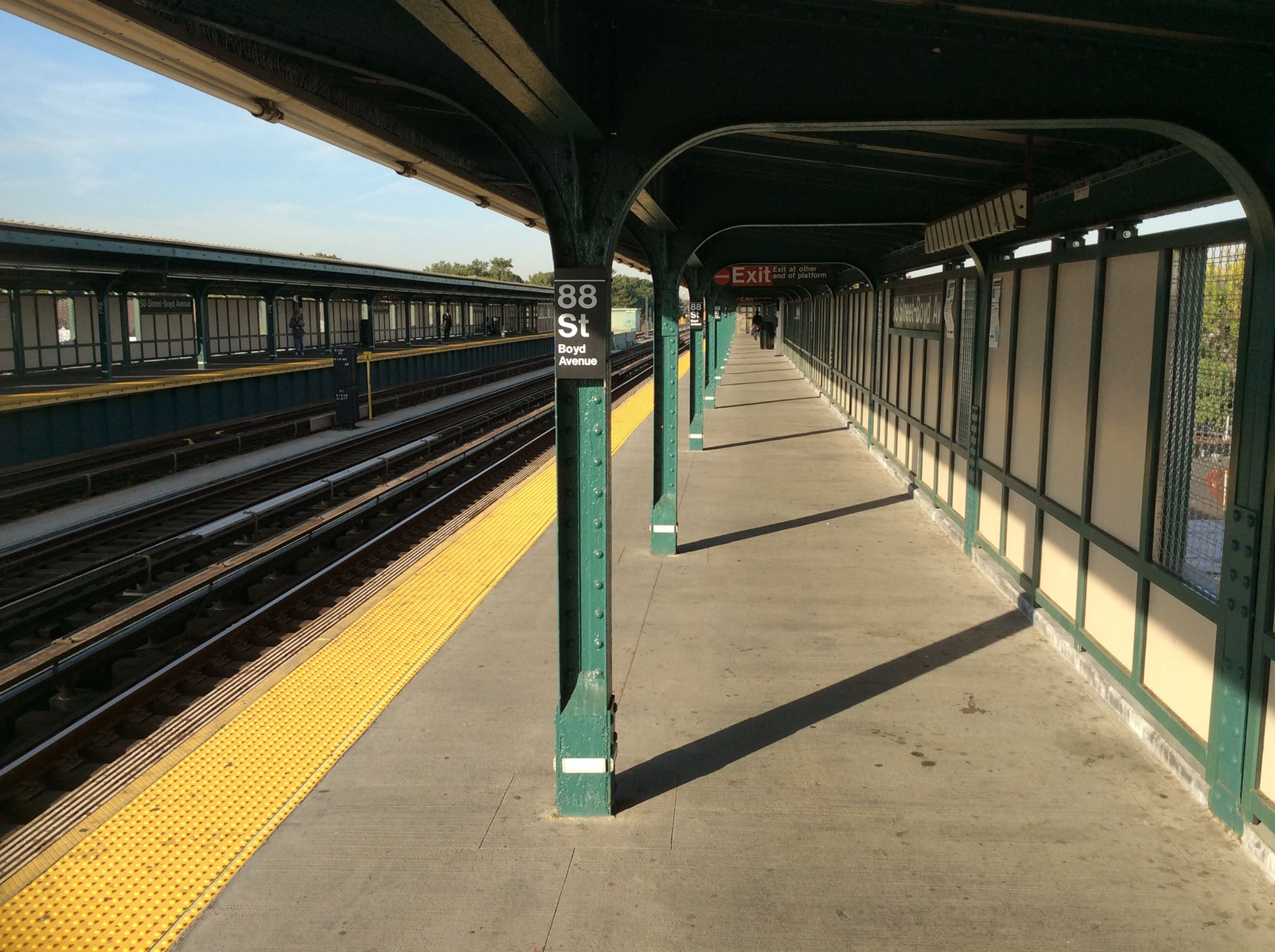
- Brooklyn-bound platform

Station statistics
- Address: 88th Street and Liberty Avenue; Queens, New York
- Borough: Queens
- Locale: Ozone Park
- Coordinates: 40.679857°N 73.850968°W
- Division: B (IND, formerly BMT)
- Line: IND Fulton Street Line; BMT Fulton Street Line (formerly)
- Services: A (all times)
- Structure: Elevated
- Platforms: 2 side platforms
- Tracks: 3 (2 in regular service)

Other information
- Opened: September 25, 1915; 111 years ago
- Accessible: No; planned
- Former/other names: 88th Street–Boyd Avenue

Traffic
- 2025: 616,069 ▲7.9%
- Rank: 368 out of 423
Services
Preceding station	New York City Subway	Following station
80th Street toward Inwood–207th Street	Local	Rockaway Boulevard toward Far Rockaway–Mott Avenue or Ozone Park–Lefferts Boulevard
Location
Location within New York City Subway
Location within New York City
Location within New York
Track layout
Street map
Station service legend
Symbol	Description
Stops all times	Stops all times

The 88th Street station (signed as the 88th Street–Boyd Avenue station) is a local station on the IND Fulton Street Line of the New York City Subway. Located on Liberty Avenue at 88th Street in Ozone Park, Queens, it is served by the A train at all times.

== History ==
88th Street was one of the six stations along Liberty Avenue in Queens, from 80th Street through Ozone Park–Lefferts Boulevard, as well as the current three track elevated structure, built for the BMT Fulton Street Line in 1915 as part of BMT's portion of the Dual Contracts. The connection to the BMT was severed on April 26, 1956, and the IND was extended east (railroad south) from Euclid Avenue via a connecting tunnel and new intermediate station at Grant Avenue, with the new service beginning on April 29, 1956.

The station was completely renovated in 2014. The project, which was part of a $39 million program to renovate five stations from 80th Street to 111th Street, involved closing each platform for several months at a time. As part of its 2025–2029 Capital Program, the MTA has proposed making the station wheelchair-accessible in compliance with the Americans with Disabilities Act of 1990.

== Station layout ==
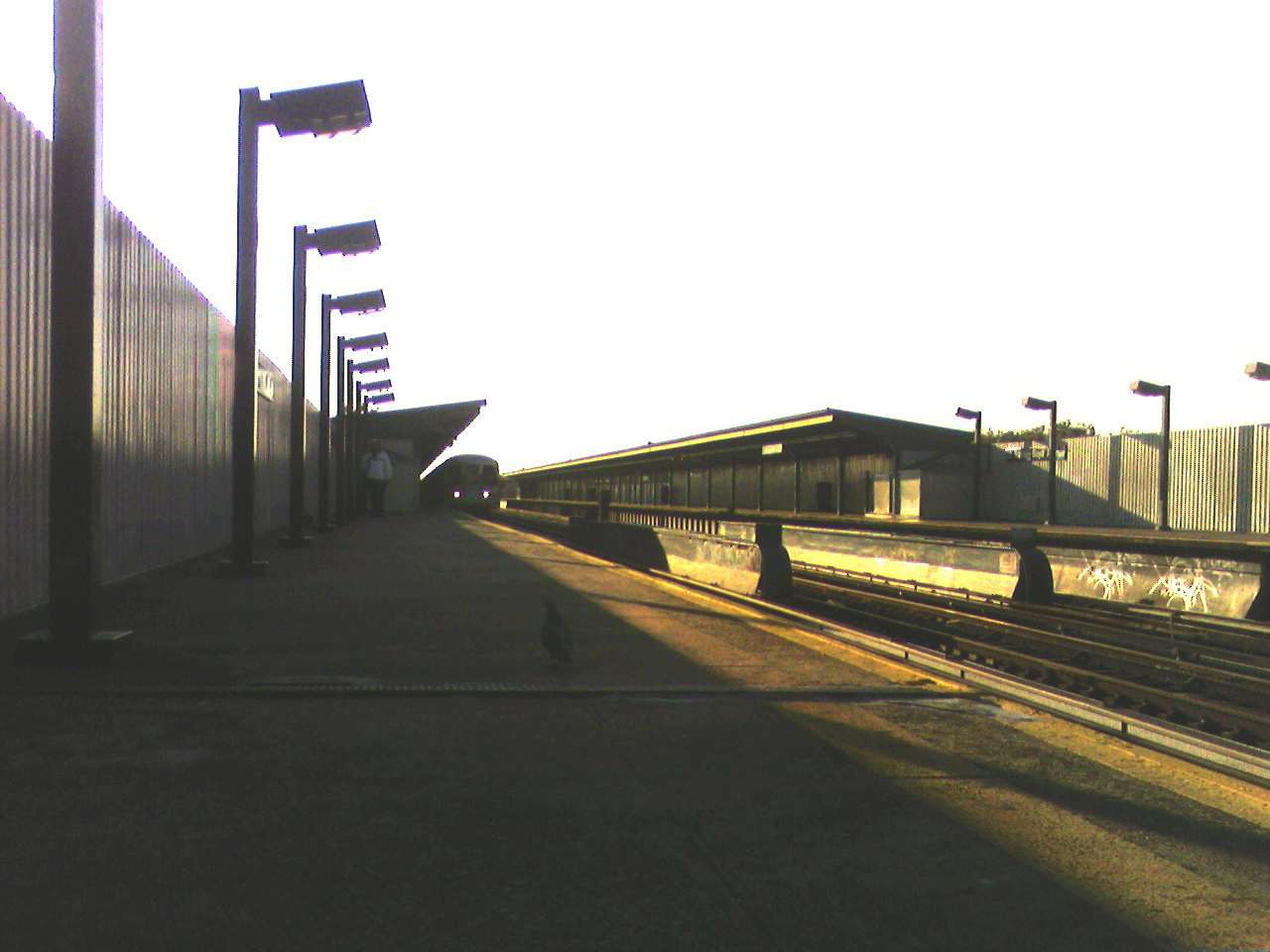
Station before renovation.

This elevated station, opened on September 25, 1915, has two side platforms and three tracks with the center track not used in revenue service. The A train stops here at all times; a shuttle train from Euclid Avenue to Ozone Park–Lefferts Boulevard also serves the station during late nights. The station is between Rockaway Boulevard to the east (railroad south) and 80th Street to the west (railroad north).

Both platforms have beige windscreens for their length and brown canopies with green frames and support columns except for a small section at either ends. Station signs display Boyd Avenue, which was the original name of this station.

The 2015 artwork at this station, MORPHING88, was designed by Haresh Lalvani.

=== Exits ===
This station's only entrance/exit is an elevated station house below the platforms at the east (railroad south) end. Inside fare control, there is one staircase to each platform, a waiting area that allows a free transfer between directions, and a turnstile bank. Outside fare control, there is a token booth and two street stairs going down to either eastern corners of 88th Street and Liberty Avenue.

This station formerly had another entrance/exit at the west (railroad north) end that went down to 86th Street. Each platform still has a closed-off staircase to the station house beneath the tracks, but the station house has no staircases to the street.
