= 111th Street station (IND Fulton Street Line) =

New York City Subway station in Queens

111 Street
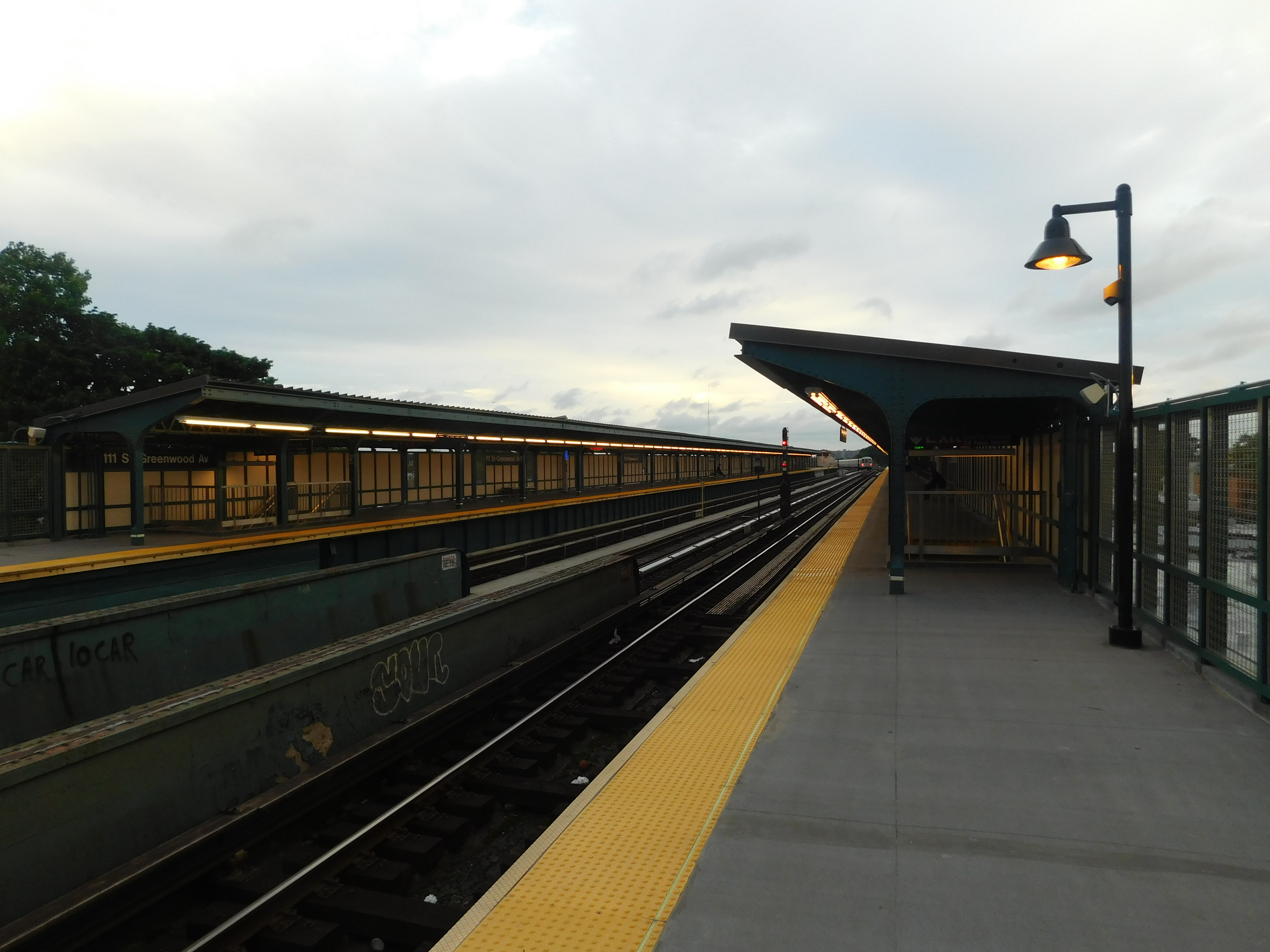
- 111th Street station in June 2018

Station statistics
- Address: 111th Street and Liberty Avenue; Queens, New York
- Borough: Queens
- Locale: South Ozone Park; South Richmond Hill
- Coordinates: 40.684673°N 73.831129°W
- Division: B (IND, formerly BMT)
- Line: IND Fulton Street Line; BMT Fulton Street Line (formerly)
- Services: A (all times)
- Transit: MTA Bus: Q37/B, Q112
- Structure: Elevated
- Platforms: 2 side platforms
- Tracks: 3 (2 in regular service)

Other information
- Opened: September 25, 1915 (111 years ago)
- Former/other names: 111th Street–Greenwood Avenue

Traffic
- 2025: 456,802 ▼0.1%
- Rank: 399 out of 423
Services
Preceding station	New York City Subway	Following station
104th Street–Oxford Avenue toward Inwood–207th Street	Local	Ozone Park–Lefferts Boulevard Terminus
Location
Location within New York City Subway
Location within New York City
Location within New York
Track layout
Street map
Station service legend
Symbol	Description
Stops all times	Stops all times

The 111th Street station (signed as the 111th Street–Greenwood Avenue station) is a local station on the IND Fulton Street Line of the New York City Subway, located on Liberty Avenue at 111th Street in South Ozone Park and South Richmond Hill, Queens. The station is served by the Lefferts Boulevard A train at all times.

== History ==
111th Street was one of the six stations along Liberty Avenue in Queens, from 80th Street through Ozone Park–Lefferts Boulevard, as well as the current three track elevated structure, built for the BMT Fulton Street Line in 1915 as part of BMT's portion of the Dual Contracts. The connection to the BMT was severed on April 26, 1956, and the IND was extended east (railroad south) from Euclid Avenue via a connecting tunnel and new intermediate station at Grant Avenue, with the new service beginning on April 29, 1956. The Fulton Street Elevated west of Hudson Street was closed, and eventually demolished.

The station has gone by a number of different names. It opened as Greenwood Avenue. A 1924 system map portrayed the station as "Greenwood Avenue" with "111th St." below it in parentheses and smaller print. By 1948, "Greenwood" and "111 St." were shown in equal sizes, and by 1959, the station's name was shown as "111 St–Greenwood". The current official map shows the name as just "111 St". However, station signs still show "111th Street–Greenwood Avenue".

The Lefferts Boulevard-bound platform was completely renovated in 2015 and reopened on December 12. The Brooklyn-bound platform was completely rehabilitated and reopened in Spring 2016. The project, which was part of a $39 million program to renovate five stations from 80th Street to 111th Street, involved closing each platform for several months at a time.

== Station layout ==
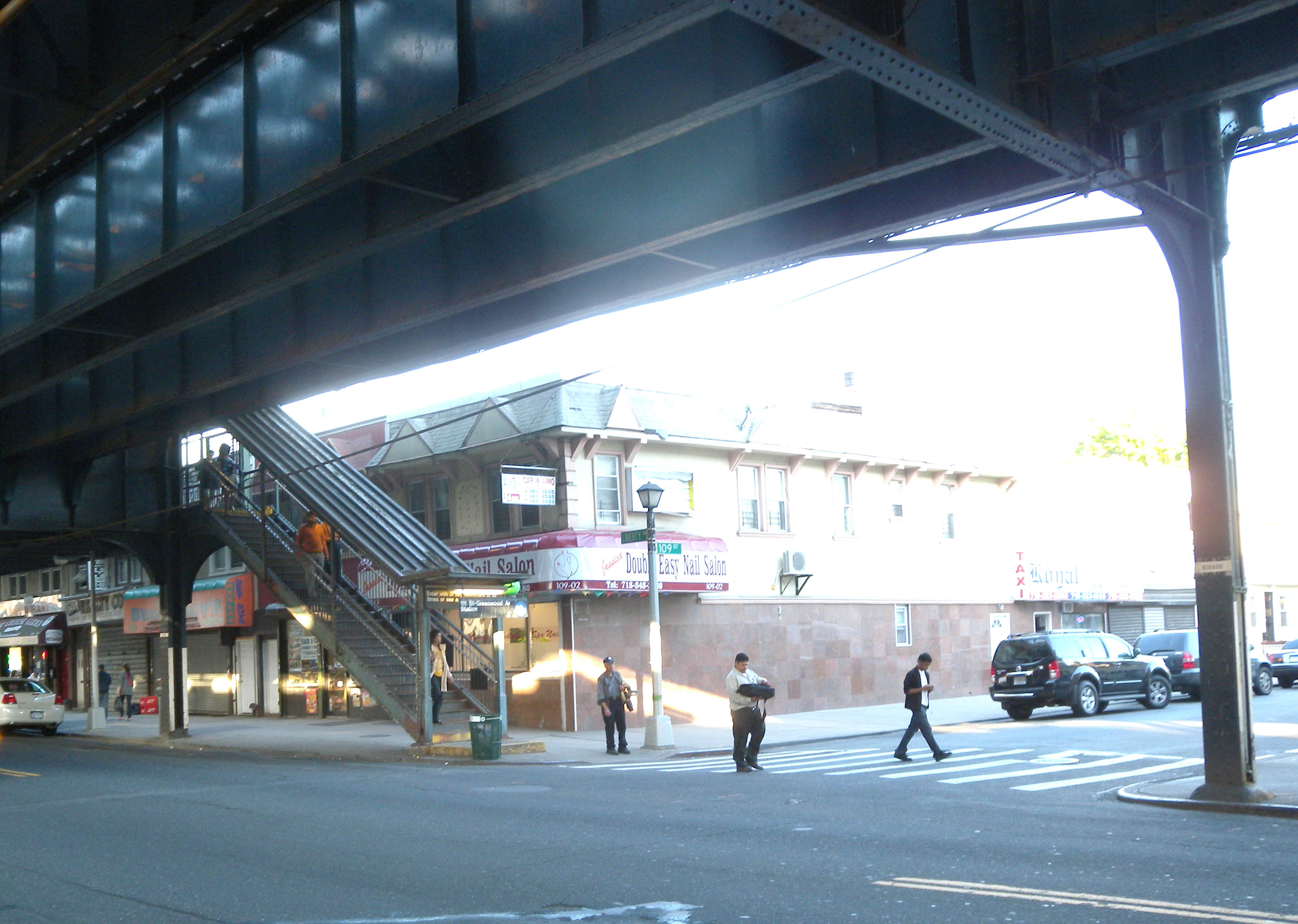
Southwest street stair on the southeast corner of Liberty Avenue and 109th Street

This elevated station, opened on September 25, 1915, has three tracks and two side platforms, with the middle track not used in revenue service. The A train stops here at all times except nights, running to Brooklyn and Manhattan; a shuttle train from Euclid Avenue to Ozone Park–Lefferts Boulevard serves the station during late nights. The next and last stop to the east (railroad south) is Lefferts Boulevard, while the next stop to the west (railroad north) is 104th Street.

Both platforms have beige windscreens for the entire length and brown canopies with green frames and support columns except for a small section at either ends.

=== Exits ===
This station has two entrances/exits, both of which are elevated station houses beneath the tracks. The full-time side is at the east (railroad south) end. It has one staircase to each platform, a waiting area that allows a free transfer between directions, a turnstile bank, a token booth, and two staircases down to either eastern corners of Liberty Avenue and 111th Street. The other station house also has one staircase to each platform, waiting area, and two staircases to 109th Street and Liberty Avenue (one to the southeast corner and another along the north side of Liberty Avenue). However, this entrance/exit is unstaffed, containing just high entry/exit and exit-only turnstiles.
