= Grant Avenue station =

Grant Avenue station may refer to:

- Grant Avenue (IND Fulton Street Line)
- Grant Avenue (BMT Fulton Street Line)
