= 80th Street station (IND Fulton Street Line) =

New York City Subway station in Queens

80 Street
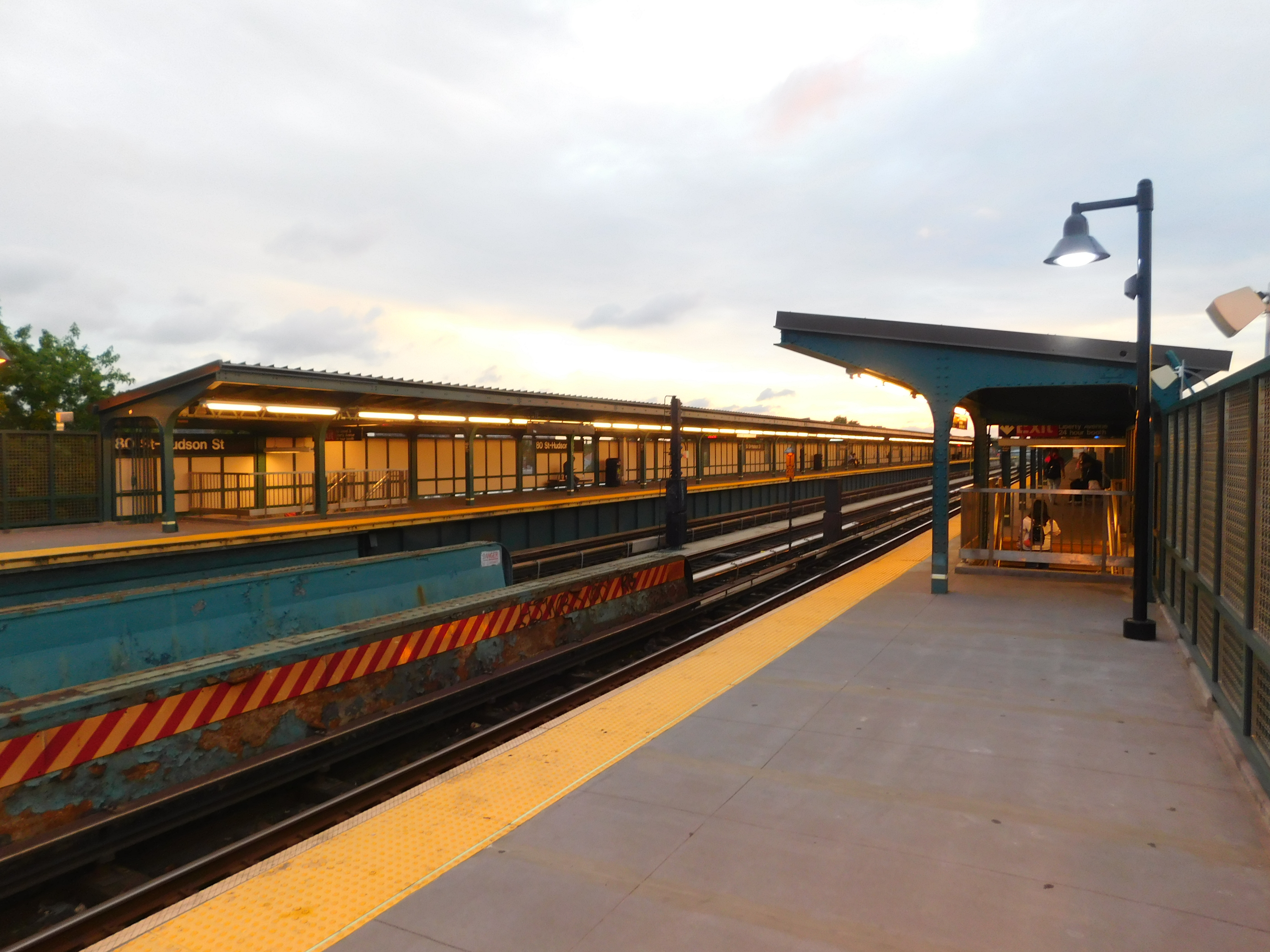
- Platforms after renovation

Station statistics
- Address: 80th Street and Liberty Avenue; Queens, New York
- Borough: Queens
- Locale: Ozone Park
- Coordinates: 40.679434°N 73.857822°W
- Division: B (IND, formerly BMT)
- Line: IND Fulton Street Line; BMT Fulton Street Line (formerly)
- Services: A (all times)
- Transit: MTA Bus: Q8
- Structure: Elevated
- Platforms: 2 side platforms
- Tracks: 3 (2 in regular service)

Other information
- Opened: September 25, 1915; 111 years ago
- Former/other names: 80th Street–Hudson Street

Traffic
- 2025: 954,592 ▲8.6%
- Rank: 320 out of 423
Services
Preceding station	New York City Subway	Following station
Grant Avenue toward Inwood–207th Street	Local	88th Street toward Far Rockaway–Mott Avenue or Ozone Park–Lefferts Boulevard
Non-revenue services and lines
Preceding station	New York City Subway	Following station
Grant Avenue BMT Fulton; demolished	no service	
Location
Location within New York City Subway
Location within New York City
Location within New York
Track layout
Street map
Station service legend
Symbol	Description
Stops all times	Stops all times

The 80th Street station (signed as the 80th Street–Hudson Street station) is a local station on the IND Fulton Street Line of the New York City Subway. Located on Liberty Avenue at 80th Street in Ozone Park, Queens, it is served by the A train at all times.

== History ==
80th Street, which opened on September 25, 1915, was one of the eight stations along Liberty Avenue in Brooklyn and Queens built for the BMT Fulton Street Line. The first two, Crescent Street and Grant Avenue in Brooklyn, were the last two stations on the line from 1894 to 1915. In 1915, the BMT, under their portion of the Dual Contracts, added the current three-track elevated structure along the Queens section of Liberty Avenue, which is now the only remnant of the line. It ran the previous terminus at Grant Avenue to the present Ozone Park–Lefferts Boulevard station, adding six new stations overall.

The connection from this station west (railroad north) to the BMT el was severed on April 26, 1956. To replace that service, the underground IND line was extended east (railroad south) from its previous terminus at Euclid Avenue via a new connecting tunnel and ramp. An intermediate station, also called Grant Avenue, was built along this tunnel, right before the point where the track was then elevated to connect to the remaining sections of the BMT el. This service began on April 29, 1956.

The station was completely renovated in 2014. The project, which was part of a $39 million program to renovate five stations from 80th Street to 111th Street, involved closing each platform for several months at a time.

== Station layout ==
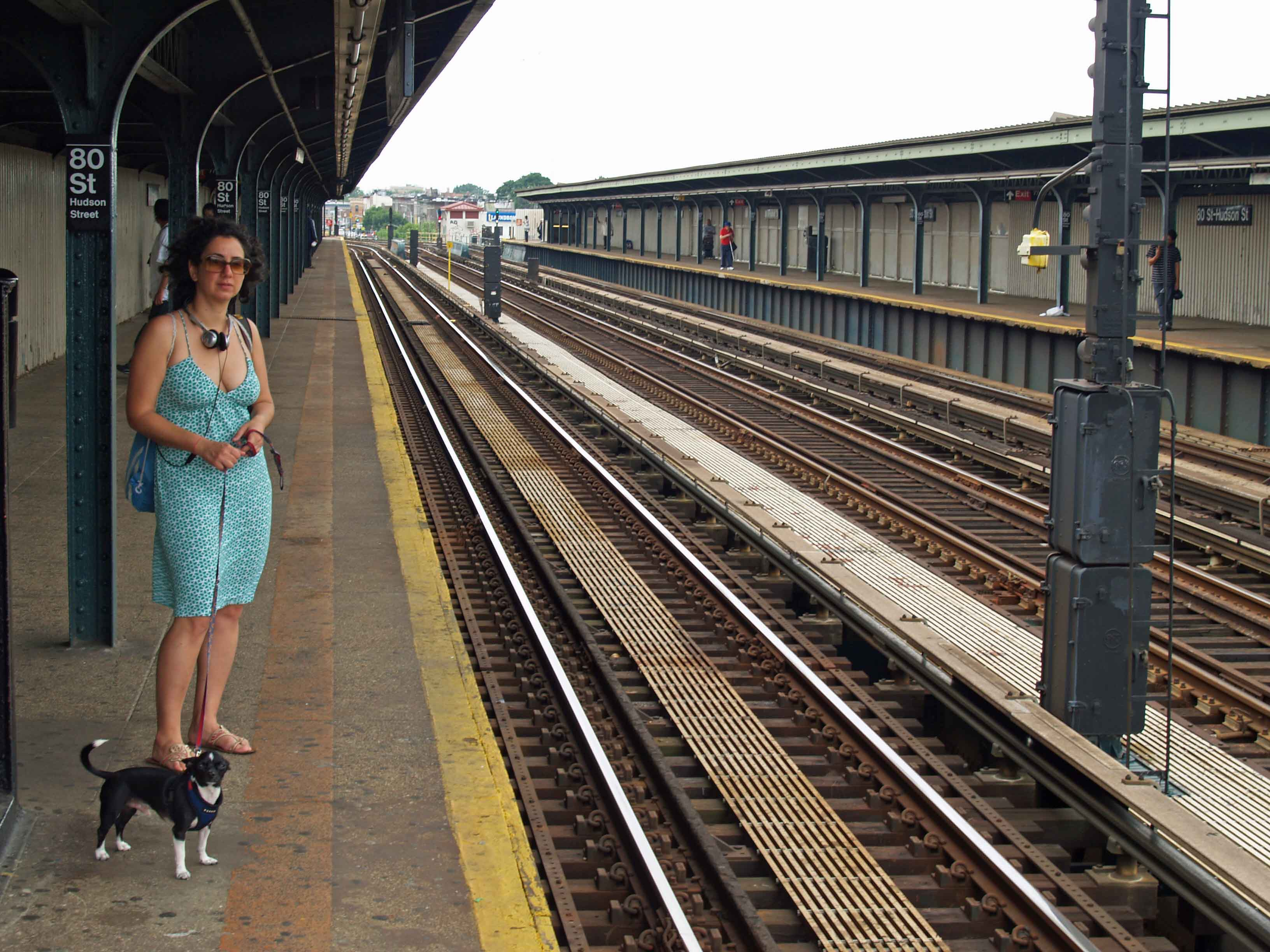
Platforms before renovation

This elevated station has two side platforms and three tracks, but the center track is not used in revenue service. It is the westernmost (railroad north) station in Queens on the IND Fulton Street Line. The A train stops here at all times; a shuttle train from Euclid Avenue to Ozone Park–Lefferts Boulevard also serves the station during late nights. The station is between 88th Street to the east (railroad south) and Grant Avenue in Brooklyn to the west (railroad north).

Both platforms have beige windscreens along their entire lengths and brown canopies with green frames and support columns except for a small section at either ends. Platform signs display 80 Street–Hudson Street, which was the original name of this station.

=== Exits ===
This station has two entrances/exits, both of which are elevated station houses beneath the tracks. The full-time one is at the south (geographical east) end of the station. Inside fare control, there is one staircase to each platform, a waiting area that allows a free transfer between directions, and a turnstile bank. Outside fare control, there is a token booth and two street stairs going down to either western corners of the T-intersection of 80th Street and Liberty Avenue.

The station's other entrance/exit at the north (geographical west) end also has one staircase to each platform, a waiting area, and two street stairs going down to either western corners of 77th Street and Liberty Avenue. The station house, however, is unstaffed, containing just two High Entry/Exit Turnstiles. Each staircase landing has an exit-only turnstile to allow passengers to exit the station without having to go through the station house.

== Track layout ==
The station has three tracks: two outer tracks that stop at the station, and one center track that bypasses the station. Part of the trackways to the BMT el still remain as this line curves south into the tunnel to Grant Avenue west of 80th Street. This segment can be found just east of the intersection of Liberty Avenue and 76th Street, as the newer structure curves south; an older part of the structure, which does not curve, continues for a few feet, with no tracks, on the north side of Liberty Avenue. The line enters the tunnel portal at the Brooklyn–Queens border.

As the tracks curve toward the tunnel, the center track dips to a lower level from the outer tracks and becomes a yard lead into Pitkin Yard; the eastbound track similarly splits, with one track coming from the tunnel and the other from the yard.

East of the station are a pair of diamond crossovers. They allow trains to bypass 88th Street, the next station, and Rockaway Boulevard, the following station. However, only trains heading to the Rockaways (as opposed to Lefferts Boulevard) can use this track because there are no switches east of Rockaway Boulevard to allow those trains back onto the outer tracks to get to the tracks headed to Lefferts Boulevard.
