= Crescent Street station =

Crescent Street station may refer to:

- Crescent Street station (BMT Fulton Street Line), a station on the demolished BMT Fulton Street Line
- Crescent Street station (BMT Jamaica Line), a station on the BMT Jamaica Line
