= Grant Avenue station (BMT Fulton Street Line) =

Grant Avenue
- Former New York City Subway station

Station statistics
- Address: Liberty Avenue and Grant Avenue; Brooklyn, New York 11208
- Borough: Brooklyn
- Locale: City Line
- Coordinates: 40.678848°N 73.866082°W
- Division: B (BMT)
- Services: BMT Fulton Street Line
- Structure: Elevated
- Platforms: 1 island platform
- Tracks: 2

Other information
- Opened: July 16, 1894; 131 years ago
- Closed: April 26, 1956; 69 years ago
- Former/other names: City Line

Station succession
- Next west: Crescent Street
- Next east: Hudson Street–80th Street
Location

Street map
Station service legend
Symbol	Description
Stops all times	Stops in station at all times
Stops all times except late nights	Stops all times except late nights
Stops late nights only	Stops late nights only
Stops late nights and weekends	Stops late nights and weekends only
Stops weekdays during the day	Stops weekdays during the day
Stops weekends during the day	Stops weekends during the day
Stops all times except rush hours in the peak direction	Stops all times except rush hours in the peak direction
Stops all times except weekdays in the peak direction	Stops all times except weekdays in the peak direction
Stops daily except rush hours in the peak direction	Stops all times except nights and rush hours in the peak direction
Stops rush hours only	Stops rush hours only
Stops rush hours in the peak direction only	Stops rush hours in the peak direction only
Station closed	Station is closed
(Details about time periods)

The Grant Avenue station was a station on the demolished BMT Fulton Street Line in Brooklyn, New York City. It had two tracks and one island platform. The station opened on July 16, 1894, as City Line station, and was the eastern terminal of the line until September 25, 1915, when Hudson Street – 80th Street opened and the line was extended to Lefferts Avenue – 119th Street. The next stop to the west was Crescent Street. It closed on April 26, 1956, and was replaced by the nearby underground Grant Avenue station of the IND Fulton Street Line 1½ blocks south on April 29, 1956. The remainder of the line east to Lefferts Avenue (today Lefferts Boulevard) was connected to the Fulton Street subway and continues to operate.

When opened in 1894, the station was labeled as City Line station on some maps, as this station was close to the border of Queens County, and the train terminated a block short of where the City of Brooklyn (and Kings County) ended.
