= Crescent Street station (BMT Fulton Street Line) =

Crescent Street
- Former New York City Subway station

Station statistics
- Address: Liberty Avenue and Crescent Street; Brooklyn, New York 11208
- Borough: Brooklyn
- Locale: East New York
- Coordinates: 40.678182°N 73.870685°W
- Division: B (BMT)
- Line: BMT Fulton Street Line
- Services: None
- Structure: Elevated
- Platforms: 2 side platforms
- Tracks: 2

Other information
- Opened: July 16, 1894; 131 years ago
- Closed: April 26, 1956; 69 years ago

Station succession
- Next west: Chestnut Street
- Next east: Grant Avenue
Location

Street map

The Crescent Street station was a station on the demolished BMT Fulton Street Line in Brooklyn, New York City. It had two tracks and two side platforms. It was served by trains of the BMT Fulton Street Line. The next stop to the east was Grant Avenue. The station was opened on July 16, 1894, and is one of three stations to extend the Fulton Street Line closer to Queens. The next stop to the west was Chestnut Street. On November 28, 1948, the Independent Subway System built the underground Euclid Avenue Subway station three blocks south then two blocks west after years of war-time construction delays. This station rendered both Crescent Street station and the nearby Chestnut Street station obsolete, and it closed on April 26, 1956.

An historical remnant of the station is the set-back property line along Crescent Street, where station access had been provided.
