= Euclid Avenue station (IND Fulton Street Line) =

New York City Subway station in Brooklyn

Euclid Avenue
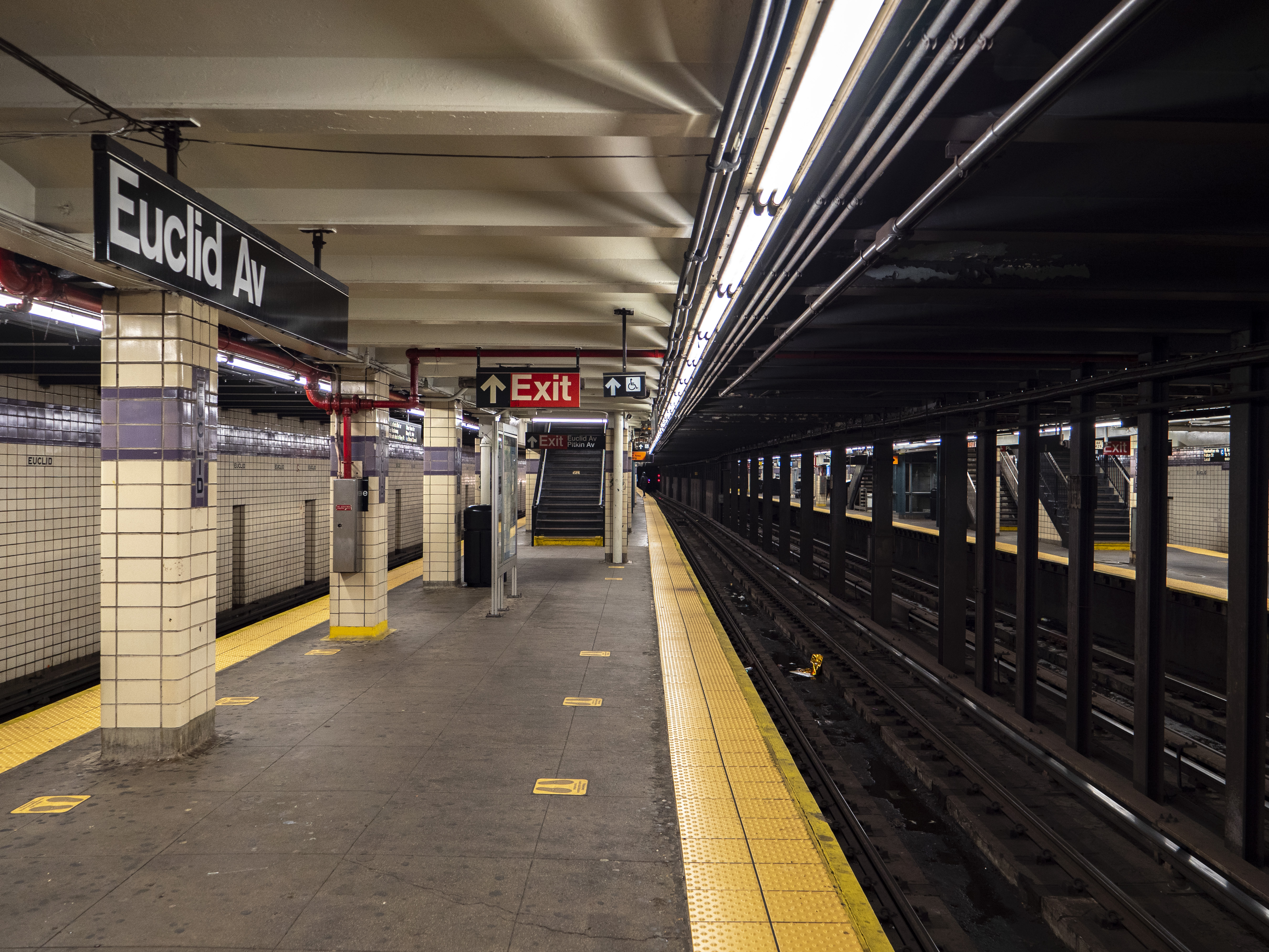
- View from southbound platform

Station statistics
- Address: Euclid Avenue & Pitkin Avenue; Brooklyn, New York
- Borough: Brooklyn
- Locale: East New York
- Coordinates: 40.6754°N 73.8719°W
- Division: B (IND)
- Line: IND Fulton Street Line
- Services: A (all times); C (all except late nights)
- Transit: NYCT Bus: B13; MTA Bus: Q8, Q112
- Structure: Underground
- Platforms: 2 island platforms cross-platform interchange
- Tracks: 4

Other information
- Opened: November 28, 1948; 77 years ago
- Accessible: Yes

Traffic
- 2025: 2,108,580 ▼2.7%
- Rank: 173 out of 423
Services
Preceding station	New York City Subway	Following station
Broadway Junction A toward Inwood–207th Street	Express	Grant Avenue A toward Far Rockaway–Mott Avenue or Ozone Park–Lefferts Boulevard
Shepherd Avenue A C toward 168th Street	Local	Terminus
Location
Location within New York City Subway
Location within New York City
Location within New York
Track layout
Street map
Station service legend
Symbol	Description
Stops all times except late nights	Stops all times except late nights
Stops all times	Stops all times
Stops late nights only	Stops late nights only

The Euclid Avenue station is an express station on the IND Fulton Street Line of the New York City Subway, located at the intersection of Euclid and Pitkin Avenues in East New York, Brooklyn. It is served by the A train at all times and is the southern terminal for the C train at all times except nights. During nights, this is the northern terminal for the Lefferts Boulevard shuttle train from Ozone Park, Queens.

Construction on the Euclid Avenue station started in 1938, but this part of the Fulton Street Line did not open until 1948. The Fulton Street Line was extended to the east in 1956, connecting to the Fulton Street Elevated via a branch line that runs through the Grant Avenue station. Elevators were installed at Euclid Avenue circa 2005.

The station has four tracks and two island platforms. In terms of railroad directions, this is the southernmost station on the Fulton Street Line. The line was originally planned to extend further east as a four-track underground line; however, the four-track extension was never built. East of the station, there are connections to the Pitkin Yard as well as to the Fulton Street Elevated. The tracks themselves dead-end after the Fulton Street elevated spur diverges.

== History ==
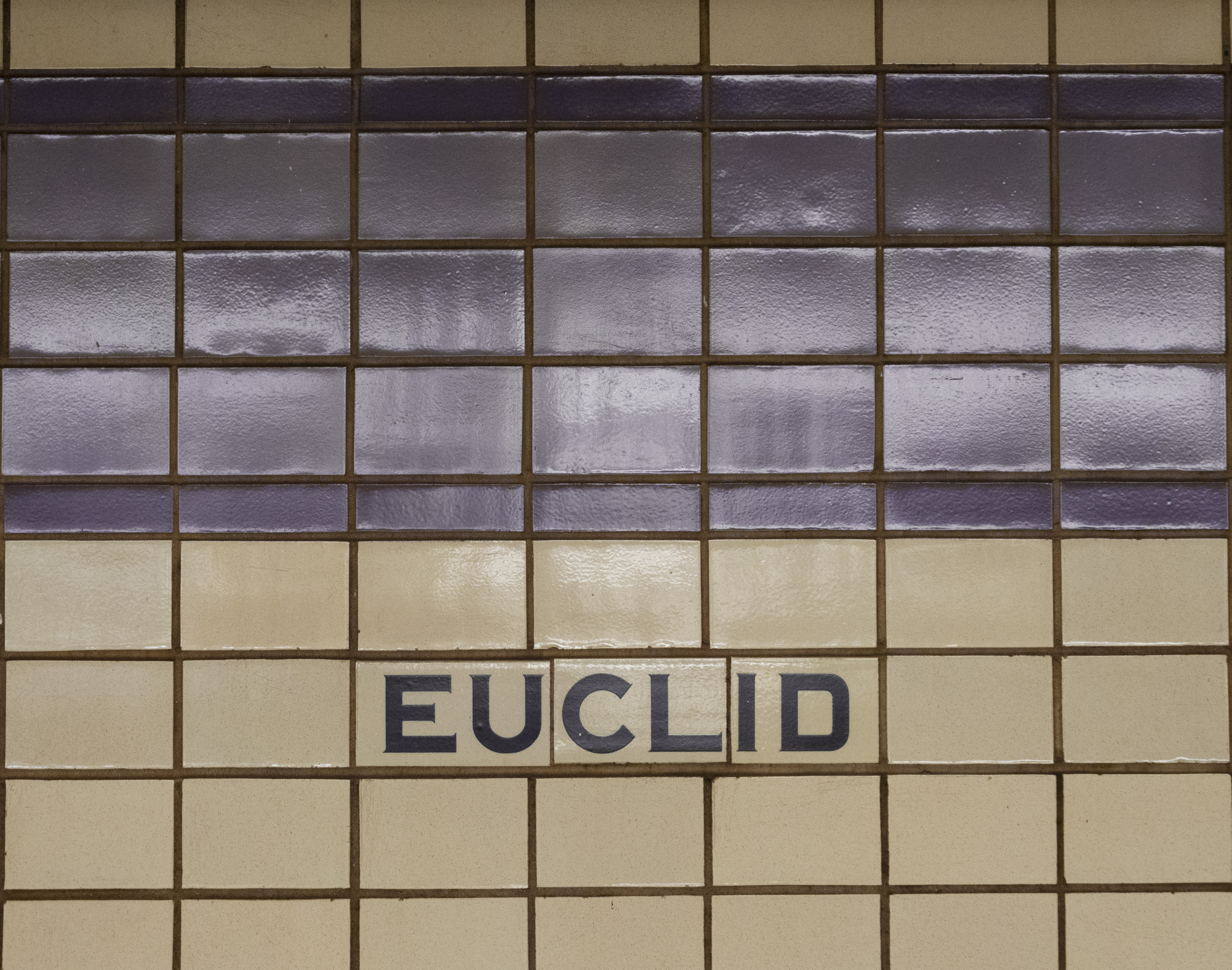
Track wall tile caption and trim line

Euclid Avenue was part of a four-station extension of the Fulton Street subway along Pitkin Avenue, past its original planned terminus at Broadway Junction. Construction of the extension began in 1938. Work on the section of the line between Crystal Street and Grant Avenue, which included the Euclid Avenue station and the Pitkin Yard, began in late 1940. On August 26, 1941, lightning from a severe thunderstorm damaged the temporary timber roofing over the construction site at Pitkin Avenue and Autumn Avenue just east of the station. The lighting also ruptured a gas main at the site, creating a fire and causing damage to an adjacent building, while two automobiles fell into the exposed tunnel cavern. Construction of the extension was halted in December 1942 due to material shortages caused by World War II. At the time, the section of tunnel between Crystal Street and Grant Avenue was 96% complete. Other parts of the extension were more than 99% complete, but vital equipment had yet to be installed, precluding these stations' openings.

Construction resumed on the extension in November 1946. The delay meant the station received different design features than the rest of the stations along the line, including different tilings, fluorescent lighting instead of then-standard incandescent lights, and improved restroom and phone booth facilities. The station also featured a then-modern interlocking technology, known as the "NX" system, wherein train operators would press buttons that automatically adjusted the corresponding switches. In older interlockings throughout the subway system, workers in a separate control tower had to manually adjust the switches using a series of levers within the tower.

After several test runs, the station opened to the public in the early morning of November 28, 1948. It became the new terminal of the Fulton Street Line, replacing the former terminal at Broadway–East New York (now Broadway Junction). It later became the replacement for the elevated BMT Fulton Street Line's Chestnut Street and Crescent Street stations, which closed on April 26, 1956 when the connection to the eastern Fulton elevated was opened.

In July 2002, the Metropolitan Transportation Authority announced that elevators would be installed at the Euclid Avenue station to make the station ADA-accessible. A $6.9 million contract for three elevators was awarded to Gibraltar Contracting. There would be an elevator to the street and elevators between the mezzanine and each platform had been installed, making the station ADA-accessible. As of October 2005, the project's initial completion date of April 2005 was pushed back twice, and it was over six months behind schedule. The entire cost of the project had increased from $14.1 million to $14.3 million. The project was completed by March 2006.

== Station layout ==
This station has four tracks and two island platforms. It is the easternmost express station on the IND Fulton Street Line in terms of geographic directions. In terms of railroad directions, Euclid Avenue is the line's southernmost express station. The station is served by the A at all times and by the C except at night. The C is always local, while the A runs express during the day and local during the night. The station is the southern terminus for C trains; the next stop to the east (railroad south) is Grant Avenue for A trains, while the next stop to the west (railroad north) is Shepherd Avenue for local trains and Broadway Junction for express trains. During the night, Euclid Avenue is also the northern terminus for shuttle trains from Ozone Park–Lefferts Boulevard, one of the three southern termini of the daytime A train.

The track walls have the same rectangular eggshell-beige wall tiles as the next three stations west, in contrast to the typical square white tiles seen in the rest of the IND. The tile band, however, is a delicate shade of lilac with a violet border. The I-beam columns are tiled the same way, along with mini-vertical name tablets reading "EUCLID" along with the two-tone border motif. These columns are in pairs at the center of the platforms, though towards each end where the platforms narrow, there's only a single row of columns. A crew quarters room is over the railroad south end of both platforms. The station has a crossover in the mezzanine along with an active newsstand and elevators to both platforms.

The station has a control tower at the eastern end of the southbound platform, which monitors trains between Broadway Junction and the station, and controls the interlockings east of Euclid Avenue. The tower was the first in the subway system to use the "NX" or "Entrance-Exit" system. In this system, the tower utilizes a 12-foot (3.7 m) wide, 3.3-foot (1.0 m) tall electric light signal board, which features a diagram of the nearby stations and track layout. It operates on direct current and consists of simple knobs and push buttons to control track switches, as opposed to the previous system, which ran on alternating current and required a complicated series of levers.

Northwest stair entrance

=== Exits ===
Stairways are present from each platform to the mezzanine above the tracks. Fare control is located in the mezzanine. Outside fare control is a street elevator leading to the northeast corner of Pitkin and Euclid Avenues. Street stairs also lead to all four corners of the intersection. The Q8, Q112 and B13 bus routes stop outside the station.

== East of the station ==
The next station east (railroad south) for IND Fulton Street service is Grant Avenue, located in City Line, Brooklyn. However, an unfinished station is rumored to exist at 76th Street in nearby Ozone Park, Queens, just four blocks east of Grant Avenue.

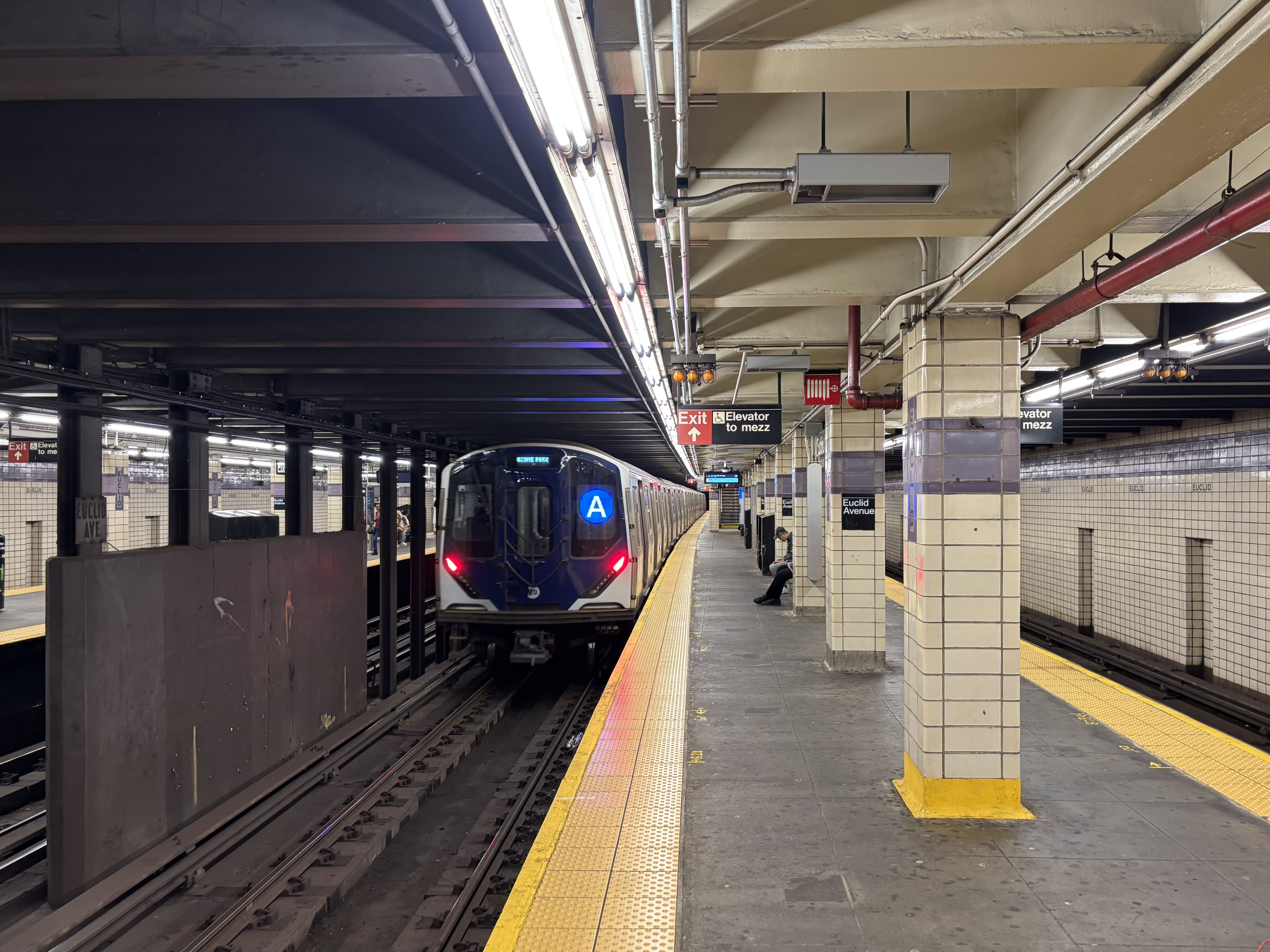
R211A A train departing from the southbound platform

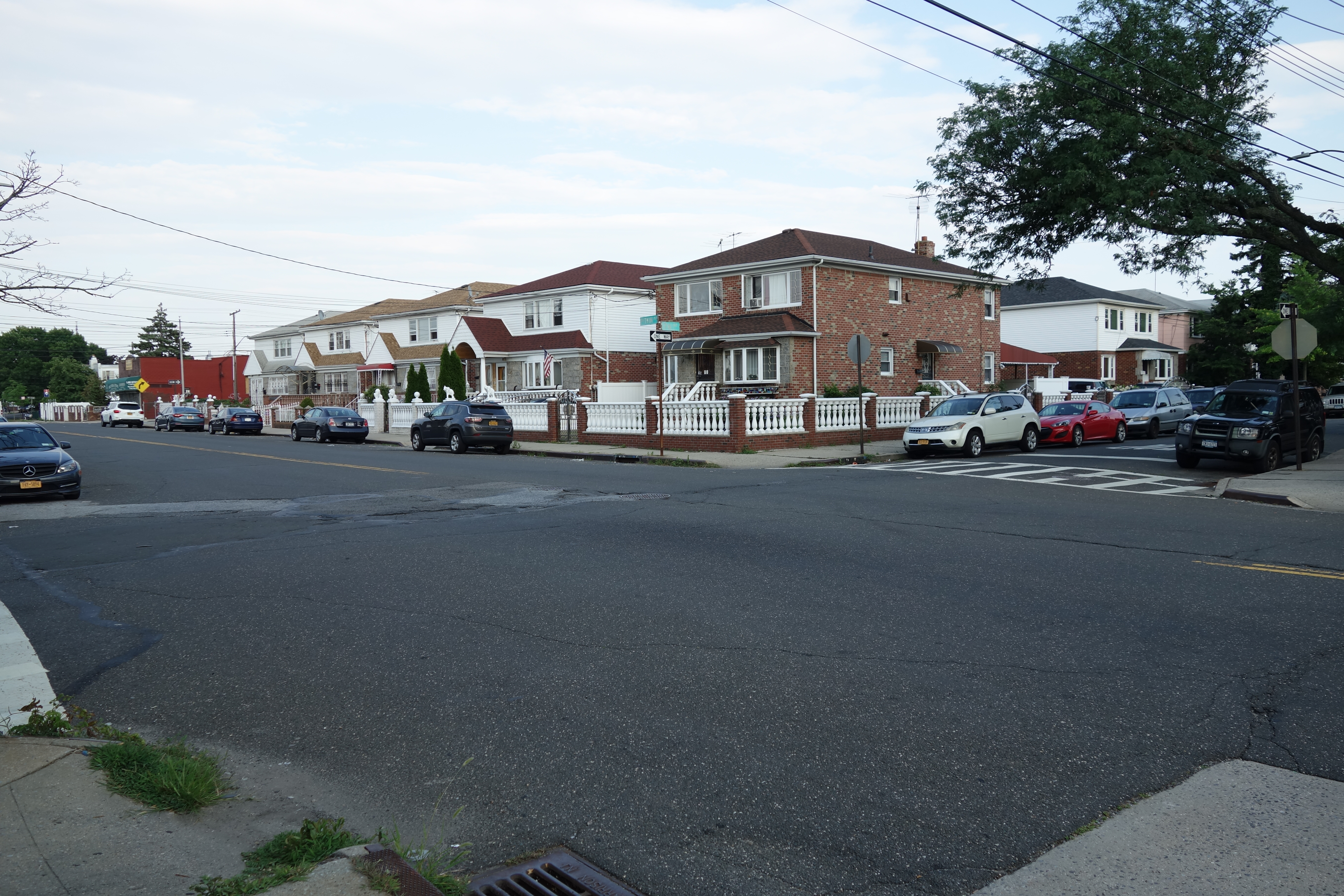
The site of the planned station at 76th Street in Ozone Park, Queens

The track work near Euclid Avenue is intricate, allowing trains to enter the Pitkin Yard from both the express and local tracks (where C trains relay to get from the southbound to the northbound local track), and with connections to the two-track Grant Avenue station from both the express and local tracks; the Grant Avenue spur then veers northeast towards Liberty Avenue. All four mainline tracks continue below the Grant Avenue connection, used only to store trains, east under Pitkin Avenue until approximately Eldert Lane (just south of the Grant Avenue station). It was planned that these tracks would continue under Pitkin Avenue to Cross Bay Boulevard, as part of a never-built system expansion which would have extended the Fulton Street Subway to the Rockaways and to Cambria Heights near the Queens–Nassau County border. On the electric light signal board in the control room at Euclid Avenue, there is a taped-over section of the board that hides the 76th Street station. There are also two tracks coming from the Pitkin Yard heading towards the planned 76th Street station site. These tracks would have merged with the mainline tracks just before 76th Street station. When Pitkin Yard originally opened, the yard leads toward 76th Street were usable to relay short trains on. Today, those two tracks are no longer connected via switches. Parts of the trackways still exist, but the switches were removed and the tunnel ends in a cinderblock wall.

As late as 1951, the mainline and relay tracks were still planned to be extended as far as 105th Street (the modern location of Aqueduct Racetrack), with a connection to the then-recently abandoned Rockaway Beach Branch of the Long Island Rail Road east of Cross Bay Boulevard. The extension of the subway, however, was never built; instead the line was connected to the former Fulton Street elevated on Liberty Avenue and the former LIRR Rockaway branch (now the IND Rockaway Line), both via the Grant Avenue station, which opened in 1956.

Rumors that the proposed station was actually constructed, at least partially, are prevalent. Evidence supporting the existence of the station includes the signal board, the cinderblock wall at the end of the tunnel (cinderblock, brick, and wooden partitions are used in other parts of the subway to seal potential expansion sites), and several signals for trains running from the station into Euclid Avenue facing the wall, including one directly in front of the wall. On online transit forums, such as the website SubChat, some have claimed to have known people who have seen the station. The New York Times, referring to the rumor as the "transit Atlantis", has likened it to the Roswell UFO incident or the Kennedy assassination conspiracy theories. Steve Krokowski, a retired transit worker and police officer, was quoted by the Times in reference to the station, mentioning:

- The taped-over portion of the signal board, which covers a label for the 76th Street station. (This control board actually exists, and has indeed been taped over.)
- The remnants of the Pitkin Yard leads that head northeast and then stop near the aforementioned cinder-block wall. Krokowski tried to dig under the wall, and found a track tie, but stopped when the hole caved in.
- A retired police officer claimed that the cinder-block wall previously had a door, and that in the 1960s, he walked through it, and saw a station complete with everything except for turnstiles and token booths. Other "colleagues", all supposedly dead, also claimed to have seen the station, though whether anyone else actually made such claims is unknown.

However, there is also significant evidence against the existence of the station, including a lack of newspaper coverage, the lack of subway infrastructure such as ventilation grates or skylights on Pitkin Avenue in the area, and the absence of documentation of the work from the Board of Transportation or the Board of Estimate.
