= IND Fulton Street Line =

New York City Subway line

- The IND Fulton Street Line is served by the A and C trains.

Overview
- Owner: City of New York
- Locale: Brooklyn and Queens, New York City
- Termini: Jay Street–MetroTech; Ozone Park–Lefferts Boulevard
- Stations: 22

Service
- Type: Rapid transit
- System: New York City Subway
- Operator: New York City Transit Authority
- Daily ridership: 102,615

History
- Opened: April 9, 1936; 90 years ago
- Last extension: 1956

Technical
- Num of tracks: 2-4
- Character: Underground (Brooklyn); Elevated (Queens)
- Track gauge: 4 ft 8 1/2 in (1,435 mm)
- Electrification: Direct Current traction
Route map
Express station	Local station

The IND Fulton Street Line is a rapid transit line of the IND Division of the New York City Subway, running from the Cranberry Street Tunnel under the East River through central Brooklyn to a terminus in Ozone Park, Queens. The IND Rockaway Line branches from it just east of Rockaway Boulevard. The A train runs express during daytime hours and local at night on the underground portion of the line; it runs local on the elevated portion of the line at all times. The C train runs local on the underground portion of the line at all times except late nights.

The line runs primarily along Fulton Street, Pitkin Avenue, and Liberty Avenue. The underground portion, which constitutes the majority of the line, was built for the city-owned Independent Subway System (IND), opening between 1936 and 1956. The elevated portion in Queens was originally part of the Brooklyn–Manhattan Transit Corporation (BMT)'s Fulton Street elevated line; the Elevated in Brooklyn was closed and demolished in stages with the opening of the subway line.

== Description and service ==
The following services use part or all of the IND Fulton Street Line:

Service		Between		
	Time period	Hoyt– Schermerhorn Sts Euclid Ave	Euclid Ave Rockaway Boulevard	Rockaway Boulevard Ozone Park–Lefferts Blvd
"A" train	All except nights	express	local	
"A" train	Late nights	local		shuttle
"C" train	All except nights	local	no service	
"C" train	Late nights	no service		

Under Fulton Street, the line is mainly single level, except at Nostrand Avenue, where the express tracks are on the upper level and the local tracks are on the lower level. During the subway line's construction in the late 1930s and early 1940s, the old, now-demolished BMT Fulton Street Elevated (which the IND line replaced) had to be supported.

The stations along Liberty Avenue in Queens, from 80th Street–Hudson Street through Ozone Park–Lefferts Boulevard, as well as the current three-track elevated structure, were built for the elevated Fulton Street Line in 1915 as part of the BMT's portion of the Dual Contracts. This was the only section of the Fulton El that was built specifically to handle steel subway cars, as opposed to lighter wooden elevated cars.

The current service pattern along the line is one of the newest in the New York City Subway system. Prior to December 1988, express service was only provided during rush hours, and before 1999, all trains ran local on weekends and weekday evenings after 9:00 pm. Since May 2, 1999, A trains run express along the line and C trains run local except during late nights, when A trains make all stops.

=== Route ===
Entering Brooklyn via the Cranberry Street Tunnel as a two-track line, the IND Eighth Avenue Line travels east on Cranberry Street, then south on Jay Street. It becomes the Fulton Street Line at an interlocking north of Jay Street–MetroTech while briefly running parallel with the IND Culver Line. It turns away from the Culver Line onto Schermerhorn Street to the six-track Hoyt–Schermerhorn Streets station, which it shares with the Brooklyn–Queens Crosstown Line. The local tracks are unused at Hoyt-Schermerhorn Streets, but connect to the abandoned Court Street station which is now the site of the New York City Transit Museum. At this point, the line becomes a four-track system until Euclid Avenue.

The line continues east under Schermerhorn Street to the intersections of Third Avenue and Flatbush Avenue, across them onto Lafayette Avenue and then finally onto Fulton Street until Broadway Junction.

After Broadway Junction, the line leaves Fulton Street via Truxton Street, crosses Broadway, curves through a corner of the East New York Yard, crosses Jamaica Avenue and then south on Pennsylvania Avenue. It then turns east onto Pitkin Avenue until Euclid Avenue station. East of Euclid Avenue, there are track connections to Pitkin Yard, and from either the express or local tracks to the two-track line towards Grant Avenue station. The four mainline trackways continue east on Pitkin Avenue, disused, and end at approximately Elderts Lane.

Past Grant Avenue, the line joins the former Fulton Street elevated via a ramp as it enters Queens, swinging somewhat north until it is over Liberty Avenue. Here, it becomes a three-track line, with the center track coming from Pitkin Yard. Just past Rockaway Boulevard, the IND Rockaway Line branches southward while the Fulton Street Line continues over Liberty Avenue to its terminus at Lefferts Boulevard.

== History ==
=== Early history ===
The Fulton Street subway was the city-owned Independent System (IND)'s main line from Downtown Brooklyn to southern Queens. Along with the IND Eighth Avenue Line, it was also alternately known as the Washington Heights−East New York Line. The subway was built to replace the elevated Fulton Street Elevated, which ran above Fulton Street from Boerum Place to Van Sinderen Avenue, south along Van Sinderen Avenue to Pitkin Avenue, down Pitkin Avenue to Euclid Avenue, and up Euclid Avenue, where it turned east on Liberty Avenue. As in Manhattan, the older elevated tracks were seen as depressing real estate values. The subway was designed to follow the elevated line as close as possible. It was routed along Schermerhorn Street due to the presence of the IRT subway already below Fulton Street in downtown Brooklyn and along Pennsylvania Avenue in East New York so that wider curves could be built, allowing faster speeds. The local tracks were always designed to terminate in downtown Brooklyn as local elevated trains would terminate at the Sands Street station. The groundbreaking for the line was held on April 16, 1929, at Fulton Street and Arlington Place, near the future Nostrand Avenue station.

The construction of the line required multiple high-voltage transmission lines to be rerouted under Atlantic Avenue. Due to the presence of many gas mains, telephone lines, sewers, fire alarm wires, and telegraph connections, digging of the subway line had to be done by hand shovels. In October 1930, the roof of the subway tunnel was completed to Vanderbilt Avenue, and the roadbed was ready for the installation of tracks. The New York City Board of Transportation required four months to pass following the replacement of dirt in excavations before permanent pavement could be installed to allow the soil to settle.

The line was opened from Jay Street to Rockaway Avenue on April 9, 1936, including the stub terminal at Court Street.

To allow the subway line to be built, the following streets were widened from 60 to 80 feet (18 to 24 m): Jay Street between Nassau Street to Fulton Street, Smith Street between Fulton Street and Atlantic Avenue, and Schermerhorn Street between Smith Street and Nevins Street. The land acquired to widen the streets was valued at $1.75 million.

=== Late 1930s and 1940s ===
Further construction was delayed by funding problems due to the Great Depression in the 1930s. This was temporarily solved by federal Works Progress Administration funding starting in 1936. The portion continuing from east of Rockaway Avenue along Pennsylvania and Pitkin Avenues to Crystal Street began construction in 1938. The next portion east from Crystal Street to around Grant Avenue, including the Euclid Avenue terminal and the Pitkin Yard, began construction in 1940. The progress lasted only a few years, as all work on the last portions in Brooklyn was stopped by December 1942 shortly after the United States entered World War II, with Broadway−East New York complete but not in operation due to lack of signal equipment, and the remaining stations to Euclid Avenue as unfinished shells.

The Court Street station was closed on June 1, 1946, due to low ridership and because of its close proximity to the Hoyt–Schermerhorn Streets station. After World War II ended, workers and materials became available for public use again. The badly needed extension to the more efficient terminal at Broadway−East New York (the current Broadway Junction station) opened on December 30, 1946.

The extension of the Fulton Street Line, the completion of which had been delayed due to war priorities, was finished by funds obtained by Mayor William O'Dwyer and was placed in operation on November 28, 1948, running along Pennsylvania Avenue and Pitkin Avenue to Euclid Avenue near the Queens border. Forty additional R10 cars were placed into service for the extension. The cost of the extension was about $46.5 million. It included the construction of the new Pitkin Avenue Storage Yard, which could accommodate 585 subway cars on 40 storage tracks. Because these stations were completed later than the rest of the line, they received different design features than other IND stations, including different wall tiles and fluorescent lighting.

The Fulton Street express tracks were not used in regular service until October 24, 1949. A trains began running express during rush hours to Broadway–East New York, with E trains extended to provide local service. The express reduced travel time by five minutes.

=== 1950s to 1990s ===
In 1953, the platforms were lengthened at Ralph Avenue and Broadway–East New York to 660 feet (200 m) to allow E trains to run eleven car trains. The E began running eleven car trains during rush hours on September 8, 1953. The extra train car increased the total carrying capacity by 4,000 passengers. The lengthening project cost $400,000.

In late 1952, the Board of Transportation began construction on a connection between the IND and both the Fulton El and the Rockaway Beach Branch of the Long Island Rail Road, which included a new underground station at Grant Avenue. The connection from the 80th Street elevated station to the rest of the BMT Fulton Elevated was severed on April 26, 1956, and the IND was extended east (track direction south) from Euclid Avenue via the intermediate station at Grant Avenue, and a connecting ramp (known as the Grant Avenue ramp). The new service to Lefferts Boulevard began three days later. On June 28, 1956, the connection to the IND Rockaway Line east of Rockaway Boulevard was opened.

=== 2000s to present ===
The 2015–2019 Metropolitan Transportation Authority (MTA) Capital Plan called for the Fulton Street Line's Clinton–Washington Avenues, Kingston–Throop Avenues, and Van Siclen Avenue stations, along with 30 others, to undergo a complete overhaul as part of the Enhanced Station Initiative. Updates would include cellular service, Wi-Fi, USB charging stations, interactive service advisories and maps, improved signage, and improved station lighting. However, in April 2018, it was announced that cost overruns had forced the MTA to reduce the number of subway stations included in the program from 33 stations to 20. The stations to be renovated along the IND Fulton Street Line were among the 13 stations without funding, which will be pushed back to the 2020–2024 Capital Plan.

As part of a program to upgrade the signaling of the New York City Subway, the MTA's 2020–2024 Capital Program calls for adding communications-based train control (CBTC) to several more lines, including the IND Fulton Street Line west of the Euclid Avenue station. The CBTC signaling system would replace the line's existing signal system, which has not been upgraded since the line originally opened in the 1930s and 1940s. On November 9, 2022, the MTA put out the request for proposals for the design-build contract to install CBTC on the Fulton Street Line between High Street and Euclid Avenue. CBTC installation on the rest of the Fulton Street Line from Euclid Avenue to Ozone Park–Lefferts Boulevard was proposed as part of the MTA's 2025–2029 Capital Program. In December 2025, L.K. Comstock received a $1.3 billion contract to install CBTC on both sections of the Fulton Street Line; the installation was to be funded using revenue from congestion pricing in New York City. CBTC work began in late 2026.

== Second System planned route ==
Early in the planning of the subway, the city considered recapturing parts of the BMT Jamaica Line, which had been built under the Dual Contracts. This would have created two branches of the Fulton Street Subway east of Broadway Junction. Bellmouths were built into the outer walls of the subway tunnel just east of the Broadway Junction station for a future connection.

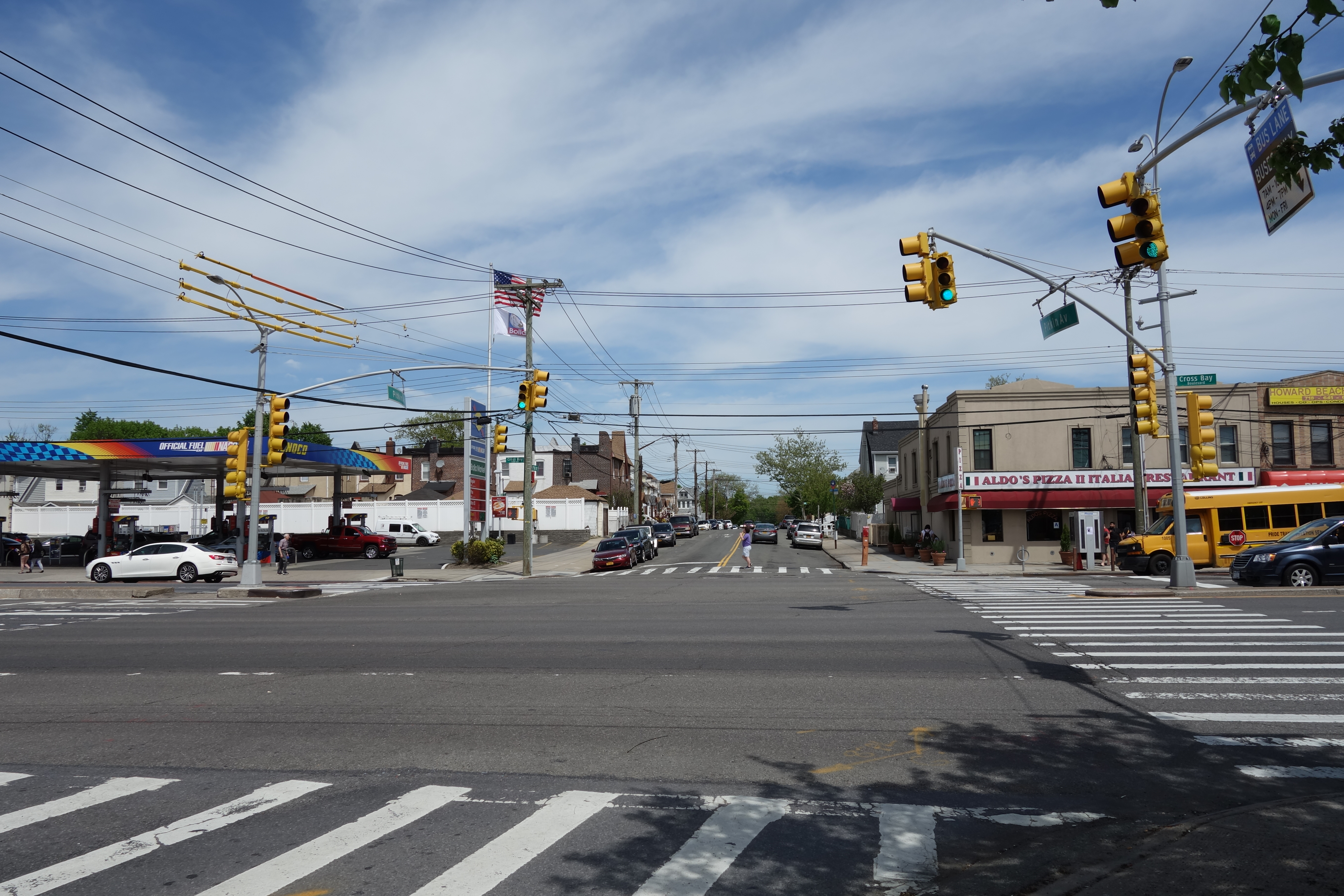
The extension of the IND Fulton Street Line would have included a station at Cross Bay Boulevard in Ozone Park.

The IND Fulton Street Line was supposed to be extended farther east into Queens as part of the IND Second System, via an extension of the Fulton Elevated or a new subway. The line would have gone as far as Springfield Boulevard in Queens Village or 229th Street in Cambria Heights, both near the Nassau County border. The line would have also had a spur to the Rockaways.

The 1929 Second System plan suggested recapturing and extending the Fulton elevated along Liberty, Brinkerhoff and Hollis Avenues to Springfield Boulevard, near Hempstead Turnpike, Belmont Park, and the Queens Village LIRR Station. The 1939 plan, meanwhile, proposed extending the subway along Pitkin Avenue to Cross Bay Boulevard in South Ozone Park, then along Linden Boulevard to Cambria Heights near the Cross Island Parkway. A spur would have branched off east of Cross Bay Boulevard, turning south to join with the former Rockaway Beach Branch of the Long Island Rail Road (now the IND Rockaway Line). This extended Fulton Street Line would have also facilitated service from the planned Second Avenue Subway via a river tunnel from Lower Manhattan to the then-terminal station at Court Street.

In a 1940 plan, which was revised in 1945, the IND Fulton Street Line would connect to the IND Rockaway Line in a similar manner to the 1939 plan, via an extension of the subway under Pitkin Avenue. The line, east of Euclid Avenue, would be 4 tracks, with local stations at 76th Street and 84th Street, and an express station at Cross Bay Boulevard. At Cross Bay Boulevard, a flying junction would let the local tracks cross over to the inside and the express tracks cross over to the outside. The layout would be similar to that of Manhattan's 168th Street station. East of Cross Bay Boulevard, another flying junction would bring a two-track branch over the line to a pair of portals north of Aqueduct–North Conduit Avenue station. Meanwhile, the Fulton Street Line's four tracks would merge into two tracks, and end at 105th Street (today's Aqueduct Racetrack), where a scissors crossover would be present just west of the station. Crossovers would also be located between the local and express pair of tracks east of 76th Street, and between the two express tracks east of Cross Bay Boulevard.

Currently the line ends at Lefferts Boulevard in Ozone Park (the former end of the Fulton El), and only the Rockaway extension was completed. The mainline tracks that go past the Euclid Avenue station were to be part of a 4-track line to Cambria Heights.

== Station listing ==
Station service legend
Stops all times	Stops 24 hours a day
Stops all times except late nights	Stops every day during daytime hours only
Stops late nights only	Stops every day during overnight hours only
Stops rush hours in the peak direction only	Stops during weekday rush hours in the peak direction only
Time period details
Disabled access	Station is compliant with the Americans with Disabilities Act
↑	Station is compliant with the Americans with Disabilities Act in the indicated direction only
↓	Station is compliant with the Americans with Disabilities Act in the indicated direction only
	Elevator access to mezzanine only

Neighborhood (approximate)	Disabled access	Station	Tracks	Services	Opened	Transfers and notes
Brooklyn
Begins as a continuation of the IND Eighth Avenue Line express tracks (A C ); with connecting tracks to the IND Sixth Avenue Line local tracks (no regular service)
Downtown Brooklyn	Disabled access	Jay Street–MetroTech	express	A C	February 1, 1933	IND Culver Line (F <F>); BMT Fourth Avenue Line (N R W )
Downtown Brooklyn	Local tracks begin					
Downtown Brooklyn	Disabled access	Court Street	local		April 9, 1936	Closed 1946, reopened 1976 as the New York Transit Museum
Downtown Brooklyn	Local tracks continue east from Court Street; Express tracks continue south then east from Jay Street–MetroTech					
Downtown Brooklyn	Elevator access to mezzanine only	Hoyt–Schermerhorn Streets	all	A C	April 9, 1936	IND Crosstown Line (G ) Local tracks, and platforms between local and express tracks, unused
Fort Greene		Lafayette Avenue	local	A C	April 9, 1936	
Clinton Hill		Clinton–Washington Avenues	local	A C	April 9, 1936	
Bedford–Stuyvesant	Disabled access	Franklin Avenue	local	A C	April 9, 1936	BMT Franklin Avenue Line (S )
Bedford–Stuyvesant		Nostrand Avenue	all	A C	April 9, 1936	local tracks on lower level, express tracks on upper level B44 Select Bus Service
Bedford–Stuyvesant		Kingston–Throop Avenues	local	A C	April 9, 1936	
Bedford–Stuyvesant	Disabled access	Utica Avenue	all	A C	April 9, 1936	B46 Select Bus Service
Bedford–Stuyvesant		Ralph Avenue	local	A C	April 9, 1936	
Bedford–Stuyvesant		Rockaway Avenue	local	A C	April 9, 1936	
East New York		Broadway Junction	all	A C	December 30, 1946	BMT Canarsie Line (L ) BMT Jamaica Line (J Z ) originally Broadway-East New York
East New York		Liberty Avenue	local	A C	November 28, 1948	
East New York		Van Siclen Avenue	local	A C	November 28, 1948	
East New York		Shepherd Avenue	local	A C	November 28, 1948	
East New York	Disabled access	Euclid Avenue	all	A C	November 28, 1948	
Connecting tracks to Pitkin Yard and Grant Avenue spurs; mainline tracks dead-end
City Line		Grant Avenue	all	A	April 29, 1956	
Queens
Single express track begins from Pitkin Yard (no regular service)
Ozone Park		80th Street	local	A	September 25, 1915	
Ozone Park		88th Street	local	A	September 25, 1915	
Ozone Park	Disabled access	Rockaway Boulevard	local	A	September 25, 1915	Q52/Q53 Select Bus Service
Ozone Park	IND Rockaway Line splits (A )					
Ozone Park		104th Street	local	A	September 25, 1915	
Richmond Hill		111th Street	local	A	September 25, 1915	
Richmond Hill	Disabled access	Ozone Park–Lefferts Boulevard	all	A	September 25, 1915	Q10 and Q80 buses to JFK Airport
