= Ozone Park–Lefferts Boulevard station =

New York City Subway station in Queens

Ozone Park–Lefferts Blvd
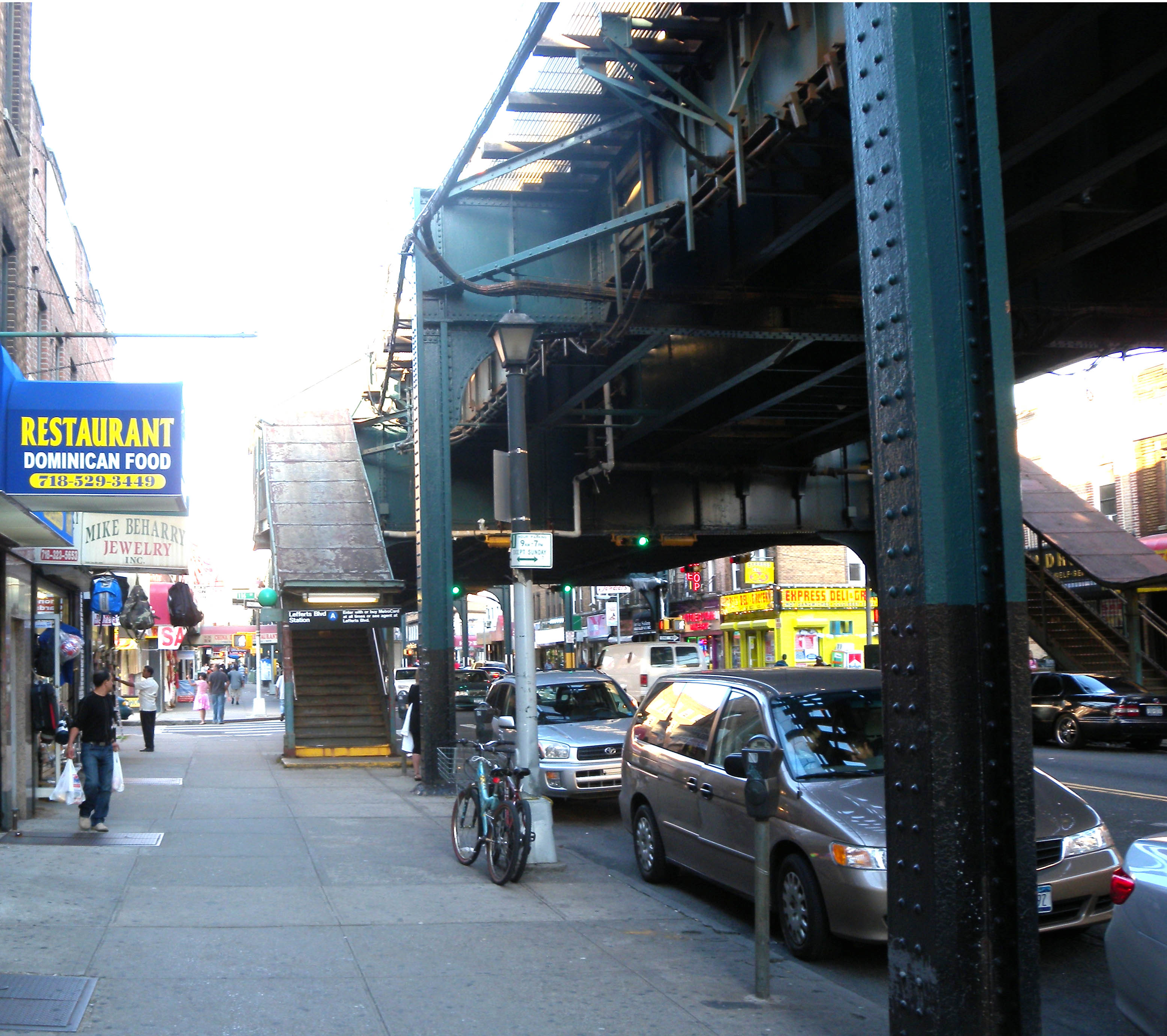
- Northwestern street stair

Station statistics
- Address: Lefferts Boulevard and Liberty Avenue; Queens, New York
- Borough: Queens
- Locale: South Ozone Park; South Richmond Hill
- Coordinates: 40.686203°N 73.82422°W
- Division: B (IND, formerly BMT)
- Line: IND Fulton Street Line; BMT Fulton Street Line (formerly)
- Services: A (all times)
- Transit: MTA Bus: Q10, Q80, Q112, QM18
- Structure: Elevated
- Platforms: 1 island platform
- Tracks: 2

Other information
- Opened: September 25, 1915; 110 years ago
- Accessible: ADA-accessible
- Former/other names: Lefferts Avenue; Lefferts Avenue–119th Street

Traffic
- 2024: 1,286,722 ▲5.3%
- Rank: 245 out of 423
Services
Preceding station	New York City Subway	Following station
111th Street toward Inwood–207th Street	Local	Terminus
Non-revenue services and lines
Preceding station	New York City Subway	Following station
Rockaway Boulevard express	no service	
Location

Track layout
Street map
Station service legend
Symbol	Description
Stops all times	Stops all times

The Ozone Park–Lefferts Boulevard station is an elevated terminal station on the IND Fulton Street Line of the New York City Subway, located at the intersection of Lefferts Boulevard and Liberty Avenue in Queens. It serves as the terminus of the A route's Lefferts Boulevard branch. Despite its name, the station is not actually located in Ozone Park, but rather in the adjacent neighborhood of South Ozone Park, with part of the station also in South Richmond Hill.

== History ==
Lefferts Boulevard was one of the six stations along Liberty Avenue in Queens, from 80th Street through Lefferts Boulevard, as well as the current three track elevated structure, built for the BMT Fulton Street Line in 1915 as part of BMT's portion of the Dual Contracts. The connection to the BMT was severed on April 26, 1956, and the IND was extended east (railroad south) from Euclid Avenue via a connecting tunnel and new intermediate station at Grant Avenue, with the new service beginning on April 29, 1956.

The station has gone by a number of different names. It opened as Lefferts Avenue. A 1924 system map portrayed the station as "Lefferts Avenue", with "119th St." shown below the name in parentheses, and in a smaller print. By 1948, "Lefferts" and "119" were shown in equal sizes, and by 1959 the name was shown as "119 St–Lefferts". Lefferts Avenue was later renamed Lefferts Boulevard, and the station appears as "Ozone Park–Lefferts Boulevard" on the current official map.

In 2014, the Metropolitan Transportation Authority started a renovation project at the Lefferts Boulevard station. The renovation including repairing stairs, doors, floors, windows, canopies and painting the station, and added 2 ADA-accessible elevators (1 outside fare control from street level to mezzanine, and 1 more inside fare control from mezzanine to platform level) at the intersection of Liberty Avenue and Lefferts Boulevard. This project was initially scheduled to be completed in April 2016, but delays occurred due to unforeseen field conditions requiring additional work, and the completion date was pushed back multiple times. The elevators ultimately opened in January 2018. The project cost $29 million; $8 million for the station renovation and $21 million for the elevators.

In early 2024, the MTA installed a "Welcome to Little Guyana" sign at the station.

== Station layout ==
Platform level	Westbound	← toward Inwood–207th Street (111th Street) ← late night shuttle toward Euclid Avenue (111th Street) (No express service: Rockaway Boulevard)
Platform level	Island platform
Platform level	Westbound	← toward Inwood–207th Street (111th Street) ← late night shuttle toward Euclid Avenue (111th Street) (No express service: Rockaway Boulevard)
Mezzanine		Fare control, station agent, OMNY machines Elevator at northwest corner of Lefferts Boulevard and Liberty Avenue
Ground	Street level	Exit/entrance

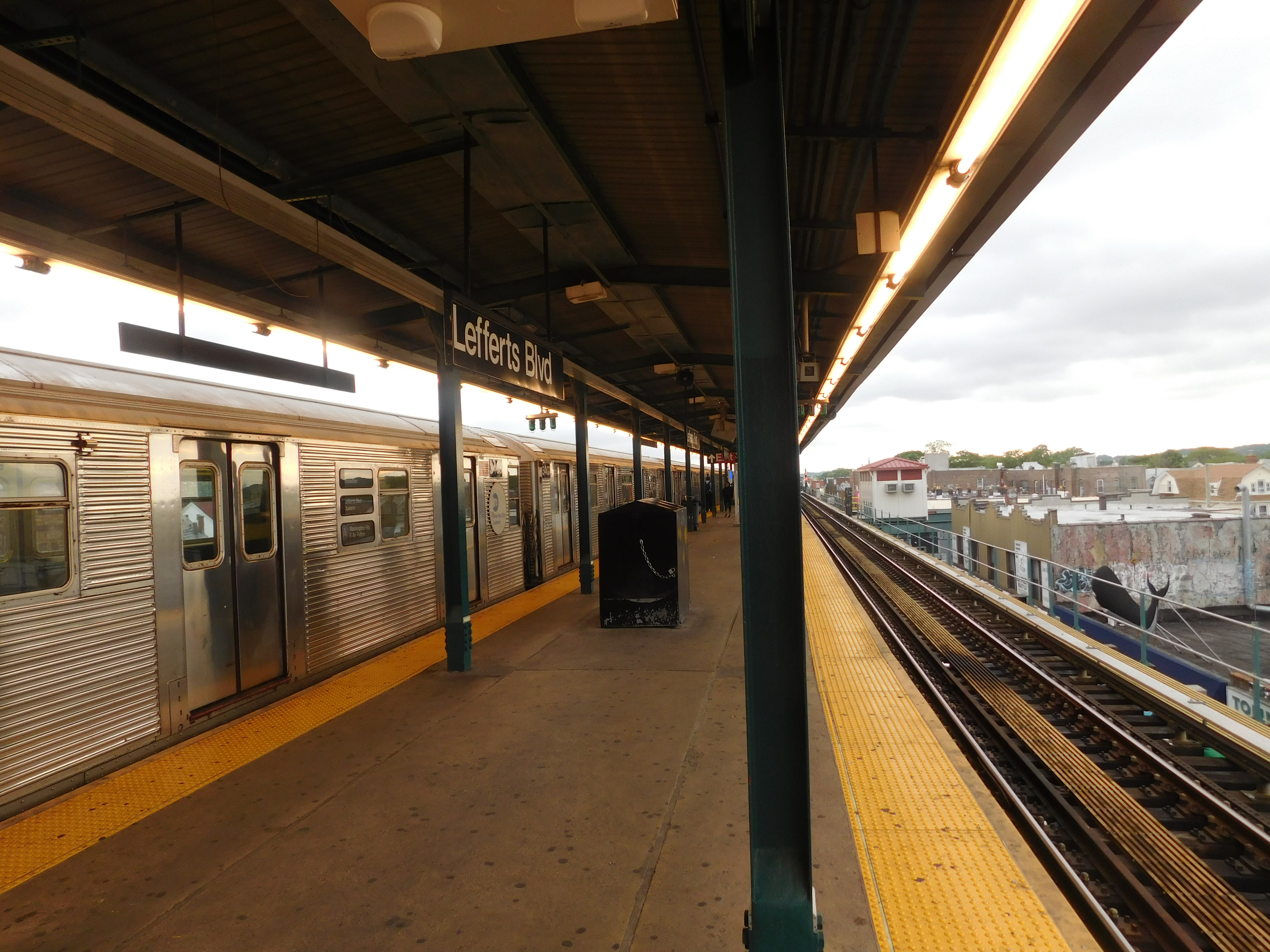
Platform

This station is one of the three southern terminals for the A train. Although this is a "south" terminal in railroad directions (considering the Eighth Avenue Line in Manhattan as north–south), Liberty Avenue underneath runs geographically west-southwest to east-northeast, so a train approaching the "south" is actually traveling east-northeast, or more north than south. The A train stops here at all times except nights, running to Brooklyn and Manhattan; a shuttle train to Euclid Avenue serves the station during late nights. The station is the eastern terminus for all service; the next stop to the west (railroad south) is 111th Street.

This station has one island platform and two tracks. The tracks at the geographic north end of the station end at bumper blocks. At the geographic south end of the station, the line splits from two tracks to three. The middle express track is not currently used in revenue service.

=== Exits ===
The full-time entrance is at the geographic east end of the station. Three doors lead to a staircase, which descends to an enclosed station house. Past the bumper blocks, an elevator also provides access to that station house. Outside fare control, staircases descend to either western corner of Liberty Avenue and Lefferts Boulevard, while another elevator descends to the northwestern corner of the intersection.

The exits at the opposite end have HEET access, with a mezzanine that leads to either western corner of Liberty Avenue and 116th Street, with various offices and transit employee facilities. This mezzanine was renovated by an in-house contract in 1999. The tile colors here are light beige with dark green accents, installed in 1997.
