= Grant Avenue station (IND Fulton Street Line) =

New York City Subway station in Brooklyn

Grant Avenue
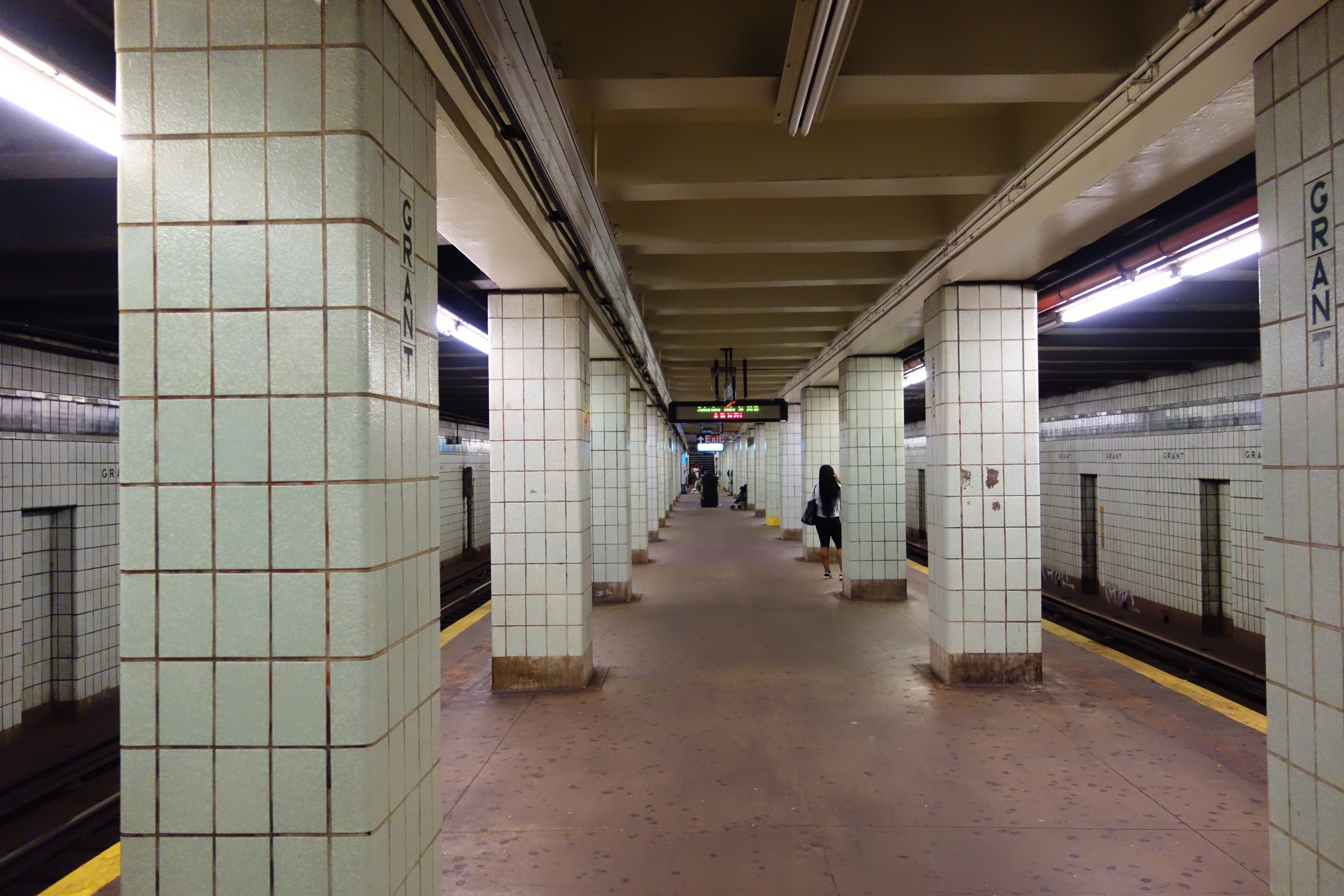
- Grant Avenue station in 2018

Station statistics
- Address: Grant Avenue and Pitkin Avenue; Brooklyn, New York
- Borough: Brooklyn
- Locale: City Line; Cypress Hills
- Coordinates: 40.676635°N 73.86559°W
- Division: B (IND)
- Line: IND Fulton Street Line
- Services: A (all times)
- Transit: MTA Bus: Q8, Q112
- Structure: Underground
- Platforms: 1 island platform
- Tracks: 2

Other information
- Opened: April 29, 1956; 70 years ago

Traffic
- 2025: 1,136,716 ▲2%
- Rank: 288 out of 423
Services
Preceding station	New York City Subway	Following station
Euclid Avenue toward Inwood–207th Street	Local	80th Street toward Far Rockaway–Mott Avenue or Ozone Park–Lefferts Boulevard
Location
Location within New York City Subway
Location within New York City
Location within New York
Track layout
Street map
Station service legend
Symbol	Description
Stops all times	Stops all times

The Grant Avenue station is a station on the IND Fulton Street Line of the New York City Subway. Located at Grant Avenue just north of Pitkin Avenue in Cypress Hills and City Line, Brooklyn, near the border between the boroughs of Brooklyn and Queens, it is served by the A train at all times. The station is the line's easternmost stop in Brooklyn; the Fulton Street Line continues east into Queens via the Fulton Street Elevated.

The funds to construct the Fulton Street Line east of Broadway Junction, including the Grant Avenue station, were allocated in 1939. Construction of the extension was delayed due to material shortages from World War II. The Fulton Street Line between Broadway Junction and Euclid Avenue opened in 1948. Funding to construct the Grant Avenue station was allocated in 1950, and the station opened in 1956.

== History ==
=== Original plan ===
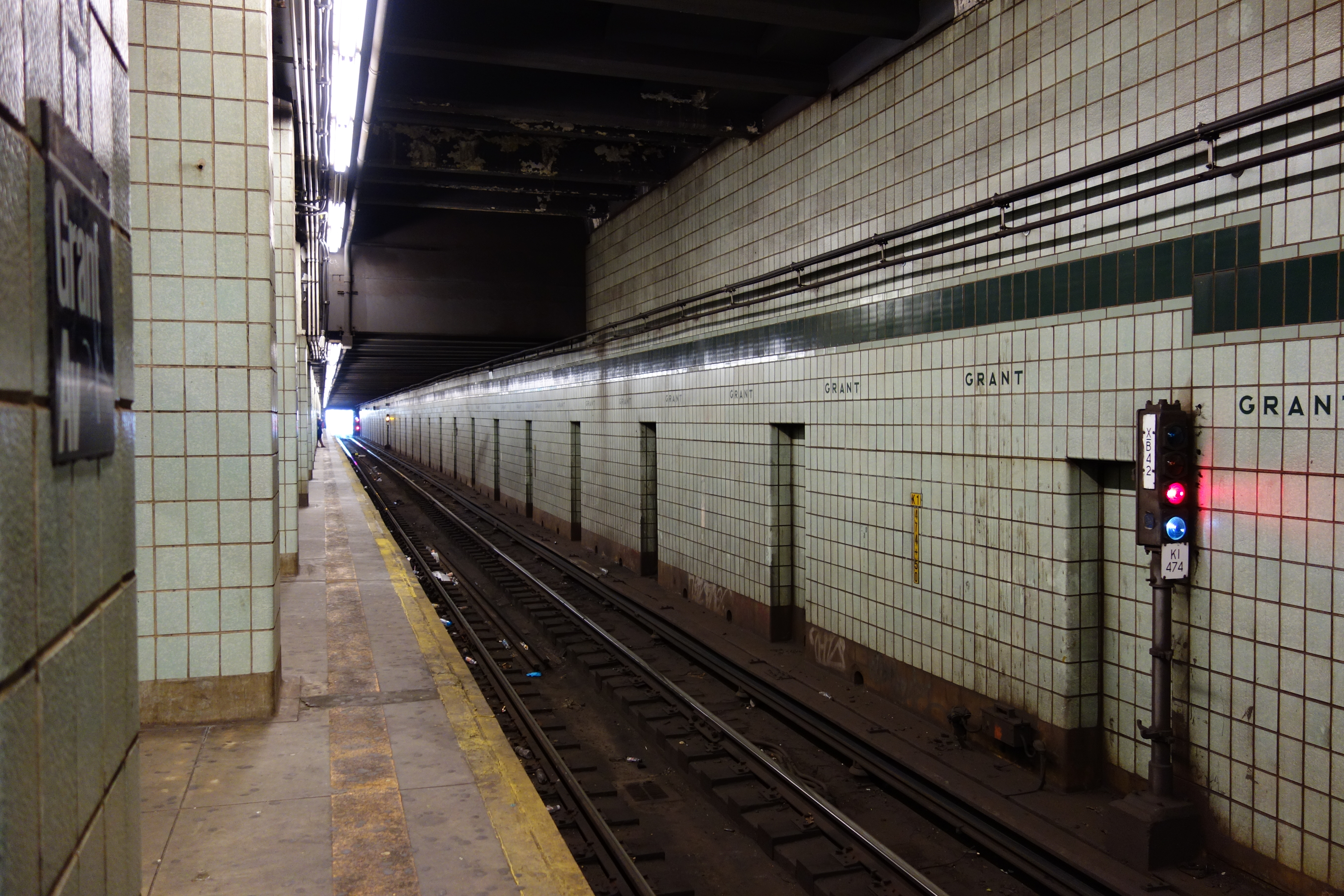
Southbound track

Grant Avenue was built as part of the extension of the IND Fulton Street Line east of Broadway–East New York. Funding for the station was allocated in the New York City Board of Transportation's 1939 Capital Budget, projected to be completed by 1942. In October 1940, construction began on the portion of the extension along Pitkin Avenue between Crystal Street and Grant Avenue. This included a station at Euclid Avenue and the Pitkin Yard, but did not include a station at Grant Avenue. By this time, the Board acquired private property on the east side of Grant Avenue for subway construction. By 1941, the intersection of Pitkin and Grant Avenues was excavated for subway construction. The opening of the East New York station, and completion of all stations east to Euclid Avenue that were then-under construction, was halted in 1942 due to supply shortages from World War II.

The extension of the line to Euclid Avenue opened in November 1948, six years late. As part of the extension, the Fulton Line tunnel under Pitkin Avenue was built up to Eldert Lane just past Grant Avenue to facilitate a future subway extension via Pitkin Avenue.

=== Modified plans ===
By 1947, the plans were modified so the IND line would instead use the nearby BMT Fulton Street Elevated along Liberty Avenue. Additional trackways were installed in the tunnel just east of Euclid Avenue for a potential connection to the Fulton Street El. The yet-to-be-built Grant Avenue station was also displayed on the signal board in the Euclid Avenue station. In 1949, the Board of Transportation approved a plan to extend the IND Fulton Line along the eastern Fulton El to Lefferts Boulevard. The station was expected to be completed in 1952. Under the original plans, the Grant Avenue station of the BMT elevated would have been preserved as the first station east of the link. In 1950, the New York City Planning Commission approved funding for an extension of the IND Fulton Line east from Euclid Avenue to Grant Avenue.

In late 1952, the Board of Transportation began construction on a connection between the IND and both the Fulton Elevated and the Rockaway Beach Branch of the Long Island Rail Road, which included a new underground Grant Avenue station. The station opened on April 29, 1956, along with the connection to the Fulton Elevated east to Lefferts Boulevard. One month later, service to the Rockaways commenced via the old Rockaway Beach Branch, which had been converted to the IND Rockaway Line. The station also replaced the former Grant Avenue station on the Fulton Elevated, which was closed and demolished.

== Station layout ==
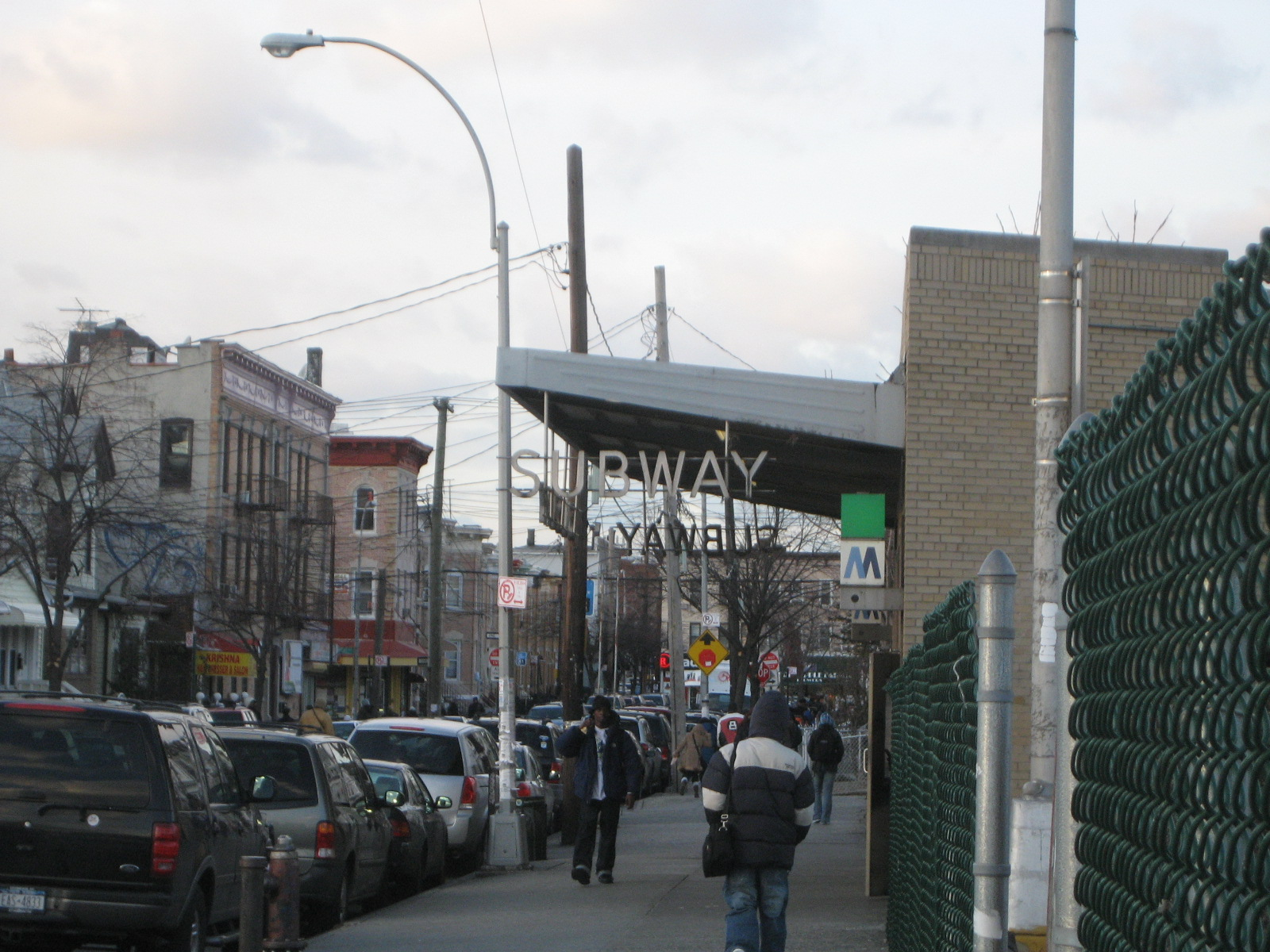
Street view of the only entrance to Grant Avenue station

This station has two tracks and one island platform. The A train stops here at all times; a shuttle train from Euclid Avenue to Ozone Park–Lefferts Boulevard also serves the station during late nights. The station is between 80th Street in Queens to the east (railroad south) and Euclid Avenue to the west (railroad north).

The column and wall tiles are textured light green, with "GRANT" in dark green letters going down vertically on columns and horizontally along the wall underneath the tile band; the tile band is set in a soldier course of dark green bordered by the same light green as the rest of the wall, albeit minus the textured surface. When it opened, the Grant Avenue station featured fluorescent lighting, instead of the incandescent lights that were standard throughout the New York City Subway at the time.

East of the station (or south, in terms of railroad directions), the line gains a center track from Pitkin Yard, leaves the subway tunnel and ramps up to the elevated tracks along Liberty Avenue. Once it exits the tunnel, the line enters Queens. At the tunnel portal, another track from Pitkin Yard merges with the southbound outer track. The line continues as three tracks, towards 80th Street station on Liberty Avenue. The two yard tracks are located under the station.

=== Exit ===
The station's only entrance is a 1950s-style brick station-house at street level, located on the east side of Grant Avenue north of Pitkin Avenue. Inside, there is a token booth, turnstile bank, fluorescent lights, newsstand, and three staircases to the platform. The entrance is located next to a NYCDOT park and ride facility, signed as "Municipal Parking: Grant Avenue," that encompasses both sides of Grant Avenue. Additional parking was formerly present on then-NYCT property across North Conduit Avenue, which has since been developed.
