= List of New York City Subway lines =

In the NYC Subway, a "line" is the physical track infrastructure (often named after streets), while a "service" is the specific route (letter for former IND/BMT services or number for former IRT services) that runs on those tracks. This diagram clarifies the distinction between a "line" and a "service" by displaying only the lines of the NYC Subway ("Sea Beach," "8 Av," "QBL," etc.).

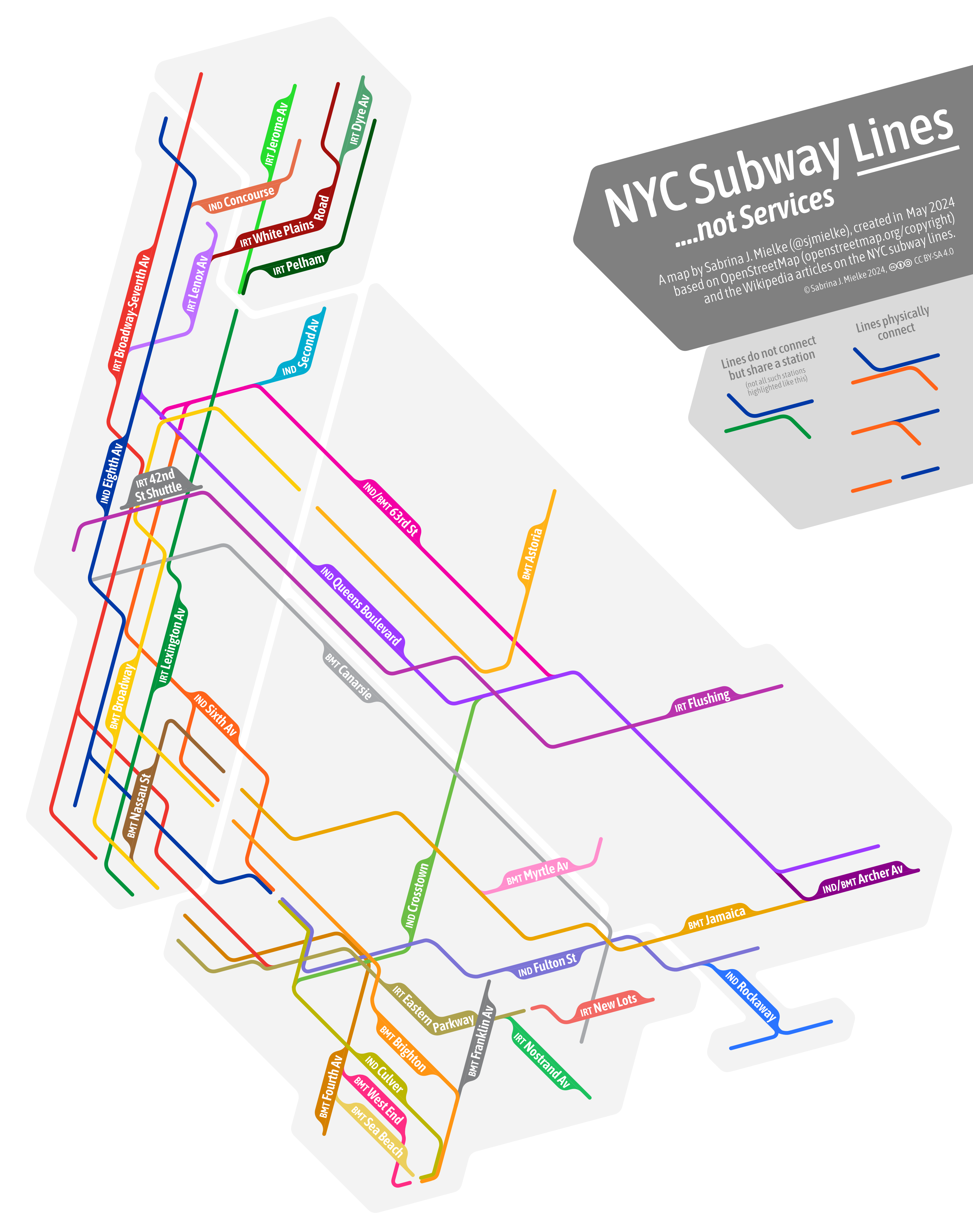
A schematic map of New York City's subway lines (i.e., Sea Beach, West End, ...) as opposed to services (i.e., N, D, ...).

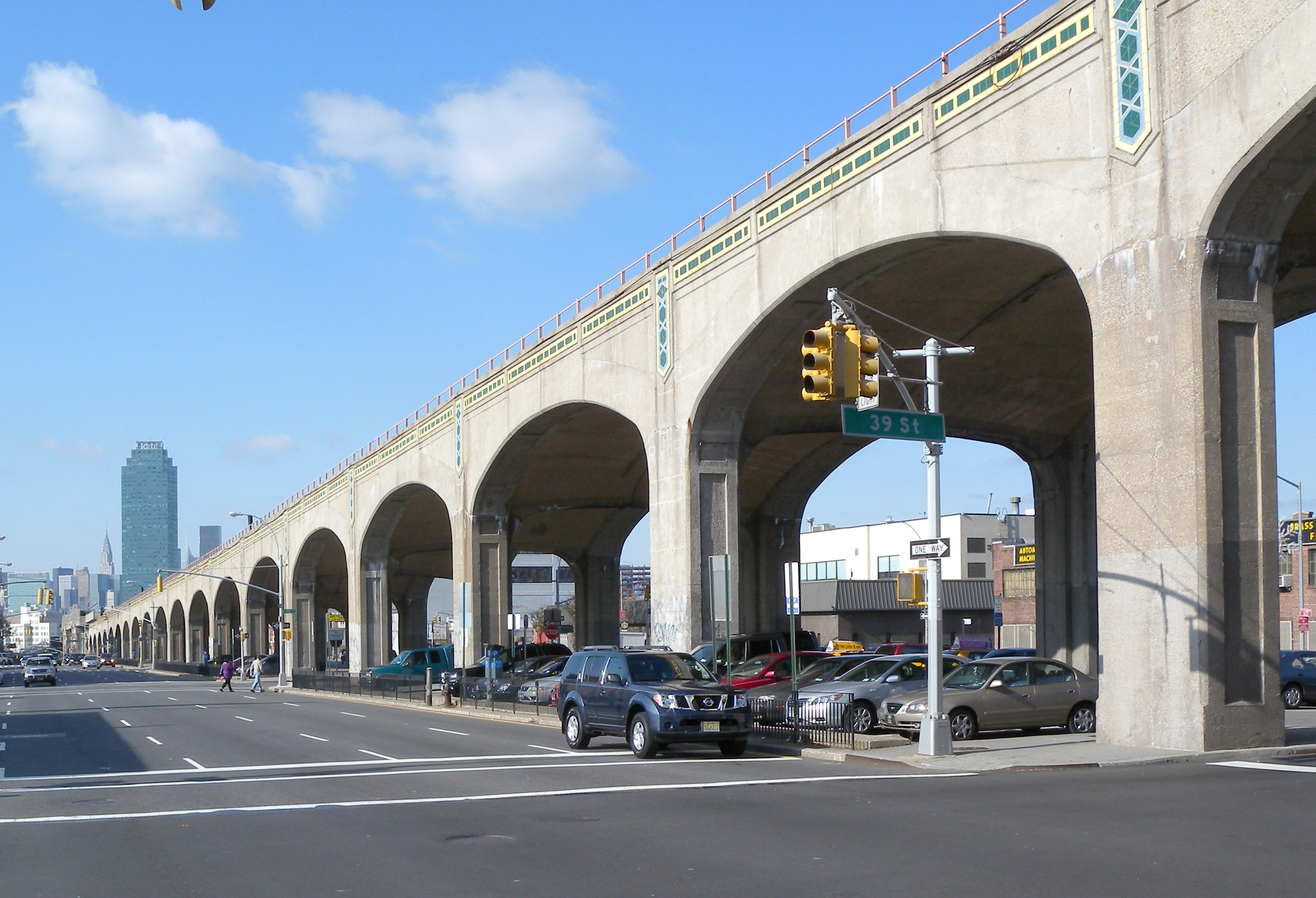
The Queens Boulevard viaduct of the IRT Flushing Line

The New York City Subway is a heavy-rail public transit system serving four of the five boroughs of New York City. The present New York City Subway system inherited the systems of the Interborough Rapid Transit Company (IRT), Brooklyn–Manhattan Transit Corporation (BMT), and the Independent Subway System (IND). New York City has owned the IND since its inception; the BMT and IRT were taken over by the city in 1940. The former IRT system is now known as the A Division, while the B Division is the combined former BMT and IND systems.

In the New York City Subway nomenclature, a "line" refers to the physical trackage that is used by numbered or lettered "services", which change periodically. Today, the division or company names are not used publicly, while the line names may occasionally be used.

== Nomenclature ==
In the nomenclature of the subway, the terms "line" and "service" are not interchangeable with each other. While in popular usage the word "line" is often used synonymously with "service" (even sometimes on the website of the MTA), this list will use the formal usage of the term "line."

A line is the physical structure and tracks that trains run over. Each section of the system is assigned a unique line name that begins with a division (IRT, BMT or IND), which is its pre-unification division when applicable. For example, the line under Eighth Avenue is the IND Eighth Avenue Line. Some lines have changed names (and even divisions), but this happens relatively infrequently.

By contrast, a service refers to the route that a train takes across the various lines. A service can operate along several lines and even along different divisions. For example, the R service operates along the IND Queens Boulevard Line as well as the BMT Broadway Line and the BMT Fourth Avenue Line.

Each service is assigned a color. Since 1979, each service's color corresponds to the line it primarily uses in Midtown Manhattan—defined as the trunk line. There are three exceptions: the IND Crosstown Line, which does not carry services to Manhattan, is colored light green; the BMT Nassau Street Line, which runs only through Lower Manhattan, is colored brown; and all shuttles are colored dark gray. The list of trunk lines and colors is shown in the table below.

Primary Trunk line	Color	Pantone	Hexadecimal	Service bullets
IND Eighth Avenue Line	Blue	PMS 286	#0039a6	"A" train "C" train "E" train
IND Sixth Avenue Line	Orange	PMS 165	#ff6319	"B" train "D" train "F" train "F" express train "M" train
IND Crosstown Line	Lime	PMS 376	#6cbe45	"G" train
BMT Canarsie Line	Light slate gray	50% black	#a7a9ac	"L" train
BMT Nassau Street Line	Brown	PMS 154	#996633	"J" train "Z" train
BMT Broadway Line	Yellow	PMS 116	#fccc0a	"N" train "Q" train "R" train "W" train
IRT Broadway–Seventh Avenue Line	Red	PMS 185	#ee352e	"1" train "2" train "3" train
IRT Lexington Avenue Line	Green	PMS 355	#00933c	"4" train "5" train "6" train "6" express train
IRT Flushing Line	Purple	PMS Purple	#b933ad	"7" train "7" express train
IND Second Avenue Line	Turquoise	PMS 638	#00add0	"T" train
Shuttles	Dark slate gray	70% black	#808183	shuttle train

== Line listing ==
There are currently 36 rail lines. The Archer Avenue Lines and the 63rd Street Lines are each classified as two separate lines due to their structure: both lines have distinct sections that are chained as BMT and the IND lines.

In the list below, lines with colors next to them indicate trunk lines, which determine the colors that are used for services' route bullets and diamonds, as well as shuttle service lines. The opening date refers to the opening of the first section of track for the line. In the "division" column, the current division is followed by the original division in parentheses.

Division	Line	Borough(s)	Service(s)	Opened	Structure
B (IND)	Second Avenue Line	Manhattan	N Q R	January 1, 2017	underground
B (BMT)	Fourth Avenue Line	Brooklyn	D N R W	June 22, 1915	underground
B (IND)	Sixth Avenue Line	Manhattan; Brooklyn	B D F <F> M	January 1936	underground
B (IND)	Eighth Avenue Line	Manhattan; Brooklyn	A B C D E	September 10, 1932	underground
A (IRT)	42nd Street Shuttle	Manhattan	S	October 27, 1904	underground (Note: The route of the original IRT line, the first underground New York City rapid transit line, began at City Hall in the south, followed the IRT Lexington Avenue Line to 33rd Street, turned west on 42nd Street to Grand Central, followed the IRT 42nd Street Shuttle to Times Square, turned north on Broadway to 50th Street, followed the IRT Broadway–Seventh Avenue Line and terminated at 145th Street.)
B (BMT)	63rd Street Line	Manhattan	N Q R	October 29, 1989	underground
B (IND)	63rd Street Line	Manhattan; Queens	F M	October 29, 1989	underground
B (BMT)	Archer Avenue Line	Queens	J Z	December 11, 1988	underground
B (IND)	Archer Avenue Line	Queens	E	December 11, 1988	underground
B (BMT)	Astoria Line	Queens	N W	April 21, 1917	elevated
B (BMT)	Brighton Line	Brooklyn	B Q	July 2, 1878	underground, open cut, at-grade, embankment, elevated
B (BMT)	Broadway Line	Manhattan	N Q R W	September 4, 1917	underground
A (IRT)	Broadway–Seventh Avenue Line	Bronx; Manhattan; Brooklyn	1; 2; 3	October 27, 1904	elevated, embankment, underground
B (BMT)	Canarsie Line	Brooklyn; Manhattan	L	October 21, 1865	underground, elevated, at-grade
B (IND)	Concourse Line	Bronx; Manhattan	B D	July 1, 1933	underground
B (IND)	Crosstown Line	Brooklyn; Queens	G	August 19, 1933	underground
B (IND)	Culver Line	Brooklyn	F <F> G	March 16, 1919	underground, elevated (Note: The formation of the IND Culver Line occurred when the IND "recaptured" (e.g. New York City took over lines it had built for private companies) the trackage rights of the BMT Culver Line in 1954, connecting Ditmas Avenue to Church Avenue, the terminus of the IND Brooklyn Line.)
A (IRT)	Dyre Avenue Line	Bronx	5	May 15, 1941	elevated (Note: The IRT Dyre Avenue Line was formed from the purchase of abandoned New York, Westchester and Boston Railway trackage in 1941.), embankment, open-cut, underground
A (IRT)	Eastern Parkway Line	Brooklyn	2; 3; 4; 5	January 9, 1908	underground
A (IRT)	Flushing Line	Queens; Manhattan	7 <7>	June 22, 1915	underground, elevated
B (BMT)	Franklin Avenue Line	Brooklyn	S	July 2, 1878	elevated, embankment, open cut
B (IND)	Fulton Street Line	Brooklyn; Queens	A C	April 9, 1936	underground, elevated (Note: For the extension of the IND Fulton Street Line in 1956, the IND "recaptured" the trackage rights of the BMT Fulton Street Line, connecting Hudson Street–80th Street to Grant Avenue.)
B (BMT)	Jamaica Line	Brooklyn; Queens	J M Z	February 2, 1885	elevated
A (IRT)	Jerome Avenue Line	Bronx	4; 5	June 12, 1917	elevated, underground
A (IRT)	Lenox Avenue Line	Manhattan	2; 3	November 23, 1904	at-grade, underground
A (IRT)	Lexington Avenue Line	Manhattan	4; 5; 6 <6>	October 27, 1904	underground
B (BMT)	Myrtle Avenue Line	Brooklyn; Queens	M	December 19, 1889	elevated, embankment, at-grade
B (BMT)	Nassau Street Line	Manhattan	J M Z	September 16, 1908	underground
A (IRT)	New Lots Line	Brooklyn	2; 3; 4; 5	November 23, 1920	elevated
A (IRT)	Nostrand Avenue Line	Brooklyn	2; 5	August 23, 1920	underground
A (IRT)	Pelham Line	Bronx	6 <6>	August 1, 1918	underground, elevated
B (IND)	Queens Boulevard Line	Queens; Manhattan	E F <F> M R	August 19, 1933	underground
B (IND)	Rockaway Line	Queens	A S	June 28, 1956	at-grade, embankment, elevated (Note: The IND Rockaway Line was formed from the purchase of some trackage from the Long Island Rail Road's Rockaway Park Branch and Far Rockaway Branch in 1955.)
B (BMT)	Sea Beach Line	Brooklyn	N W	June 22, 1915	open cut, elevated
B (BMT)	West End Line	Brooklyn	D R W	June 24, 1916	open-cut, elevated
A (IRT)	White Plains Road Line	Bronx	2; 5	July 10, 1905	elevated, underground

== Inter-division connections ==
The following list shows the connections between the different divisions of the New York City Subway.

=== Purpose-built ===
These connections can be used by trains in revenue service:

- 60th Street Tunnel Connection, also known as the 11th Street Cut (Queens) (BMT/IND) (R train)
- 63rd Street Lines (Manhattan) (BMT/IND)
- Coney Island–Stillwell Avenue station (BMT/IND) (originally all BMT) (D, F, <F>, N, and Q trains)
- Chrystie Street Connection (Manhattan) (BMT/IND) via the Manhattan Bridge (B and D trains) and via the Williamsburg Bridge (M train)

This connection is not for revenue service due to the differing widths of the trains:

- Astoria Line / Flushing Line (Queens) (BMT/IRT)

=== Yards ===
These connections are located within the subway's rail yards and are not intended for revenue service.

- 207th Street Yard (Manhattan) (IND/IRT); trains from the IND Eighth Avenue Line and IRT Broadway–Seventh Avenue Line
- Coney Island Complex (Brooklyn) (BMT/IND); trains from the IND Culver Line, BMT Sea Beach Line and BMT West End Line
- Concourse Yard (Bronx) (IND/IRT); trains from the IND Concourse Line and IRT Jerome Avenue Line
- Linden Yard (Brooklyn) (BMT/IRT/LIRR); trains from the BMT Canarsie Line and IRT New Lots Line

=== To the national rail network ===
- BMT West End Line / South Brooklyn Railway (Brooklyn) (BMT/Mainline RR)
- Linden Yard/Bay Ridge Branch (LIRR) (Brooklyn) (BMT/IRT/LIRR); trains from the BMT Canarsie Line and IRT New Lots Line

=== Unused connections in the same division ===
In some places, there are track connections within the same division that are unused in regular service.

==== Brooklyn ====
- At Coney Island–Stillwell Avenue, see above.
- At Broadway Junction, there is an unused flyover between the BMT Canarsie Line and the BMT Jamaica Line.
- At Prospect Park, the tracks of the BMT Franklin Avenue Line become the local tracks of the BMT Brighton Line.
- At DeKalb Avenue, there is an unused connection between the BMT Brighton Line and the BMT Broadway Line via the Montague Tunnel.

==== Manhattan ====
- At West Fourth Street–Washington Square, there is an unused connection between the local tracks of the IND Eighth Avenue Line and those of the IND Sixth Avenue Line.
- Between Bowling Green and the South Ferry loops, the IRT Lexington Avenue Line and the IRT Broadway–Seventh Avenue Line have crossovers on the balloon loop tracks.
- On the 42nd Street Shuttle, there are track connections to the IRT Broadway–Seventh Avenue Line at the west end and the IRT Lexington Avenue Line at the east end. It is not possible to operate through service on this line (i.e. one cannot go from the Broadway –Seventh Avenue Line to the Lexington Avenue Line using the shuttle tracks and vice versa), though the tracks are used to transport trains to and from Livonia Yard in Brooklyn.
- South of Broad Street on the BMT Nassau Street Line, the two-track line widens to four tracks. The two inner tracks are used to store and turn J and Z trains, while the two outer tracks continue to the Montague Street Tunnel and to the BMT Fourth Avenue Line in Brooklyn.

==== Queens ====
- On the IND Rockaway Line, a single track connects the branches of the wye at Hammels, south of Broad Channel, this was used previously for round-robin shuttle service and emergency H service.

== Unused center tracks ==
Many of the New York City Subway's lines have express tracks, unused in regular service and generally only used for re-routes.

=== The Bronx ===
- IRT Jerome Avenue Line: Single center track between 149th Street–Grand Concourse and Woodlawn. Some northbound 4 trains in the morning and afternoon rush hours operate express from 167th Street until Burnside Avenue, where they short-turn.
- IRT White Plains Road Line: Single center track between East 180th Street and Wakefield–241st Street.
- IRT Dyre Avenue Line: Combinations of track and right of way between the flyover and Dyre Avenue.
- IRT Pelham Line: Single center track between Parkchester and Pelham Bay Park.
- IRT Broadway–Seventh Avenue Line: Single center track between Dyckman Street and 242nd Street.

=== Brooklyn ===
- BMT Sea Beach Line: One center track between 86th Street and Eighth Avenue. These were originally a pair of tracks which were briefly used by the NX service in 1967–1968; in 1999, one of the tracks was rehabilitated and the other was disconnected from the line leaving it unusable. The track is used occasionally for reroutes in either direction and possibly equipment testing. In the past, these tracks have been used to store rolling stock that are about to be scrapped.
- BMT West End Line: Single center track between Ninth Avenue and Bay 50th Street. Occasionally used for reroutes in either direction.
- BMT Brighton Line: Two center tracks between Brighton Beach and Ocean Parkway. These are used for layups and for terminating/turning B trains but are listed here since they are a continuation of the express tracks from the Brighton line, and exist through Ocean Parkway station.
- IND Culver Line: Single center track between Church Avenue and Avenue X.
- BMT Jamaica Line: Single center track between Myrtle Avenue and Broadway Junction.

=== Manhattan ===
- IRT Broadway–Seventh Avenue Line: Single center track between 96th Street and 145th Street.
- IRT Lenox Avenue Line: Single center track at 135th Street.

=== Queens ===
- BMT Astoria Line: Single center track between 39th Avenue and Astoria –Ditmars Boulevard. This track was last used for W trains in the peak direction, and being unpopular with residents, was discontinued on January 15, 2002.
- IND Fulton Street Line and IND Rockaway Line: On the Fulton Street Line, a single center track between Rockaway Boulevard and west of 88th Street (the track continues through 80th Street but leads only to the Pitkin Yard), and two center tracks from north of Aqueduct to south of Howard Beach–JFK Airport on the IND Rockaway Line.

== Non-underground sections ==
A map of the New York City Subway by line placement. Underground is in orange. Elevated, at-grade, embankment, open-cut is in blue.

Despite "subway" implying underground travel, the following segments are located above ground or at grade level and comprise about 40% of the trackage.

=== The Bronx ===
- IRT Broadway–Seventh Avenue Line from south of 231st Street to Van Cortlandt Park–242nd Street
- IRT Jerome Avenue Line from 149th Street–Grand Concourse to Woodlawn
- IRT White Plains Road Line from Third Avenue–149th Street to Wakefield–241st Street
- Entire IRT Dyre Avenue Line, except for Pelham Parkway
- IRT Pelham Line from Hunts Point Avenue to Pelham Bay Park

=== Brooklyn ===
- BMT Jamaica Line from west of Marcy Avenue (on the Williamsburg Bridge) to 75th Street–Elderts Lane
- BMT Myrtle Avenue Line from west of Central Avenue to Myrtle–Wyckoff Avenues
- Entire IRT New Lots Line
- Entire BMT Sea Beach Line
- Entire BMT West End Line
- BMT Canarsie Line at Wilson Avenue (southbound platform elevated, northbound platform is actually on street level but in tunnel below elevated southbound platform), and from Broadway Junction to Canarsie–Rockaway Parkway (Note: At Wilson Avenue, the southbound track is above ground while the northbound one is at-grade. However, the land directly adjacent to the subway station makes the lower level northbound track look as though it is underground, and the upper level southbound track look at-grade.)
- IND Culver Line from south of Carroll Street to Fourth Avenue/Ninth Street, and south of Church Avenue to Coney Island–Stillwell Avenue
- BMT Brighton Line from Prospect Park to Coney Island–Stillwell Avenue
- Entire BMT Franklin Avenue Line
- Both Manhattan Bridge lines

=== Manhattan ===
- IRT Broadway–Seventh Avenue Line at 125th Street and from Dyckman Street to north of 225th Street.
- IRT Lenox Avenue Line is at street level at Harlem–148th Street.
- BMT Jamaica Line on the Williamsburg Bridge
- Both Manhattan Bridge lines

=== Queens ===
- BMT Jamaica Line from 75th Street–Elderts Lane to east of 121st Street
- BMT Myrtle Avenue Line from Myrtle–Wyckoff Avenues to Middle Village–Metropolitan Avenue
- Entire BMT Astoria Line
- IRT Flushing Line from Hunters Point Avenue to west of Flushing–Main Street
- IND Fulton Street Line east of Grant Avenue
- Entire IND Rockaway Line

== Trackage ==
A map of the New York City Subway by the number of tracks on line segments.

At minimum, in normal revenue service, all lines have two tracks, with one exception: the BMT Franklin Avenue Line has a single track between Franklin Avenue and Park Place.

=== Three-tracked portions ===
The New York City Subway has fewer triple track sections than it has quadruple track sections. These sections are listed below. The third track, when in use, is generally for peak-direction express service or reroutes, with exceptions noted below.

1. IRT Broadway–Seventh Avenue Line (1 train) from south of Van Cortlandt Park–242nd Street to north of Dyckman Street and from north of 145th Street to north of 96th Street
2. IRT White Plains Road Line (2 and 5 trains) from south of Wakefield–241st Street to east of Third Avenue–149th Street
3. IRT Lenox Avenue Line (2 and 3 trains) at 135th Street – center track is not usable in revenue service
4. IRT Jerome Avenue Line (4 train) – entire line, except for Woodlawn
5. IRT Dyre Avenue Line (5 train) – entire line
6. IRT Pelham Line (6 and <6> trains) – entire line
7. IRT Flushing Line (7 and <7> trains) – from 33rd Street–Rawson Street to Flushing–Main Street
8. IRT New Lots Line (2, 3, 4, and 5 trains) at Junius Street – center track is not usable in revenue service
9. IND Fulton Street Line (A train) – from west of 80th Street to west of Ozone Park–Lefferts Boulevard; the westernmost portion of this track goes to Pitkin Yard
10. BMT West End Line (D, R, and W trains) – from Ninth Avenue to Bay 50th Street
11. IND Concourse Line (B and D trains) – from 145th Street to Bedford Park Boulevard
12. IND Culver Line (F and <F> trains) – from south of Church Avenue to Avenue X
13. BMT Jamaica Line (J, M, and Z trains) – from Marcy Avenue to Broadway Junction. Also, at 111th Street, the center track is not usable in revenue service
14. BMT Canarsie Line (L train) at East 105th Street – easternmost track is not usable in revenue service
15. BMT Astoria Line (N and W trains) – from east of Queensboro Plaza to south of Astoria–Ditmars Boulevard
16. IND Crosstown Line (G train) at Bedford–Nostrand Avenues – middle track can be used to turn trains coming from either direction
17. BMT Broadway Line at Whitehall Street – middle track used to turn southbound (W) and northbound (R) trains
18. BMT Sea Beach Line (Eighth Avenue to 86th Street)

Additionally, there are several pocket tracks in the subway where the line temporarily widens from two to three tracks, such as east of Eighth Avenue on the BMT Canarsie Line, and south of Court Square on the IND Crosstown Line.

=== Four-tracked portions ===
Quadruple-tracked portions of track are fairly common in the subway system. This makes it unique among most metro systems in the world, as most others only have two tracks per line. Generally, these portions are a pair of express and a pair of local tracks unless otherwise noted.

1. Trunk lines:
  1. IND Sixth Avenue Line between Broadway– Lafayette Street and 47th–50th Streets
  2. IND Eighth Avenue Line between Chambers Street–World Trade Center and 168th Street, and again at Dyckman Street (two local tracks and two tracks leading to the 207th Street Yard)
  3. IRT Lexington Avenue Line between Brooklyn Bridge–City Hall and 125th Street
  4. IRT Broadway–Seventh Avenue Line between Chambers and 96th Streets
  5. BMT Broadway Line between Canal Street and 57th Street–Seventh Avenue
  6. BMT Nassau Street Line at Chambers Street (originally a four platform station)
2. Branch lines:
  Manhattan branches:
  1. 63rd Street Lines at Lexington Avenue (two levels of one-direction tracks, with both levels containing one track each of IND and BMT, with connections between lines on both levels)
  2. Chrystie Street Connection (one pair IND and one pair BMT)
  3. Manhattan Bridge (one pair of tracks on each of the north and south sides of the bridge)
  Queens branches:
  1. IND Queens Boulevard Line east of Queens Plaza
  2. IND Rockaway Line north of Jamaica Bay
  3. Archer Avenue Lines from Sutphin Boulevard and east (two levels of paired tracks: all IND on one, all BMT on the other, without connections between lines)
  4. IRT Flushing Line and BMT Astoria Line at Queensboro Plaza (two levels of one-direction tracks, with both levels containing one track each of IRT and BMT, with a non-revenue connection between lines on upper level)
  Brooklyn branches:
  1. IRT Eastern Parkway Line (entire line)
  2. IND Culver Line north of Church Avenue
  3. IND Fulton Street Line between Hoyt–Schermerhorn Streets and Euclid Avenue
  4. BMT Brighton Line between Ocean Parkway and Prospect Park
  5. BMT Fourth Avenue Line north of 59th Street
  6. Manhattan Bridge (one pair of tracks on each of the north and south sides of the bridge)

The Bronx has no four-tracked lines. Pocket tracks are not included.

== Defunct lines ==
The following New York City Subway lines are either entirely defunct or have major portions no longer in service. Defunct spur lines with one station, such as the South Ferry loops, are not included in this list, nor are surface transit lines.

Division	Line	Borough(s)	Opened	Closed	Structure	Status
A (IRT)	Second Avenue Line	Manhattan	March 1, 1880	June 13, 1942	elevated	Entirely demolished
A (IRT)	Third Avenue Line	Manhattan	August 26, 1878	May 12, 1955	elevated	Entirely demolished
A (IRT)	Third Avenue Line	Bronx	August 26, 1878	April 28, 1973	elevated	Entirely demolished; had been replaced for a time by the Bx55 and then Bx15 Limited buses.
B (BMT)	Third Avenue Line	Brooklyn	October 1, 1893	May 31, 1940	elevated	Entirely demolished
B (BMT)	Fifth Avenue Line	Brooklyn	1888–1890	May 31, 1940	elevated	Entirely demolished
A (IRT)	Sixth Avenue Line	Manhattan	1878	December 4, 1938	elevated	Entirely demolished
A (IRT)	Ninth Avenue Line	Manhattan	July 1, 1868	June 11, 1940	elevated	Entirely demolished
A (IRT)	Ninth Avenue Line	Bronx	July 1, 1868	August 31, 1958	elevated	Entirely demolished, except for the two underground stations at Sedgwick Avenue and Anderson–Jerome Avenues in the Bronx
B (BMT)	Canarsie Line	Brooklyn	1865	November 21, 1942	at-grade	Line from Canarsie–Rockaway Parkway to Canarsie Pier replaced with a streetcar line, which itself was replaced by the B42 bus.
B (BMT)	Culver Line	Brooklyn	1875		elevated	Line from Ditmas Avenue to Coney Island–Stillwell Avenue taken over by the IND in 1954
B (BMT)	Culver Line	Brooklyn	1875	May 11, 1975	elevated	Remainder of line to Ninth Avenue abandoned, then demolished in 1985.
B (BMT)	Fulton Street Line	Brooklyn	1888–1894	a) May 31, 1940 b) April 26, 1956	elevated	a) Line demolished west of Rockaway Avenue. b) Remainder of line in Brooklyn demolished.
B (BMT)	Fulton Street Line	Queens	September 25, 1915		elevated	Line taken over by the IND in 1956, with the western two-block section rebuilt to connect with Grant Avenue.
A (IRT)	IRT trunk line	Manhattan	1904		underground	Separated into the Broadway–Seventh Avenue, Lexington Avenue and 42nd Street Shuttle lines^{[a]}
B (BMT)	Lexington Avenue Line	Brooklyn	May 13, 1885	1889–1950	elevated	Line west of Gates Avenue demolished
B (BMT)	Jamaica Line	Brooklyn	1885–1888	July 3, 1916	elevated	Line west of Marcy Avenue demolished
B (BMT)	Jamaica Line	Queens	1918	a) September 10, 1977 b) April 15, 1985	elevated	a) Line east of Queens Boulevard demolished. b) Line east of 121st Street demolished. Both segments were replaced with Q49 bus service, which itself was replaced in 1988 by the BMT Archer Avenue Line.
B (BMT)	Myrtle Avenue Line	Brooklyn	1888–1889	1944–1969	elevated	Line west of Central Avenue through Broadway to Lewis Avenue abandoned. Remainder of line west of Lewis Avenue demolished.
B (IND)	World's Fair Line	Queens	1939	1940	at-grade	Entirely demolished.

=== Vestiges of former lines ===
- IRT White Plains Road Line: Just north of the Third Avenue–149th Street station, exiting the tunnel portal, one can see the initial framework of the IRT Third Avenue Line. There used to be a connection from the White Plains Road line to the Third Avenue El, which ran south across the Harlem River to Manhattan.
- IRT White Plains Road Line: The other end of the Third Avenue El connected to the White Plains Road line at the lower level of the Gun Hill Road station (closed 1973). Also on the White Plains Road line is the remnant of the short section of track to the original Bronx Park terminal.
- IRT Jerome Avenue Line: North of the 161st Street–Yankee Stadium station is the framework for the connection from the IRT Ninth Avenue Line.
- IRT Dyre Avenue Line: The Dyre Avenue Line was part of the New York, Westchester, and Boston Railway; it continued north beyond Eastchester–Dyre Avenue to White Plains and Port Chester; and south of the present connection to the White Plains Road line at East 180th Street, to 133rd Street where it ran alongside the New Haven Railroad. The platforms of the NYW&B station are still visible at East 180th Street station and are sometimes used to store trains. The structure south of East 180th Street ends abruptly at Lebanon Street.
- IRT Flushing Line: Part of the trackway from the Queensboro Bridge and the IRT Second Avenue Line is still visible at the east end of Queensboro Plaza.
- BMT Nassau Street Line/BMT Broadway Line: The BMT Nassau Street Line used to connect to the south side of the Manhattan Bridge north of Chambers Street. The trackways were disconnected from the Manhattan Bridge after the Chrystie Street Connection opened. Also, heading northbound over the Manhattan Bridge north side, an abandoned tunnel is visible before entering Grand Street. Heading northbound on the south side, the remains of the tunnel to the BMT Nassau Street Line loop is briefly visible. This area was reconfigured as part of the Chrystie Street Connection.
- BMT Fulton Street Line: Trackways are still visible at BMT Canarsie Line stations at Broadway Junction and Atlantic Avenue. Framework for the el was up until early 1998, visible at the Franklin Avenue Shuttle station at Franklin Avenue–Fulton Street. The structure served as a pedestrian walkway and was demolished in 1998 when the station and the Franklin Avenue Line was rebuilt as a single-tracked line.
- BMT Fulton Street Line: On the IND Fulton Street Line heading westbound from 80th Street, one can see the stub end of the old BMT Fulton Street Line continuing straight ahead while the IND Fulton Street Line curves into Grant Avenue, an underground station.
- BMT Culver Line (now IND Culver Line): At Ninth Avenue and at Ditmas Avenue, the original Culver line connected. The trackway is visible at Ditmas Avenue and the ramps are visible at Ninth Avenue.
- BMT Jamaica Line: West of Gates Avenue, one can see where the structure turned onto Lexington Avenue to head toward the Brooklyn Bridge. The structure is only visible from street level.
- BMT Jamaica Line: West of Marcy Avenue, the BMT Jamaica Line veers right onto the Williamsburg Bridge while the original structure continues straight ahead.
- BMT Jamaica Line: East of 121st Street, the 144th Street BMT powerhouse and 168th Street station house still exist along Jamaica Avenue.
- The LIRR's Rockaway Beach Branch runs from the White Pot Junction to just east of Rockaway Boulevard, where the IND Rockaway Line begins.

== See also ==
- List of New York City Subway services
- New York City Subway nomenclature
- Staten Island Railway
