= Liberty Avenue (New York City) =

Avenue in Brooklyn and Queens, New York

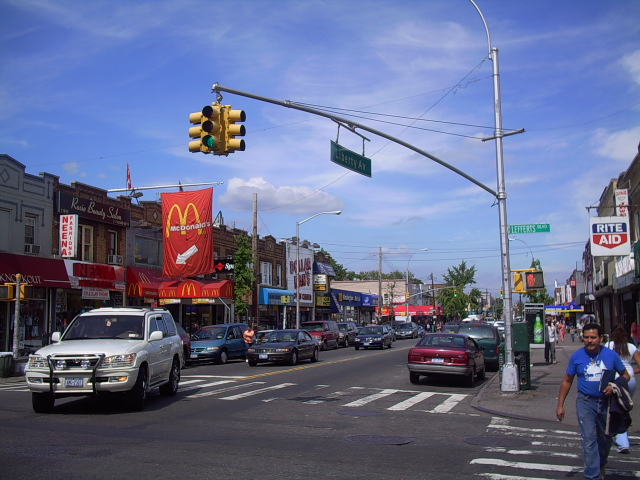
- At Lefferts Boulevard
- Interactive map of Liberty Avenue
- Owner: City of New York
- Maintained by: NYCDOT
- Length: 7.9 mi (12.7 km)
- Location: Brooklyn and Queens, New York City, New York, United States
- Nearest metro station: Fulton Street Line
- West end: Mother Gaston Boulevard in Brownsville
- Major junctions: I-678 in Jamaica
- East end: Farmers Boulevard in St. Albans

Liberty Avenue is an 8-mile (13 km) long west-east avenue in Brooklyn and Queens, New York City. It is bidirectional for most of its length, running between Mother Gaston Boulevard in Brooklyn in the west and Farmers Boulevard in Queens in the east.

A portion of Liberty Avenue in South Richmond Hill is known as "Little Guyana" because it runs through an Indo-Caribbean American neighborhood with mostly Indo-Guyanese and many Indo-Trinidadian and Tobagonian, Indo-Surinamese, and Indo-Jamaican cultures and people there. Indian clothing stores, puja stores, roti shops, Caribbean bakeries, Hindu temples, mosques, and other Indo-Caribbean American businesses are on this portion of Liberty Avenue. Parallel to Liberty Avenue is 101st Avenue which was renamed Little Punjab, due its similar presence of Punjabi Indians and other South Asian cultures.

Liberty Avenue was co-named "Little Guyana Avenue" on May 29, 2021.

== Transportation ==
Liberty Avenue is served by the following:

- The IND Fulton Street Line (A train) runs above the avenue between 80th Street and Lefferts Boulevard. A station named Liberty Avenue (A and C trains) is located at Pennsylvania Avenue.
- The Q112 bus serves the avenue between Waltham Street and either Rockaway Boulevard (East New York) or Cross Bay Boulevard (Jamaica).
- East from 165th Street, the Q42 goes to 177th Street, and Q83 buses continue to the avenue’s eastern end.
- The Q8 runs on two portions. One is from 101st Avenue (west end) to Grant Avenue (Gateway Mall) or from Forbell Street to 76th Street in Queens (Jamaica Bus Terminal). The other portion is used only by Jamaica-bound buses from Waltham Street to Sutphin Boulevard.
- The Q9 runs from 153rd Street to Sutphin Boulevard (Jamaica) and from 101st Avenue to the Van Wyck Expressway (South Ozone Park). This portion is also run by the QM64 from Van Wyck Expressway in both directions, which continues until the avenue’s eastern end.

== See also ==
- 1984 Palm Sunday massacre, a mass shooting that occurred in a home located on Liberty Avenue in 1984 resulting in 10 deaths.
