= Clark Street and Tillary Street stations =

Clark Street Tillary Street

General information
- Location: Fulton Street & Clark and Tillary Streets; Brooklyn Heights, Downtown Brooklyn, Brooklyn, New York
- Coordinates: 40.696698°N 73.991341°W
- Line: BRT Fulton Street Line
- Platforms: 2 side platforms
- Tracks: 2

Construction
- Structure type: Elevated

History
- Opened: April 24, 1888; 138 years ago
- Closed: June 1, 1902; 124 years ago
Location

The Clark Street and Tillary Street stations were a station pair on the demolished BRT Fulton Street Line, located on Fulton Street (now Cadman Plaza West) at Clark Street and Tillary Street in Brooklyn, New York City. It was also served by trains traveling via what is now the BMT Brighton Line.

== History ==
The station was one of the original BRT Fulton Street Line stations opened by the Kings County Elevated Railway on April 24, 1888. Eastbound trains would stop at Clark Street, while westbound trains would stop at Tillary Street. Both stations were located at a junction where the Fulton Street Line split between the Fulton Ferry and the Brooklyn Bridge into Manhattan. In 1896, the BRT Brighton Line joined the stations between the Brooklyn Bridge and Franklin Avenue. The stations and the line were acquired by the Brooklyn Rapid Transit Company in November 1899 and Brooklyn Union Elevated on May 24, 1900.

In late-November 1901, the station was one of six that were proposed for abandonment by the BRT. The others planned for closing were Boerum Place, Lafayette Avenue, Cumberland Avenue, and Vanderbilt Avenue. The four stations mentioned survived well into the abandonment of the Fulton El west of Rockaway Avenue, but the Clark Street Station and Tillary Street Station didn't. The control tower was the only surviving remnant of the station, after it closed. The site of the former elevated station is located within the vicinity of the southwest end of the Brooklyn War Memorial Park, and the northwest corner of the Korean War Veterans Plaza in Cadman Plaza.
