= Elm Place–Duffield Street station =

Elm Pl. & Duffield St.

General information
- Location: Fulton Street between Duffield Street & Elm Place; Downtown Brooklyn, Brooklyn, New York
- Coordinates: 40.690242°N 73.984330°W
- Line: BMT Fulton Street Line
- Platforms: 2 side platform
- Tracks: 2

Construction
- Structure type: Elevated

History
- Opened: April 24, 1888; 138 years ago
- Closed: June 1, 1940; 86 years ago

Former services
| Preceding station | BMT Lines | Following station |
|---|---|---|
| Boerum Place toward Park Row or Fulton Ferry | 13: Fulton Street Local | Flatbush Avenue toward Lefferts Avenue |
Location

The Elm Place–Duffield Street station was a station on the demolished BMT Fulton Street Line in Brooklyn, New York City. The Fulton Street Elevated was built by the Kings County Elevated Railway Company and this station started service on April 24, 1888. The station had 2 tracks and 2 offset side platforms. It was served by trains of the BMT Fulton Street Line, and until 1920, trains of the BMT Brighton Line.

== History ==
This station was served by steam locomotives between 1888 and 1899. In 1898, the Brooklyn Rapid Transit Company (BRT) absorbed the Kings County Elevated Railway, and it took over the Fulton Street El, and it was electrified on July 3, 1899. It closed on June 1, 1940, when all service from Fulton Ferry and Park Row to Rockaway Avenue was abandoned, as it came under city ownership. Current rapid transit service at these intersections consists of entrances to the Hoyt Street subway station on the IRT Eastern Parkway Line built in 1908.
