= Vanderbilt Avenue station =

Vanderbilt Avenue station may refer to:

- Vanderbilt Avenue (BMT Fulton Street Line), a station on the demolished BMT Fulton Street Line
- Vanderbilt Avenue (BMT Myrtle Avenue Line), a station on the demolished BMT Myrtle Avenue Line
