= Vanderbilt Avenue =

Streets in New York City

Vanderbilt Avenue is the name of three thoroughfares in the New York City boroughs of Brooklyn, Manhattan, and Staten Island. They were named after Cornelius Vanderbilt (1794–1877), the builder of Grand Central Terminal in Midtown Manhattan.

== Brooklyn ==
Vanderbilt Avenue
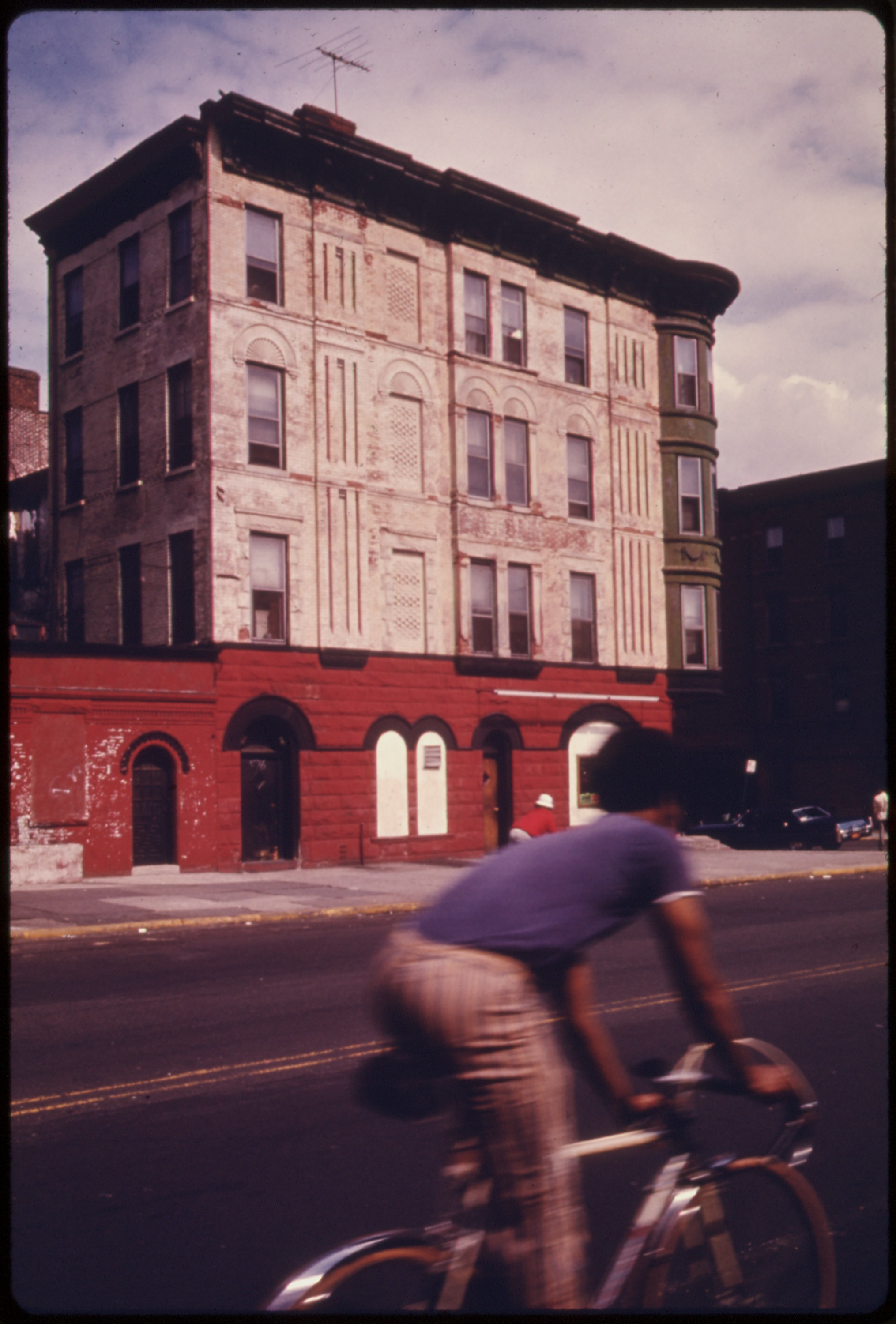
- Vanderbilt Avenue in Brooklyn, pictured in 1974
- Namesake: Cornelius Vanderbilt
- Owner: City of New York
- Maintained by: NYCDOT
- Location: Brooklyn, New York City
- South end: Grand Army Plaza at Prospect Park
- North end: Flushing Avenue at Brooklyn Navy Yard

Vanderbilt Avenue in Brooklyn carries traffic north and south between Grand Army Plaza (40°40′30″N 73°58′11″W) and Flushing Avenue at the Vanderbilt Avenue gate of the Brooklyn Navy Yard (40°41′52″N 73°58′14.5″W).

This avenue serves the neighborhoods of Fort Greene and Prospect Heights. Landmarks include the old Public School 9 and Public School 9 Annex buildings at the corner of Sterling Place, and Bishop Loughlin Memorial High School at Greene Avenue.

The B69 bus, which replaced a streetcar line in 1950, runs on the entire avenue, with Kensington service heading north on Flatbush Avenue from the southern end. There were also two now-demolished subway stations on the BMT Myrtle Avenue Line and BMT Fulton Street Line built here.

== Manhattan ==
Vanderbilt Avenue
- Namesake: Cornelius Vanderbilt
- Owner: City of New York
- Maintained by: NYCDOT
- Location: Manhattan, New York City
- South end: 43rd Street in Midtown
- North end: 47th Street in Midtown
- East: Park Avenue
- West: Madison Avenue

Vanderbilt Avenue in Manhattan runs from 43rd Street to 47th Street between Park Avenue and Madison Avenue. It was built in the late 1860s as the result of the construction of Grand Central Depot. The southbound Park Avenue Viaduct around Grand Central Terminal runs above the street's eastern side. The Yale Club of New York City is located on Vanderbilt Avenue, at the intersection of East 44th Street, as is the Manhattan Institute for Policy Research, and One Vanderbilt supertall skyscraper.

When the avenue was originally designed, it ran from 42nd Street to 49th Street. However, in the 1960s the portion between 47th Street and 49th Street was closed permanently, as it became part of 270 Park Avenue and 280 Park Avenue. More recently, the southern end of the avenue, between 42nd Street and 43rd Street was converted into a pedestrian plaza that connects Grand Central Terminal with the One Vanderbilt skyscraper.

== Staten Island ==
Vanderbilt Avenue runs northeast–southwest through East Shore. It is approximately 1 mile (1.6 km) long and serves the neighborhoods of Clifton, Stapleton Heights, Concord, and Grymes Hill. The northeast end is on Bay Street (40°37′20″N 74°4′23″W), west of Clifton of the Staten Island Railway and east of Bayley Seton Hospital.

Along with most of Richmond Road and all of Amboy Road, Vanderbilt Avenue forms the first leg of Staten Island's colonial-era eastern corridor that predates the newer, straighter, and wider Hylan Boulevard. The three roads that make up the corridor share a common numbering system; i.e. Richmond Road's numbers start where Vanderbilt Avenue's leave off, (40°36′48″N 74°5′13.4″W) and Amboy Road's numbers start where Amboy Road forks away from Richmond Road. This numbering format encompasses the numerically highest of street addresses in New York City, and spans 15 miles combined, approximately 1 mile longer than Hylan Boulevard. Other roads that fork off of this corridor are: St. Paul's Avenue, Van Duzer Street, Targee Street, Rockland Avenue, Bloomingdale Road, and Richmond Valley Road. This street is served by the S76 and S86 bus routes.
