= Lafayette station =

Lafayette station may refer to:

- Lafayette station (Indiana), an Amtrak station in Lafayette, Indiana
- Lafayette station (Louisiana), an Amtrak station in Lafayette, Louisiana
- Lafayette station (BART), a train station in Lafayette, California

== See also ==
- Lafayette Square (Metro Rail), a Buffalo Metro Rail station
- Lafayette Avenue (BMT Fulton Street Line), a former New York City Subway station
- Lafayette Avenue (IND Fulton Street Line), a New York City Subway station
