= Cumberland Avenue station (BMT Fulton Street Line) =

Cumberland Ave.

General information
- Location: Fulton Street and Cumberland Avenue; Fort Greene, Brooklyn, New York
- Coordinates: 40.685456°N 73.972282°W
- Line: BMT Fulton Street Line
- Platforms: 2 side platforms
- Tracks: 2
- Connections: Greene and Gates Avenues Line

Construction
- Structure type: Elevated

History
- Opened: April 24, 1888; 138 years ago
- Closed: June 1, 1940; 86 years ago

Former services
Preceding station	BMT Lines	Following station
Lafayette Avenue toward Park Row or Fulton Ferry	13: Fulton Street Local	Vanderbilt Avenue toward Lefferts Avenue
Location

Cumberland Avenue (also known as Cumberland Street) was a station on the demolished BMT Fulton Street Line. The Fulton Street Elevated was built by the Kings County Elevated Railway Company and this station started service on April 24, 1888. The station had 2 tracks and 2 offset side platforms. It was served by trains of the BMT Fulton Street Line, and until 1920, trains of the BMT Brighton Line. This station was served by steam locomotives between 1888 and 1899. In 1898, the Brooklyn Rapid Transit Company (BRT) absorbed the Kings County Elevated Railway, and it took over the Fulton Street El, and it was electrified on July 3, 1899. It also had a connection to the Greene and Gates Avenues Line trolleys. In 1936, the Independent Subway System built the Fulton Street subway and added a station nearby named Lafayette Avenue despite the fact that it was two blocks southeast of its namesake. The el station became obsolete, and it closed on June 1, 1940, when all service from Fulton Ferry and Park Row to Rockaway Avenue was abandoned, as it came under city ownership.
