= Lafayette Avenue =

Lafayette Avenue may refer to:

- Lafayette Avenue (BMT Fulton Street Line)
- Lafayette Avenue (IND Fulton Street Line)
- Lafayette Avenue (Baltimore), a street in Baltimore
