= Hinsdale Street station =

Hinsdale Street
- Former New York City Subway station

Station statistics
- Address: Pitkin Avenue and Hinsdale Street; Brooklyn, NY 11207
- Borough: Brooklyn
- Locale: East New York
- Coordinates: 40.671205°N 73.900496°W
- Division: B (BMT)
- Line: BMT Fulton Street Line
- Services: None (demolished)
- Transit: Bergen Street Line
- Structure: Elevated
- Platforms: 2 side platforms
- Tracks: 3

Other information
- Opened: November 17, 1918; 107 years ago
- Closed: April 26, 1956; 69 years ago

Station succession
- Next west: Atlantic Avenue
- Next east: Pennsylvania Avenue
Location

Street map
Station service legend
| Symbol | Description |
| Stops all times | Stops in station at all times |
| Stops all times except late nights | Stops all times except late nights |
| Stops late nights only | Stops late nights only |
| Stops late nights and weekends | Stops late nights and weekends only |
| Stops weekdays during the day | Stops weekdays during the day |
| Stops weekends during the day | Stops weekends during the day |
| Stops all times except rush hours in the peak direction | Stops all times except rush hours in the peak direction |
| Stops all times except weekdays in the peak direction | Stops all times except weekdays in the peak direction |
| Stops daily except rush hours in the peak direction | Stops all times except nights and rush hours in the peak direction |
| Stops rush hours only | Stops rush hours only |
| Stops rush hours in the peak direction only | Stops rush hours in the peak direction only |
| Station closed | Station is closed |
(Details about time periods)

The Hinsdale Street station was a station on the demolished BMT Fulton Street Line in Brooklyn, New York City, at Pitkin Avenue and Hinsdale Street. It had 3 tracks and 2 side platforms. It opened on November 17, 1918, as a replacement for Eastern Parkway station one block to the west on Snediker Avenue, as part of the Dual Contracts, and had a connecting spur to the BMT Lexington Avenue Line via Manhattan Beach Crossing. It was served by BMT 13 trains until 1940, when they were replaced with BMT 12 trains. It also had a connection to the Bergen Street Line trolleys. It closed on April 26, 1956, along with the rest of the remaining segment of the Fulton Elevated Line west of Hudson Street. The station was not replaced with an underground IND Fulton Street Line station, which runs north along Pennsylvania Avenue towards Broadway Junction; the nearest existing station is Sutter Avenue on the BMT Canarsie Line.

West of the station, the line veered north onto Van Sinderen Avenue towards Atlantic Avenue, sharing the right-of-way with the Canarsie Line. The former trackways are still present.
