= Franklin Avenue station (Fulton Street) =

New York City Subway station in Brooklyn

Franklin Avenue
- New York City Subway station complex
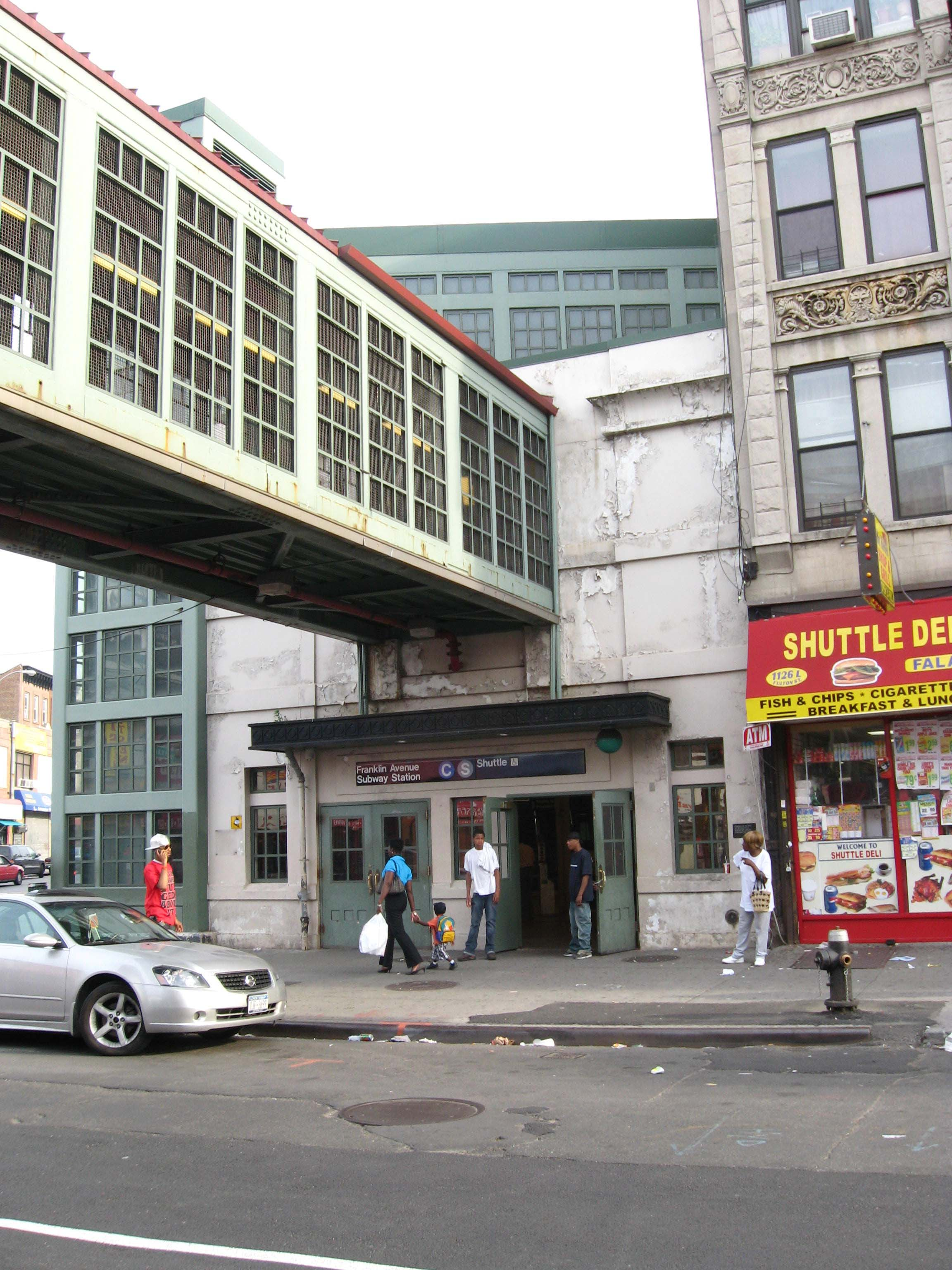
- Entrance on south side of Fulton Street

Station statistics
- Address: Franklin Avenue and Fulton Street; Brooklyn, New York
- Borough: Brooklyn
- Locale: Bedford–Stuyvesant
- Coordinates: 40.681126°N 73.955712°W
- Division: B (BMT/IND)
- Line: BMT Franklin Avenue Line; IND Fulton Street Line
- Services: A (late nights); C (all except late nights); S (all times)
- Transit: NYCT Bus: B25, B48, B49
- Levels: 2

Other information
- Opened: October 18, 1999; 27 years ago
- Accessible: Yes

Traffic
- 2025: 1,332,893 ▲3.7%
- Rank: 251 out of 423
Location
Location within New York City Subway
Location within New York City
Location within New York
Street map
Station service legend
Symbol	Description
Stops all times except late nights	Stops all times except late nights
Stops all times	Stops all times
Stops late nights only	Stops late nights only

The Franklin Avenue station is a station complex shared by the BMT Franklin Avenue Line and the IND Fulton Street Line of the New York City Subway, located at Franklin Avenue and Fulton Street in Bedford–Stuyvesant, Brooklyn. It is served by the Franklin Avenue Shuttle at all times, and by the C train at all times except late nights, when the A train takes over service.

== BMT Franklin Avenue Line platform ==
Franklin Avenue
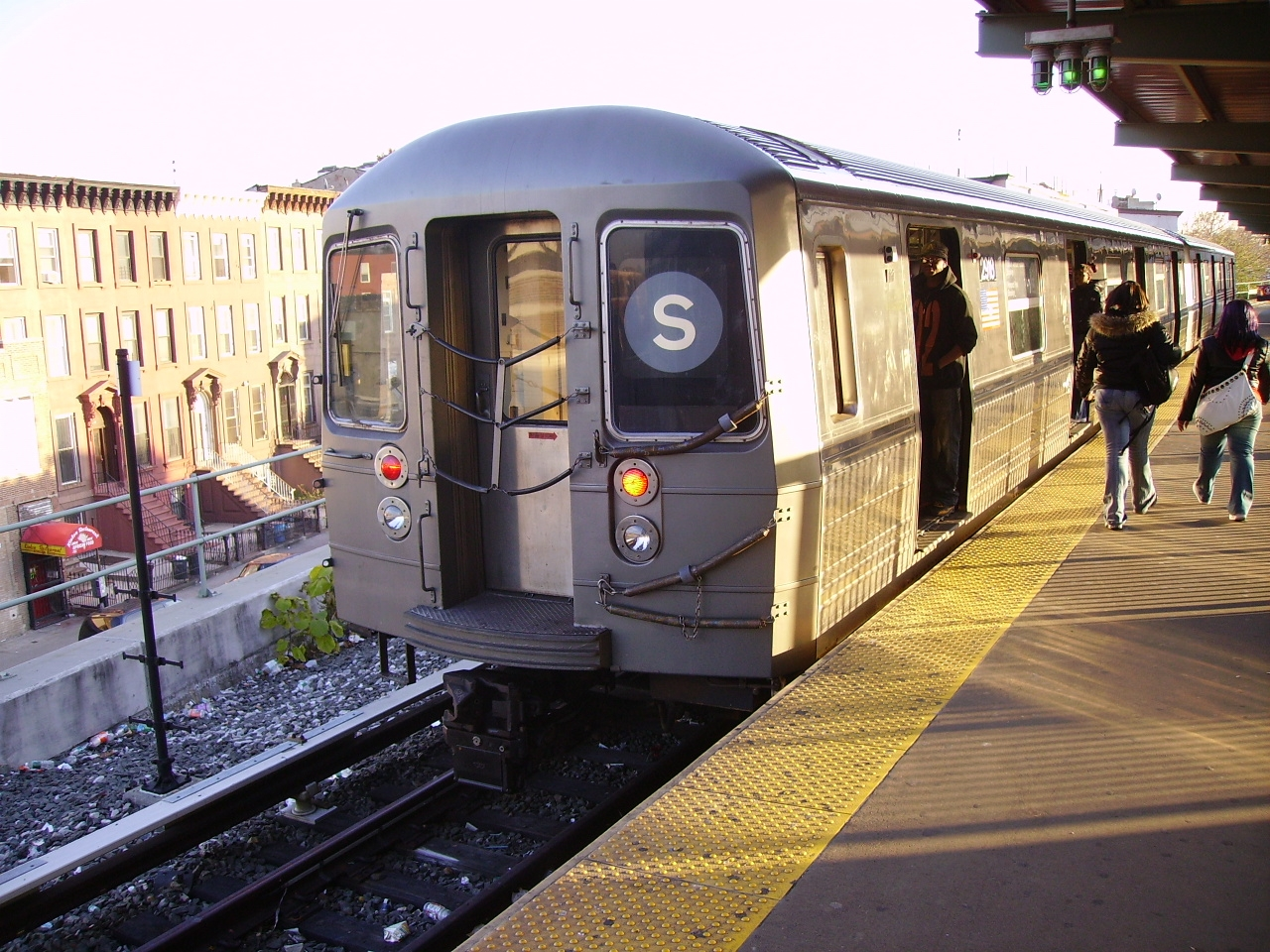
- Two-car train of R68s terminating at Franklin Avenue

Station statistics
- Division: B (BMT)
- Line: BMT Franklin Avenue Line
- Services: S (all times)
- Structure: Elevated
- Platforms: 1 side platform
- Tracks: 1

Other information
- Opened: August 15, 1896; 130 years ago
- Rebuilt: 1924; 102 years ago (Dual Contracts); October 18, 1999; 27 years ago (shuttle refurbishment)
- Former/other names: Franklin Avenue–Fulton Street
Services
Preceding station	New York City Subway	Following station
Terminus	Franklin Avenue	Park Place toward Prospect Park
Non-revenue services and lines
Preceding station	New York City Subway	Following station
Terminus	no service	Dean Street demolished
Track layout
Station service legend
Symbol	Description
Stops all times	Stops all times

The Franklin Avenue station on the BMT Franklin Avenue Line has one track and one side platform. It is the northern terminal of the Franklin Avenue Shuttle.

=== History ===
This elevated station opened on August 15, 1896, to connect with the adjacent Franklin Avenue station of the Fulton Street Elevated (see § BMT Fulton Street Line platforms). It was a replacement for the August 18, 1878-built Bedford Terminal station originally built by the Brooklyn, Flatbush and Coney Island Railway. It was a two-track through station with side platforms. Just before the Fulton Street Line station, steam railroad trains from the Fulton Street Line turned south onto the BMT Brighton Line to access Brighton Beach. The station also had a connection with the Franklin Avenue Line streetcars, as well as Fulton Street Line streetcars.

In 1920, the track connection to the Fulton Street Line was severed as Brighton Line trains to Downtown Brooklyn and Manhattan were rerouted via a new tunnel under Flatbush Avenue. In 1924, the station was rebuilt as a single-track station. The former westbound (now northbound) track was decked over with a wood platform to accommodate crowds transferring between the Fulton Street and Franklin Avenue Lines. The station platforms were also extended south to accommodate longer trains. Originally accommodated for five elevated BU cars for a length of ~250 ft (~76 m), they were now able to hold six subway-type AB Standard cars for a length of ~402 feet (~123 m).

The next stop to the south was Dean Street for Brighton Line trains. Before the track connection to the Fulton Street Line was severed, the next stop to the west was Grand Avenue. When the BMT system was taken over by the City of New York on June 1, 1940, the Fulton Street Elevated Line was closed and later demolished while paper transfers were issued at Franklin Avenue for passengers to access the new IND Fulton Street Line subway.

In 1985, the station had only 210 paying daily riders on a typical weekday in 1985 not counting farebeaters, making it one of the least used stations in the system.

=== Rehabilitation ===
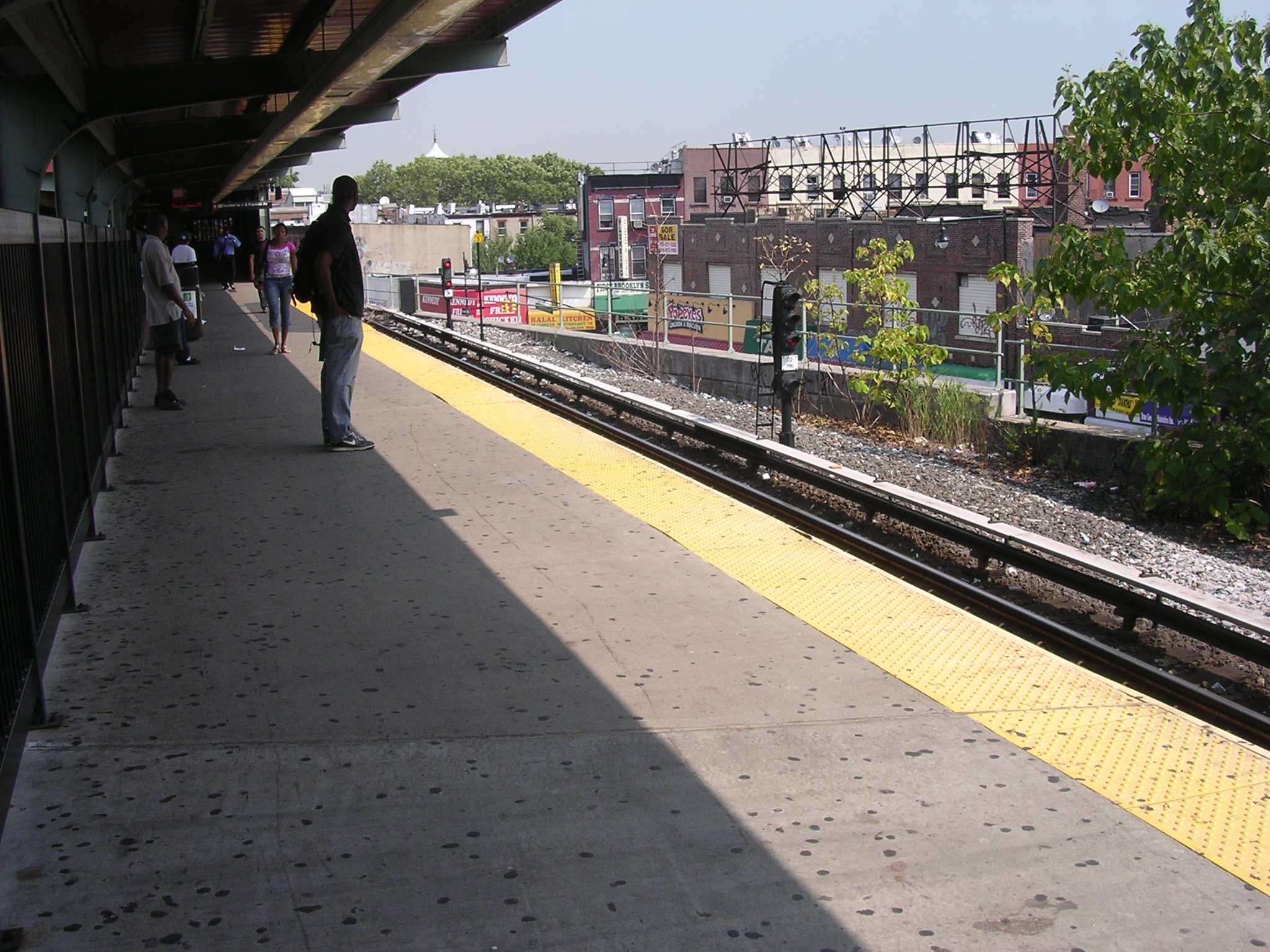
Platform awaiting shuttle train

This station was completely rebuilt between 1998 and 1999 as a single-track station with a single platform on the west side of the track. The new platform is only 180 feet (55 metres) long and can accommodate a train of two 75 ft (23 m)-long cars, or three 60 ft (18 m)-long cars. The track ends at a bumper block at the north end of the platform.

The 1999 artwork here is called Life and Continued Growth by Eric Pryor. It consists of stained glass panels on the top of the entranceway to the shuttle platform.

In 2024, Skanska was hired to replace 21 escalators across the New York City Subway system for $146 million, including one escalator at the Franklin Avenue station.

=== Exit ===
At the north end of the platform is the station's main station house, a three-story building on the southwest corner of Fulton Street and Franklin Avenue that connects to both platforms of Franklin Avenue on the IND Fulton Street Line. One up-only escalator and one long staircase go down to the fare control area at ground level, where one staircase goes down to the southbound IND platform and one turnstile bank provides access to/from the station. A set of doors then lead out to the streets after the token booth.

The shuttle platform has another short staircase that goes down to a mesh-enclosed bridge above Fulton Street. On the other end is an elevator and one staircase going down to the northbound IND platform. A second elevator from the shuttle platform goes down to the overpass, main fare control area, and the southbound IND platform. These two elevators make the entire station complex ADA-accessible.

== IND Fulton Street Line platforms ==
Franklin Avenue
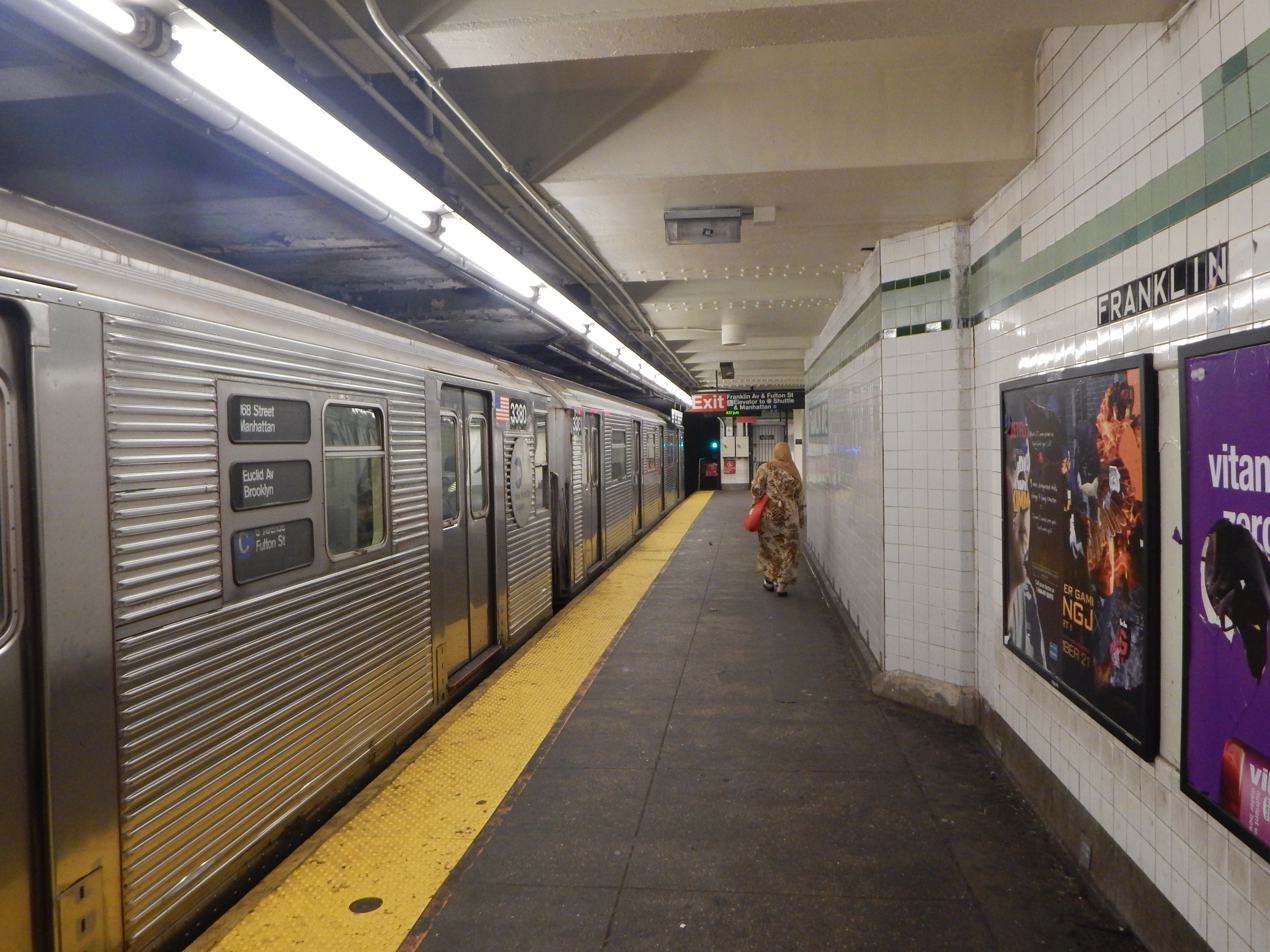
- Southbound R32 C train leaving the station

Station statistics
- Division: B (IND)
- Line: IND Fulton Street Line
- Services: A (late nights); C (all except late nights)
- Structure: Underground
- Platforms: 2 side platforms
- Tracks: 4

Other information
- Opened: April 9, 1936; 90 years ago
- Accessible: Yes
Services
Preceding station	New York City Subway	Following station
Clinton–Washington Avenues A C toward 168th Street	Local	Nostrand Avenue A C toward Euclid Avenue
Track layout
Station service legend
Symbol	Description
Stops all times except late nights	Stops all times except late nights
Stops late nights only	Stops late nights only

The Franklin Avenue station is an underground local station on the IND Fulton Street Line.

=== History ===
The Franklin Avenue station was constructed as part of the IND Fulton Street Line, the main line of the city-owned Independent Subway System (IND)'s main line from Downtown Brooklyn to southern Queens. The groundbreaking for the line was held on April 16, 1929, at Fulton Street and Arlington Place. This station opened on April 9, 1936, as part of an extension of the Independent Subway System (IND) from its previous Brooklyn terminus at Jay Street–Borough Hall, which opened three years earlier, to Rockaway Avenue. The new IND subway replaced the BMT Fulton Street Elevated, and this station replaced its namesake Franklin Avenue, which closed on May 31, 1940.

When Aretha Franklin died on August 16, 2018, the Metropolitan Transportation Authority pasted sticker signs with the word "Respect" on the walls of the Franklin Avenue station, as well as the Franklin Street station in Manhattan. A Brooklyn resident had suggested adding the signs after impromptu tributes to Franklin had arisen at these two stations.

=== Station layout ===
Opened on April 9, 1936, it has four tracks and two side platforms. The two center express tracks are used by the A train during daytime hours.

Both platforms have a light green trim line with a dark green border and small "FRANKLIN" tile captions below them in white lettering on a black background. The mosaic name tablets read "FRANKLIN AVE." in white sans-serif font on dark green background and light green border. Directional signs pointing to fare control are underneath some of them. Both platforms are entirely column-less.

Prior to introduction of the MetroCard, the Euclid Avenue-bound platform had a same-level fare control and an out-of-system paper transfer was handed out at either IND fare control areas (the only place in the subway where this was still being done) for access to the shuttle station only. After the MetroCard was introduced, a paper MetroCard transfer was issued from a machine that resembled a bus farebox. These transfers were good for 20 minutes and were discontinued after construction of the in-system transfer.

=== Exits ===
Fare control areas are at the extreme east (railroad south) end of the platforms. On the Manhattan-bound side, there is an unstaffed turnstile bank and one staircase going up to the northeast corner of Franklin Avenue and Fulton Street. Inside fare control, one staircase and one elevator go up to the overpass above Fulton Street that connects to the shuttle platform. On the Euclid Avenue-bound platform, a staircase goes up to the main station house, where a connection to the Franklin Avenue Shuttle is available. An elevator from the platform goes up to the shuttle platform with intermediate stops at the main station house and overpass.

Directional signs obscured with paint, along with newly tiled rooms, point to evidence of a closed exits on the west (railroad north) end of the station, which went to both eastern corners of Classon Avenue and Fulton Street. These exits were closed in the 1980s. The exit to the Manhattan-bound platform is blocked by a trapdoor, while the exit to the eastbound platform is completely sealed.

== BMT Fulton Street Line platforms ==
Franklin Ave.

General information
- Line: BMT Fulton Street Line
- Platforms: 1 side platform, 1 island platform
- Tracks: 3 tracks

Construction
- Structure type: Elevated

History
- Opened: April 24, 1888; 138 years ago
- Closed: June 1, 1940; 86 years ago

Key dates
- Platforms demolished: 1955
- Headhouse demolished: 1999

Former services
Preceding station	BMT Lines	Following station
Sands Street toward Park Row	13: Fulton Street Express	Atlantic Avenue toward Lefferts Avenue
Grand Avenue toward Park Row or Fulton Ferry	13: Fulton Street Local	Tompkins Avenue toward Lefferts Avenue
Location

This original elevated station at this intersection opened on April 24, 1888, along the demolished BMT Fulton Street Line. It was originally built by the Kings County Elevated Railway, and was not only one of the original stations along the line, but the penultimate station, until it was extended to Albany and Sumner Avenues the next month, Rockaway Avenue by the end of the year, Van Siclen Avenue in 1889, Montauk Avenue in 1892, and Grant Avenue in 1894. In 1896, the Brooklyn and Brighton Beach Railroad connected the former BF&CI line to the station. It was a two-track through station with side platforms, gaining a third track along the south side at the point where steam railroad trains from the Fulton Street Line turned onto the BMT Brighton Line to access Brighton Beach. The southern platform was shared with the northbound Brighton Line platform, with the different sections of the platform located at right angles. As with the Franklin Street platforms, the station also had a connection with the Franklin Avenue Line streetcars. The eastbound platform of the BMT Fulton Street Line and the westbound platform of the Franklin Avenue Line were already connected before 1920.

When the extension of the Montague Street Tunnel under Flatbush Avenue rerouted Brighton Line trains to Downtown Brooklyn in 1920, the track connection to the BMT Franklin and Brighton Lines were severed. The connection to the now Franklin Avenue Shuttle was rebuilt in 1924 as a single-track station. The former westbound (now northbound) track was decked over with a wood platform to accommodate crowds transferring between the Fulton Street and Franklin Avenue Lines.

The next stop to the east was Nostrand Avenue. The next stop to the west was Grand Avenue. When the BMT system was taken over by the City of New York on June 1, 1940, the Fulton Street Elevated Line was closed and later demolished, and the Franklin Avenue subway station built four years earlier by the IND, directly under the former Elevated, was used as a replacement. The short segment of the Fulton Street Elevated adjacent to the Franklin Avenue shuttle platforms remained standing until the reconstruction project of 1998 and 1999.
