= Court Street and Myrtle Avenue stations =

Court St. Myrtle Ave.

General information
- Location: Fulton Street, Court Street and Myrtle Avenue; Brooklyn Heights, Downtown Brooklyn , Brooklyn, New York
- Line: BMT Fulton Street Line
- Platforms: 2 side platform
- Tracks: 2

Construction
- Structure type: Elevated

History
- Opened: April 24, 1888; 138 years ago
- Closed: June 1, 1940; 86 years ago

Former services
Preceding station	BMT Lines	Following station
Sands Street toward Park Row	13: Fulton Street Local	Boerum Place toward Lefferts Avenue
Fulton Ferry Terminus	13: Fulton Street Local	Boerum Place toward Lefferts Avenue
Location

Court Street and Myrtle Avenue was a station pair on the demolished BMT Fulton Street Line. The Fulton Street Elevated was built by the Kings County Elevated Railway Company and this station started service on April 24, 1888. The station had 2 tracks and 2 side platforms. Eastbound trains would stop at Court Street, while westbound trains would stop at Myrtle Avenue. It was served by trains of the BMT Fulton Street Line, and until 1920, trains of the BMT Brighton Line. This station was served by steam locomotives between 1888 and 1899. In 1898, the Brooklyn Rapid Transit Company (BRT) absorbed the Kings County Elevated Railway, and it took over the Fulton Street El, and it was electrified on July 3, 1899. It also had a connection to the streetcar line of the same name. It closed on June 1, 1940, when all service from Fulton Ferry and Park Row to Rockaway Avenue was abandoned, as it came under city ownership.
