= Flatbush Avenue (disambiguation) =

Flatbush Avenue is a street in Brooklyn, New York.

Flatbush Avenue may also refer to:

== Stations ==
- Flatbush Avenue (BMT Fulton Street Line), in Brooklyn, New York, United States
- Flatbush Avenue–Brooklyn College (IRT Nostrand Avenue Line), in Brooklyn, New York, United States
- Flatbush Avenue (LIRR station), in Brooklyn, New York, United States
- Flatbush Avenue station (Connecticut), in West Hartford, Connecticut, United States

== Transportation routes ==
- Flatbush Avenue Connector, in Connecticut
- IRT Flatbush Avenue Line, another name for IRT Nostrand Avenue Line, in Brooklyn, New York, United States
- Flatbush Avenue Line (surface), in Brooklyn, New York, United States

== See also ==
- Flatbush Avenue Line (disambiguation)
