= Boerum Place station =

Boerum Place

General information
- Location: Fulton Street and Boerum Place; Downtown Brooklyn, Brooklyn, New York
- Coordinates: 40.692136°N 73.989034°W
- Line: BMT Fulton Street Line
- Platforms: 2 side platforms
- Tracks: 2

Construction
- Structure type: Elevated

History
- Opened: April 24, 1888; 138 years ago
- Closed: June 1, 1940; 86 years ago

Former services
Preceding station	BMT Lines	Following station
Myrtle Avenue toward Park Row or Fulton Ferry	13: Fulton Street Local	Elm Place–Duffield Street toward Lefferts Avenue
Court Street One-way operation	13: Fulton Street Local	Elm Place–Duffield Street toward Lefferts Avenue
Location

Boerum Place was a station on the demolished BMT Fulton Street Line. The Fulton Street Elevated was built by the Kings County Elevated Railway Company and this station started service on April 24, 1888. The station had 2 tracks and 1 island platform. It was served by trains of the BMT Fulton Street Line, and until 1920, trains of the BMT Brighton Line. This station was served by steam locomotives between 1888 and 1899. In 1898, the Brooklyn Rapid Transit Company (BRT) absorbed the Kings County Elevated Railway, and it took over the Fulton Street El, and it was electrified on July 3, 1899. It closed on June 1, 1940, when all service from Fulton Ferry and Park Row to Rockaway Avenue was abandoned, as it came under city ownership.
