= Flatbush Avenue station (BMT Fulton Street Line) =

Flatbush Ave.
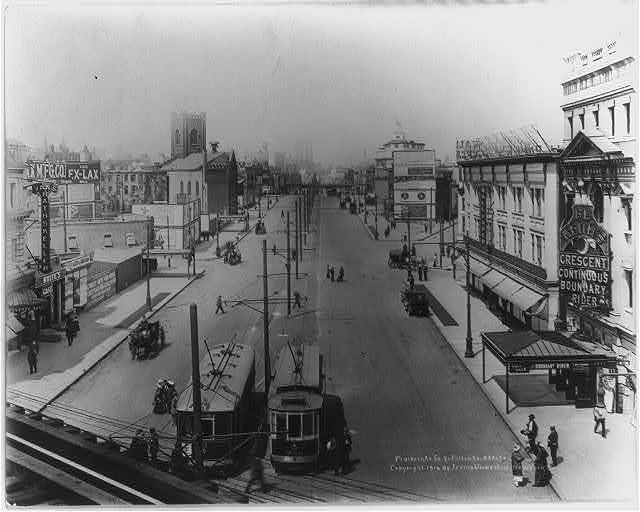
- 1914 view of Flatbush Avenue from the BMT Fulton Street Line. Note the BRT Trolleys below.

General information
- Location: Fulton Street and Flatbush Avenue; Downtown Brooklyn, Brooklyn, New York
- Coordinates: 40.688923°N 73.980950°W
- Line: BMT Fulton Street Line
- Platforms: 1 island platform
- Tracks: 2

Construction
- Structure type: Elevated

History
- Opened: April 24, 1888; 138 years ago
- Closed: June 1, 1940; 86 years ago

Former services
Preceding station	BMT Lines	Following station
Elm Place–Duffield Street toward Park Row or Fulton Ferry	13: Fulton Street Local	Lafayette Avenue toward Lefferts Avenue
Location

The Flatbush Avenue station was a station on the demolished BMT Fulton Street Line. The Fulton Street Elevated was built by the Kings County Elevated Railway Company and this station started service on April 24, 1888. The station had 2 tracks and 1 island platform. It was served by trains of the BMT Fulton Street Line, and until 1920, trains of the BMT Brighton Line. The station was located west of the BMT Fifth Avenue Line, but had no connection to that elevated line. It was also located north of the Flatbush Avenue station on the Long Island Rail Road, now known as the Atlantic Terminal, and had no connections there either.

This station was served by steam locomotives between 1888 and 1899. In 1898, the Brooklyn Rapid Transit Company (BRT) absorbed the Kings County Elevated Railway, and it took over the Fulton Street El, and it was electrified on July 3, 1899. It closed on June 1, 1940, when all service from Fulton Ferry and Park Row to Rockaway Avenue was abandoned, as it came under city ownership. Current mass transit stations available nearby are either at Nevins Street subway station on the IRT Eastern Parkway Line to the southeast, or at DeKalb Avenue subway station on the BMT Fourth Avenue and Brighton Lines to the northwest.
