= Clark Street =

Clark Street may refer to:

- Clark Street (Chicago)
- Clark Street (IRT Broadway – Seventh Avenue Line), a New York City Subway station
- Clark-Tillary Streets (BMT Fulton Street Line), a demolished station
