= Grand Avenue station (BMT Fulton Street Line) =

Grand Ave.

General information
- Location: Fulton Street and Grand Avenue; Clinton Hill, Brooklyn, New York
- Coordinates: 40.682382°N 73.979255°W
- Line: BMT Fulton Street Line
- Platforms: 2 side platforms
- Tracks: 2
- Connections: Putnam Avenue Line

Construction
- Structure type: Elevated

History
- Opened: April 24, 1888
- Closed: May 31, 1940; 86 years ago

Former services
Preceding station	BMT Lines	Following station
Vanderbilt Avenue toward Park Row or Fulton Ferry	13: Fulton Street Local	Franklin Avenue toward Lefferts Avenue
Location

The Grand Avenue station was a station on the demolished BMT Fulton Street Line in Brooklyn, New York City. It opened on April 24, 1888, and had two tracks and two offset side platforms. It was served by trains of the BMT Fulton Street Line, and until 1920, trains of the BMT Brighton Line. The station was also the easternmost station to share the original Brighton Line trains before branching off to the south at the Franklin Avenue elevated station, the site of the present-day Franklin Avenue subway station. It also had connections to Putnam Avenue Line trolleys. The next stop to the east was Franklin Avenue. The next stop to the west was Vanderbilt Avenue. In 1936, the Independent Subway System built the Fulton Street subway, but provided no station as competition. The elevated station became obsolete, and it closed on May 31, 1940.
