= Eastern Parkway station =

Eastern Parkway
- Former New York City Subway station

Station statistics
- Address: Snediker Avenue and Pitkin Avenue; Brooklyn, NY
- Borough: Brooklyn
- Locale: East New York
- Coordinates: 40.673480°N 73.902947°W
- Division: B (BMT)
- Line: BMT Canarsie Line; BMT Fulton Street Line
- Services: None
- Structure: Elevated
- Platforms: 1 side platform
- Tracks: 2

Other information
- Opened: November 18, 1889; 135 years ago
- Closed: November 17, 1918; 107 years ago

Station succession
- Next north: Atlantic Avenue
- Next south: Pennsylvania Avenue (Fulton Street); Sutter Avenue (Canarsie)
Location

Street map
Station service legend
Symbol	Description
Stops all times	Stops in station at all times
Stops all times except late nights	Stops all times except late nights
Stops late nights only	Stops late nights only
Stops late nights and weekends	Stops late nights and weekends only
Stops weekdays during the day	Stops weekdays during the day
Stops weekends during the day	Stops weekends during the day
Stops all times except rush hours in the peak direction	Stops all times except rush hours in the peak direction
Stops all times except weekdays in the peak direction	Stops all times except weekdays in the peak direction
Stops daily except rush hours in the peak direction	Stops all times except nights and rush hours in the peak direction
Stops rush hours only	Stops rush hours only
Stops rush hours in the peak direction only	Stops rush hours in the peak direction only
Station closed	Station is closed
(Details about time periods)

The Eastern Parkway station was a station on the demolished BMT Fulton Street Line in Brooklyn, New York City, at Pitkin Avenue and Snediker Avenue. It had 2 tracks and 1 island platform and was served by trains of the BMT Fulton Street Line. The station was opened on November 18, 1889, one of three other stations along the line to open on that date.

From 1875 to 1897, the present-day Pitkin Avenue was known as Eastern Parkway. The station name was not changed when the street was renamed. The next stop to the east was Pennsylvania Avenue. The next stop to the west was Atlantic Avenue, which it was in close proximity to. It was even closer to the still existing Sutter Avenue station on the BMT Canarsie Line. It closed on November 17, 1918, and was replaced by Hinsdale Street station.
