= Clinton–Washington Avenues station (IND Fulton Street Line) =

New York City Subway station in Brooklyn

Clinton–Washington Avenues
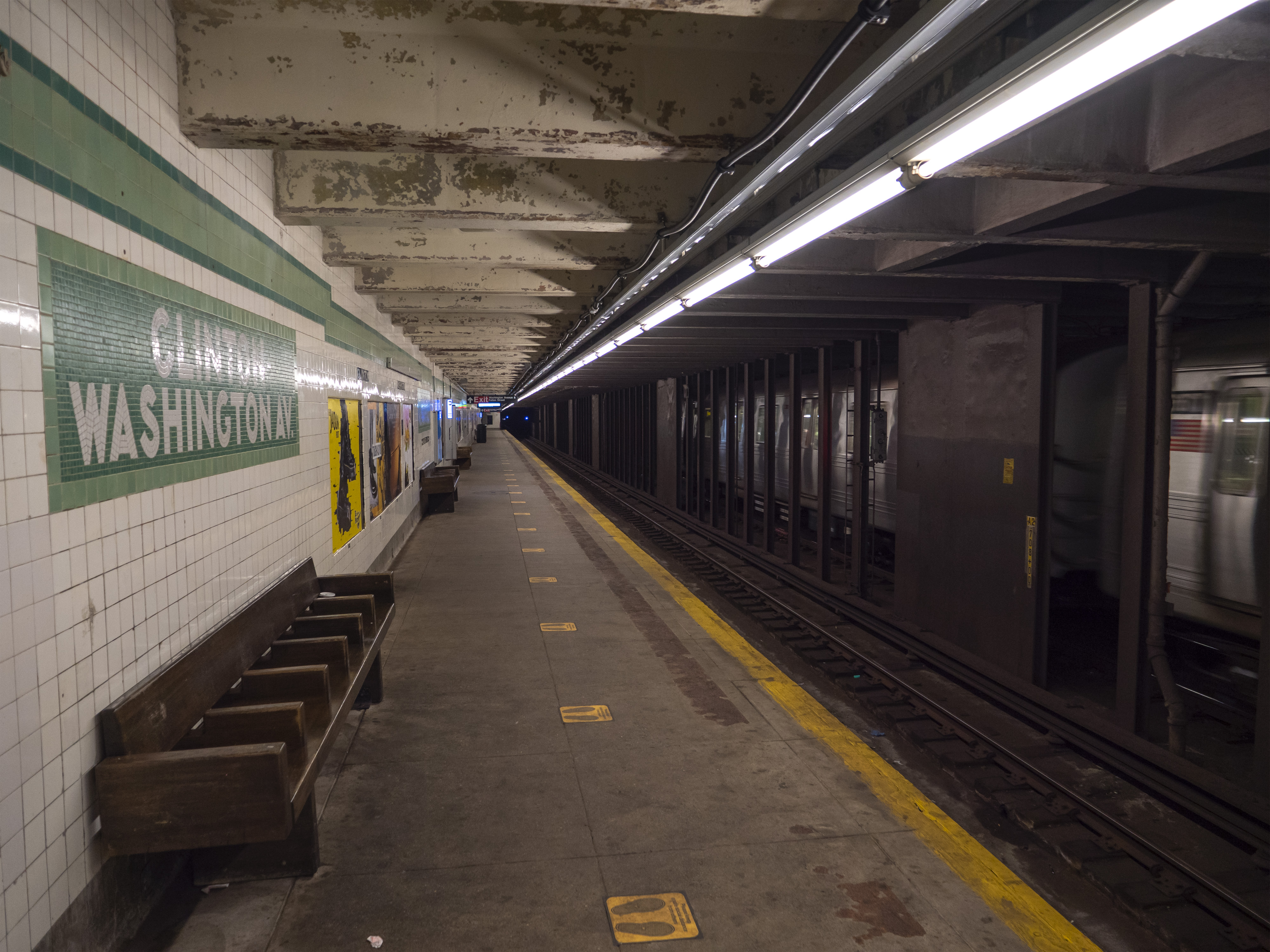
- Northbound platform with R46 A train skipping the station

Station statistics
- Address: Fulton Street between Clinton Avenue & Washington Avenue; Brooklyn, New York
- Borough: Brooklyn
- Locale: Clinton Hill
- Coordinates: 40.683176°N 73.965883°W
- Division: B (IND)
- Line: IND Fulton Street Line
- Services: A (late nights); C (all except late nights)
- Transit: NYCT Bus: B25, B26, B69
- Structure: Underground
- Platforms: 2 side platforms
- Tracks: 4

Other information
- Opened: April 9, 1936; 90 years ago

Traffic
- 2025: 1,878,634 ▲9.8%
- Rank: 187 out of 423
Services
Preceding station	New York City Subway	Following station
Lafayette Avenue A C toward 168th Street	Local	Franklin Avenue A C toward Euclid Avenue
Location
Location within New York City Subway
Location within New York City
Location within New York
Track layout
Street map
Station service legend
Symbol	Description
Stops all times except late nights	Stops all times except late nights
Stops late nights only	Stops late nights only

The Clinton–Washington Avenues station is a local station on the IND Fulton Street Line of the New York City Subway. Located on Fulton Street between Clinton Avenue and Washington Avenue, it is served by the C train at all times except late nights, when the A train takes over service.

== History ==
This underground station opened on April 9, 1936, and replaced the BMT Fulton Street El. The Vanderbilt Avenue El station, which was formerly near the current subway station, closed on May 31, 1940.

Under the 2015–2019 Metropolitan Transportation Authority Capital Program, the station, along with thirty other New York City Subway stations, would have undergone a complete overhaul and be entirely closed for up to 6 months. Updates would include cellular service, Wi-Fi, charging stations, improved signage, and improved station lighting. However, these renovations are being deferred until the 2020–2024 Capital Program due to a lack of funding.

== Station layout ==
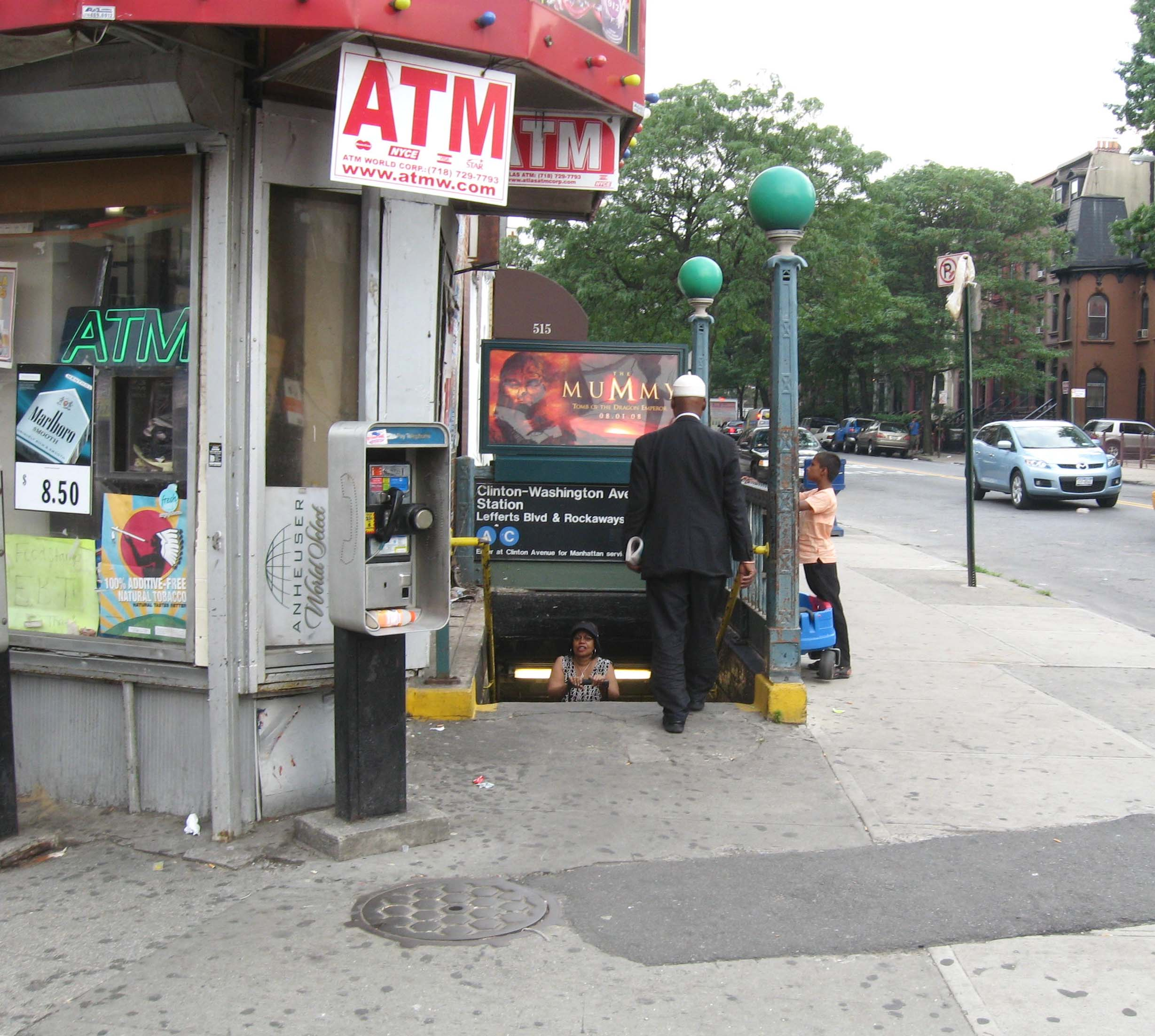
Southbound street stair

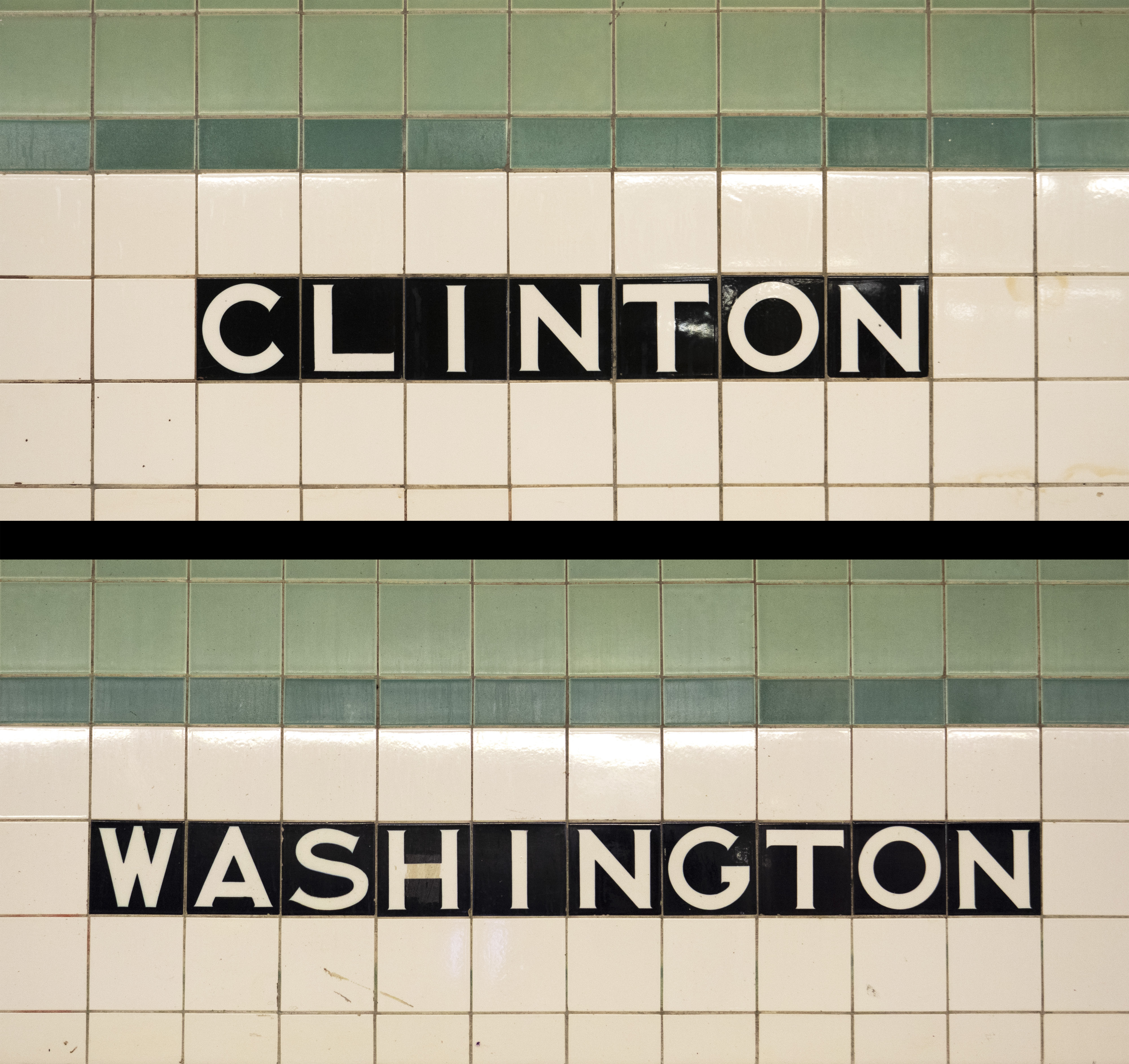
Tile captions

This station has four tracks, consisting of two outer tracks with side platforms and two inner tracks for express service. There is no mezzanine, and no crossovers or crossunders to allow free transfers between directions.

Both platform walls have a light green trim line with a dark green border, and mosaic name tablets reading "CLINTON – WASHINGTON AV." in white sans-serif lettering broken into two lines on a dark green background and light green border. Small tile captions alternating between "CLINTON" and "WASHINGTON" in white lettering on a black background run below the trim line, and directional signs in the same style are below some of the name tablets. The platforms are column-less except at the fare control areas, where they are painted emerald green.

=== Exits ===
Each platform has same-level exits on both ends. The east (railroad south) exits each have a turnstile bank and one staircase to the eastern side of Washington Avenue, while the west (railroad north) exits each have a turnstile bank and staircases to both sides of Clinton Avenue. The west exit on the Manhattan-bound platform also has a full-time token booth.

== In popular culture ==
The station's entrance was featured in The Notorious B.I.G.'s music video for the song "Juicy." It is also the place of a fight scene in the movie Limitless.
