= Cumberland Avenue station =

Cumberland Avenue station may refer to:

- Cumberland Avenue station (Tampa), a streetcar station
- Cumberland Avenue station (BMT Fulton Street Line), a demolished elevated station in New York City
