= Richmond Road (Staten Island) =

Street in Staten Island, New York

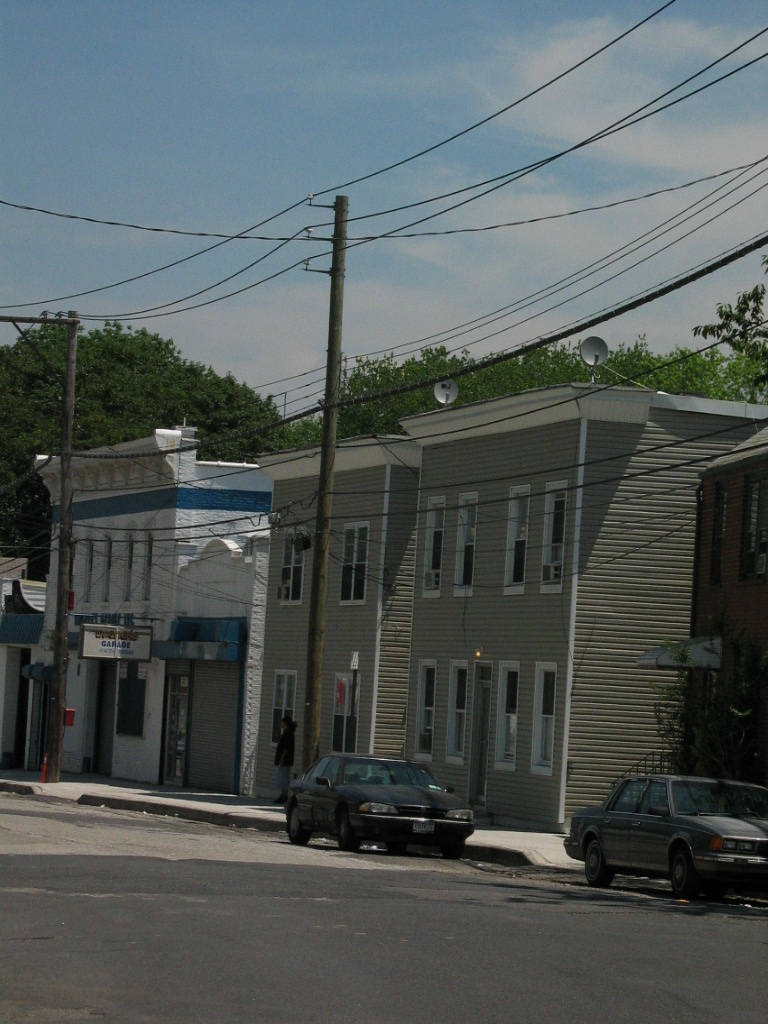
- Richmond Road near Targee Street
- Owner: City of New York
- Maintained by: NYCDOT
- Length: 4.93 mi (7.93 km)
- Location: Staten Island, New York
- Coordinates: 40°35′5.85″N 74°6′23.02″W
- South end: Arthur Kill Road in Richmondtown
- Major junctions: I-278 in Concord
- North end: Vanderbilt Avenue in Park Hill

Richmond Road is a major north-south artery along the East Shore of the New York City borough of Staten Island. It is approximately 4.93 miles (7.93 km) long, and runs through the neighborhoods of Concord, Grymes Hill, Emerson Hill, Grasmere, Old Town, Dongan Hills, Grant City, Todt Hill, New Dorp, Egbertville, Lighthouse Hill, and Richmondtown.

== Route description ==
Parts of Richmond Road along with all of Vanderbilt Avenue and all of Amboy Road form Staten Island's colonial-era eastern corridor that predates the newer, straighter, and wider Hylan Boulevard. The three roads that make up the corridor share a common numbering system, i.e. Richmond Road's numbers start where Vanderbilt Avenue's leave off and Amboy Road's numbers start where Amboy Road forks away from Richmond Road. This numbering system includes the numerically highest of street addresses in New York City.

Other roads that fork off of the Richmond Road corridor are St. Paul's Avenue, Van Duzer Street, Targee Street, Rockland Avenue, Bloomingdale Road, Pleasant Plains Avenue, and Richmond Valley Road.

== Transportation ==
Richmond Road is served by the following bus routes:

- The S74 and S84 serves the road in its entirety, with the S76 and S86 north of New Dorp Lane and the SIM15 on two portions: between Narrows and Amboy Roads and south of Wilder Avenue. Where Richmond Road is one way southbound, northbound buses use the parallel Targee Street.
- The S54 runs south of Rockland Avenue, and the S57 runs north of Rockland until Amboy Road, via the New Dorp station from Rose Avenue to New Dorp Lane.
- The St. George Ferry-bound S51 runs to Midland Avenue from Lincoln Avenue, where the route originates. The S81 just terminates at Lincoln in Grant City due to running only southbound.

== History ==
Richmond Road dates back to the early 1700s, laid out as part of the "Public Common General Road", and was likely a Native American footpath prior to that.

== Major intersections ==
The entire route is in the New York City borough of Staten Island.

Location	mi	km	Destinations	Notes
Richmondtown	0.00	0.00	Arthur Kill Road south / Richmond Hill Road west	
New Dorp	1.45	2.33	Amboy Road south	
Todt Hill	3.86	6.21	Targee Street	Southern terminus of one-way segment
Concord–Park Hill line	4.59	7.39	I-278 (Staten Island Expressway) – Goethals Bridge, Verrazano Bridge	Exit 13A on I-278; access via Narrows Road
Park Hill	4.93	7.93	Van Duzer Street / Vanderbilt Avenue	
1.000 mi = 1.609 km; 1.000 km = 0.621 mi
