= Vanderbilt Avenue station (BMT Fulton Street Line) =

Vanderbilt Ave.

General information
- Location: Fulton Street and Vanderbilt Avenue; Clinton Hill, Brooklyn, New York
- Coordinates: 40.683793°N 73.967987°W
- Line: BMT Fulton Street Line
- Platforms: 2 side platforms
- Tracks: 2
- Connections: Vanderbilt Avenue Line

Construction
- Structure type: Elevated

History
- Opened: April 24, 1888; 138 years ago
- Closed: June 1, 1940; 86 years ago

Former services
| Preceding station | BMT Lines | Following station |
|---|---|---|
| Cumberland Avenue toward Park Row or Fulton Ferry | 13: Fulton Street Local | Grand Avenue toward Lefferts Avenue |
Location

Vanderbilt Avenue was a station on the demolished BMT Fulton Street Line. The Fulton Street Elevated was built by the Kings County Elevated Railway Company and this station started service on April 24, 1888. The station had 2 tracks and 2 side platforms. It was served by trains of the BMT Fulton Street Line, and until 1920, trains of the BMT Brighton Line. This station was served by steam locomotives between 1888 and 1899. In 1898, the Brooklyn Rapid Transit Company (BRT) absorbed the Kings County Elevated Railway, and it took over the Fulton Street El, and it was electrified on July 3, 1899. It also had a connection to the streetcar line of the same name. In 1936, the Independent Subway System built the Fulton Street subway and added a station one block to the southeast named Clinton–Washington Avenues. The elevated station became obsolete, and it closed on June 1, 1940, when all service from Fulton Ferry and Park Row to Rockaway Avenue was abandoned, as it came under city ownership.
