= Navy Street station =

Navy Street
- Former New York City Subway station

Station statistics
- Address: Myrtle Avenue and Navy Street; Brooklyn, NY 11201
- Borough: Brooklyn
- Locale: Fort Greene
- Coordinates: 40.693509°N 73.979176°W
- Division: B (BMT)
- Services: BMT Myrtle Avenue Line
- Structure: Elevated
- Platforms: 1 island platform
- Tracks: 2

Other information
- Opened: April 10, 1888; 137 years ago
- Closed: October 4, 1969; 56 years ago

Station succession
- Next west: Bridge–Jay Streets
- Next east: Vanderbilt Avenue
Location

Street map
Station service legend
Symbol	Description
Stops all times	Stops in station at all times
Stops all times except late nights	Stops all times except late nights
Stops late nights only	Stops late nights only
Stops late nights and weekends	Stops late nights and weekends only
Stops weekdays during the day	Stops weekdays during the day
Stops weekends during the day	Stops weekends during the day
Stops all times except rush hours in the peak direction	Stops all times except rush hours in the peak direction
Stops all times except weekdays in the peak direction	Stops all times except weekdays in the peak direction
Stops daily except rush hours in the peak direction	Stops all times except nights and rush hours in the peak direction
Stops rush hours only	Stops rush hours only
Stops rush hours in the peak direction only	Stops rush hours in the peak direction only
Station closed	Station is closed
(Details about time periods)

The Navy Street station was a station on the demolished BMT Myrtle Avenue Line in Brooklyn, New York City. It had 2 tracks and 1 island platform. The station opened on April 10, 1888 for the Myrtle Avenue Elevated trains. In 1891, the station also began serving Lexington Avenue Elevated trains by 1891. A segment of the Lexington Avenue Line once turned north from here onto Hudson Avenue and York Street on its way to the Fulton Ferry until 1904, when Lexington and Fifth Avenue trains were redirected along Myrtle Avenue west of this station. It closed on October 4, 1969, after a fire on the elevated structure. The next stop to the north was Vanderbilt Avenue. The next stop to the south was Bridge–Jay Streets.
