= Pennsylvania Avenue station (BMT Fulton Street Line) =

Pennsylvania Avenue
- Former New York City Subway station

Station statistics
- Address: Pitkin Avenue and Pennsylvania Avenue; Brooklyn, NY 11207
- Borough: Brooklyn
- Locale: East New York
- Coordinates: 40.671904°N 73.895861°W
- Division: B (BMT)
- Line: BMT Fulton Street Line
- Services: None
- Structure: Elevated
- Platforms: 1 island platform
- Tracks: 2

Other information
- Opened: November 18, 1889; 135 years ago
- Closed: April 26, 1956; 69 years ago

Station succession
- Next west: Eastern Parkway (1889–1918); Hinsdale Street (1918–1956)
- Next east: Van Siclen Avenue
Location

Street map
Station service legend
Symbol	Description
Stops all times	Stops in station at all times
Stops all times except late nights	Stops all times except late nights
Stops late nights only	Stops late nights only
Stops late nights and weekends	Stops late nights and weekends only
Stops weekdays during the day	Stops weekdays during the day
Stops weekends during the day	Stops weekends during the day
Stops all times except rush hours in the peak direction	Stops all times except rush hours in the peak direction
Stops all times except weekdays in the peak direction	Stops all times except weekdays in the peak direction
Stops daily except rush hours in the peak direction	Stops all times except nights and rush hours in the peak direction
Stops rush hours only	Stops rush hours only
Stops rush hours in the peak direction only	Stops rush hours in the peak direction only
Station closed	Station is closed
(Details about time periods)

The Pennsylvania Avenue station was a station on the demolished BMT Fulton Street Line in Brooklyn, New York City. It had 2 tracks and 1 island platform, and was served by trains of the BMT Fulton Street Line. The station was opened on November 18, 1889, one of three other stations to do so. The next stop to the east was Van Siclen Avenue. The next stop to the west was Eastern Parkway, until 1918, when it was replaced by Hinsdale Street.

On November 28, 1948, the Independent Subway System built the underground Liberty Avenue Subway station two blocks north after years of war-time construction delays. This station rendered the elevated station obsolete, and it closed on April 26, 1956.
