= Amboy Road =

Street in Staten Island, New York

Coordinates: 40°32′5.47″N 74°11′2.96″W

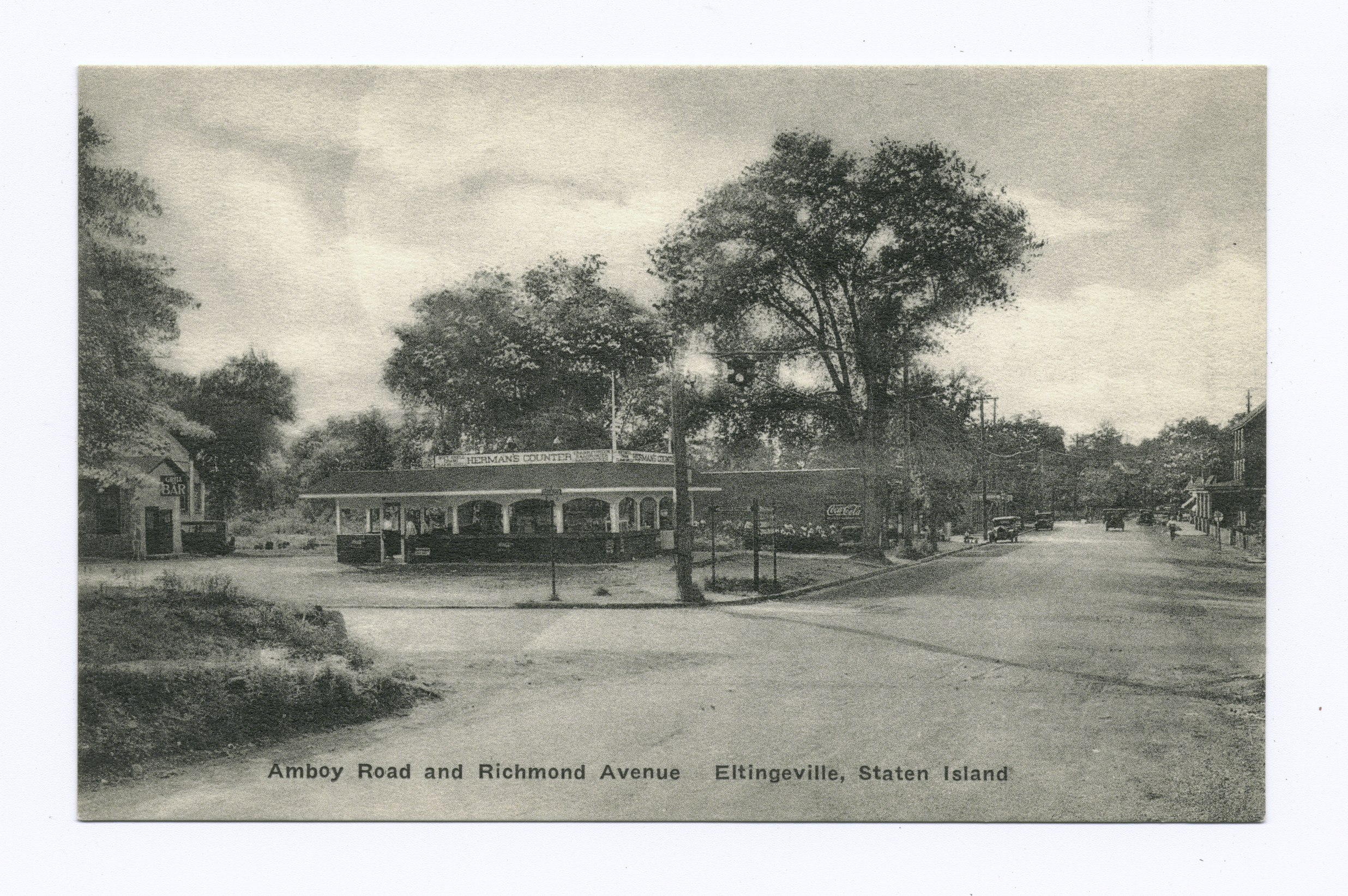
- Amboy Road and Richmond Avenue, Eltingville, Ca 1900
- Length: 9.1 mi (14.6 km)
- Location: Richmond
- North end: Richmond Road
- South end: Wards Point Avenue

Amboy Road is a major north-south artery along the South-East Shore of the New York City borough of Staten Island. It is approximately 9.1 miles (14.6 km) long.

== Description ==
Amboy Rd. was originally part of an extensive Native American trail system used by Algonquian peoples during prehistoric times. Along with parts of Richmond Road and all of Vanderbilt Avenue, Amboy Road forms the last leg of Staten Island's colonial-era eastern corridor that predates the newer, straighter, and wider Hylan Boulevard. The three roads that make up the corridor share a common numbering system, i.e. Richmond Road's numbers start where Vanderbilt Avenue's leave off and Amboy Road's numbers start where Amboy Road forks away from Richmond Road. This numbering system includes the numerically highest of street addresses in New York City. Other roads that fork off of this corridor are: St. Paul's Avenue, Van Duzer Street, Targee Street, Rockland Avenue, Bloomingdale Road, and Richmond Valley Road. Amboy Road also runs within blocks of the Staten Island Railway for the majority of its length.

== Transportation ==
Amboy Road is covered by the following bus routes:

- The SIM15 express bus and S57 local bus serve Amboy north of Guyon and Clarke Avenues, respectively.
- The SIM26 express bus and Bricktown Mall-bound S78 local bus serve Amboy south of Bloomingdale Road and Johnson Avenue, respectively.
- Additional weekday service is provided by the following:
  - The S55 runs between Annadale and Bloomingdale Roads, but is absent between Luten and Seguine Avenues to provide additional service on Hylan Boulevard.
  - The Tottenville-bound S59 runs from Craig Avenue to Main Street.
