= Flatbush Avenue Line =

Flatbush Avenue Line may refer to the following transit lines in Brooklyn, New York:

- IRT Flatbush Avenue Line, another name for the IRT Nostrand Avenue Line, a rapid transit line ending at Flatbush Avenue – Brooklyn College
- Flatbush Avenue Line (surface), running along Flatbush Avenue between Downtown Brooklyn and Marine Park; originally a streetcar line, now a bus route
