= Sutter Avenue station =

New York City Subway station in Brooklyn

Sutter Avenue
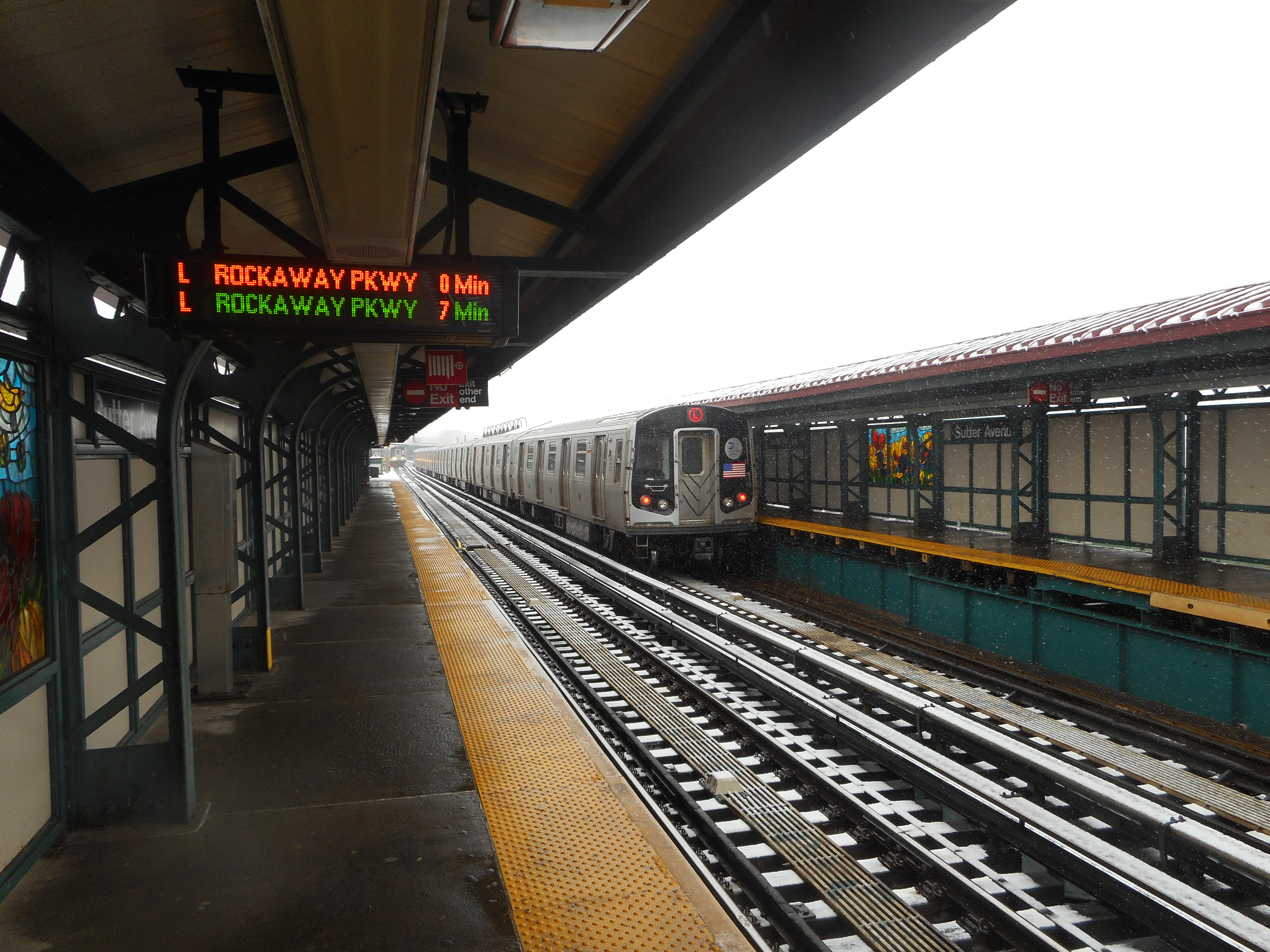

Station statistics
- Address: Sutter Avenue & Van Sinderen Avenue; Brooklyn, New York
- Borough: Brooklyn
- Locale: Brownsville, East New York
- Coordinates: 40.668367°N 73.901768°W
- Division: B (BMT)
- Line: BMT Canarsie Line
- Services: L (all times)
- Transit: NYCT Bus: B14
- Structure: Elevated
- Platforms: 2 side platforms
- Tracks: 2

Other information
- Opened: July 28, 1906; 120 years ago

Traffic
- 2025: 635,155 ▲20.3%
- Rank: 365 out of 423
Services
Preceding station	New York City Subway	Following station
Atlantic Avenue toward Eighth Avenue	L (New York City Subway service)	Livonia Avenue toward Canarsie–Rockaway Parkway
Location
Location within New York City Subway
Location within New York City
Location within New York
Track layout
Street map
Station service legend
Symbol	Description
Stops all times	Stops all times

The Sutter Avenue station is a station on the BMT Canarsie Line of the New York City Subway. Located at the intersection of Van Sinderen and Sutter Avenues at the border of Brownsville and East New York, Brooklyn, it is served by the L train at all times. It opened in 1906 and was renovated in 2006.

== History ==
This station opened on July 28, 1906.

It was renovated in 2006, which included new windscreens (beige with green frames) and canopies (red with green frames) that run along the entire length of the platforms except for a small section at the north end and installation of yellow tactile warning strips on the edges. Artwork called The Habitat for the Yellow Bird by Takayo Noda was also installed and features stained glass windows of flowers on the windscreens. The renovation cost $12.56 million.

== Station layout ==
This elevated station has two tracks and two side platforms. The station is a microcosm of early-20th century BRT construction. Ornate period ironwork adorns the quaint wooden crosswalk beneath the south end of the station.

=== Exit ===
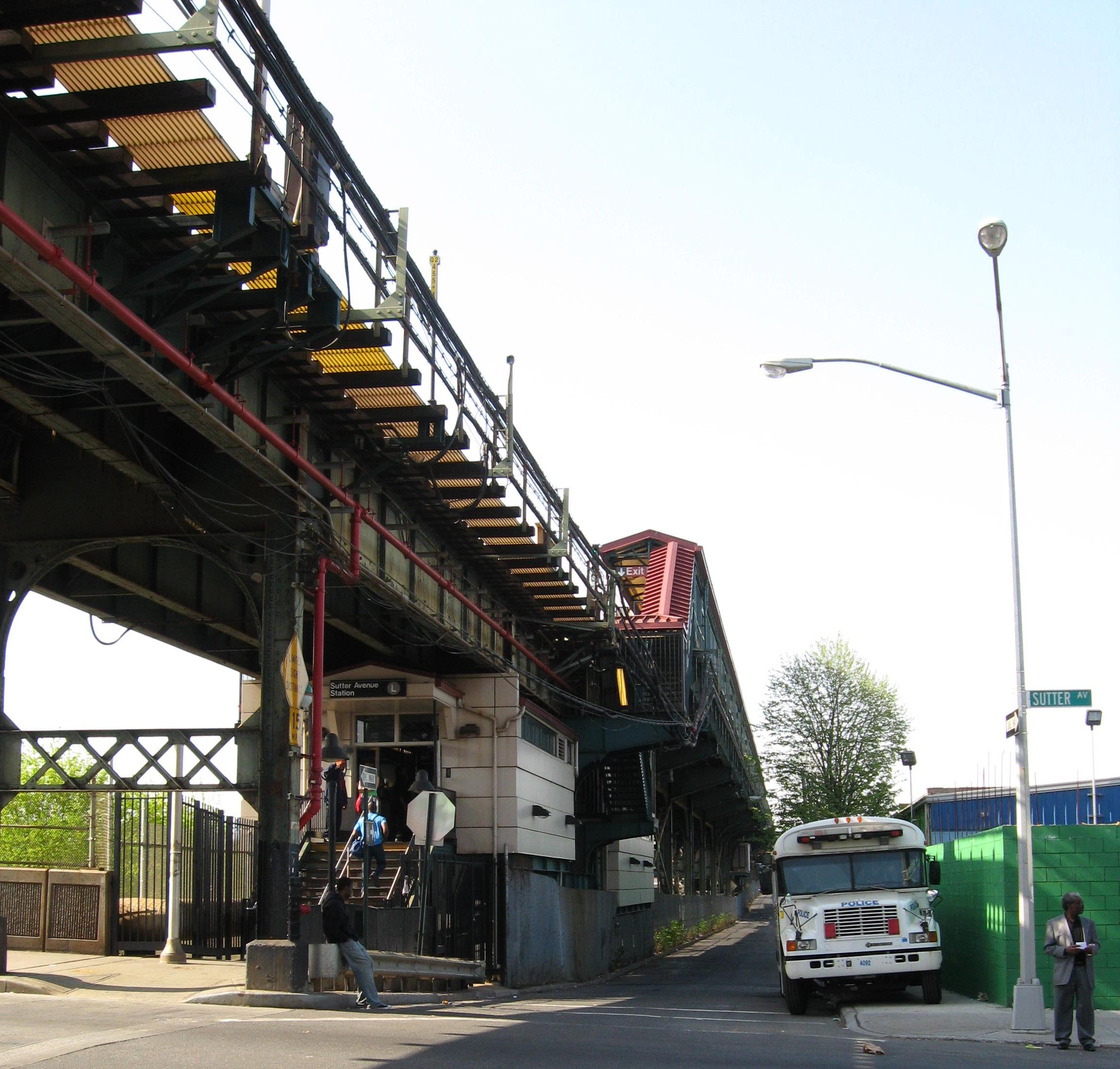
Eastern street stair

The only entrance is via a ground level station house underneath the tracks on the northwest corner of Sutter and Van Sinderen Avenues. Inside is a token booth, turnstile bank, and a single canopied staircase to each platform at their extreme south ends.

The station once had a second entrance north of the open entrance. The entrance was accessed through a now-demolished pedestrian bridge over the Bay Ridge Branch right of way, which led to both eastern corners of Belmont Avenue and Van Sinderen Avenue to the east of the right of way, as well as both western corners of Belmont Avenue and Junius Street to the west of the right of way. The pedestrian bridge was demolished between 1980 and 1988, and the remnants of the entrance were repurposed into equipment rooms and emergency exits.

== Structure changes north of the station ==
North of this station, the Canarsie Line formerly split into two separate elevated structures, one above Van Sinderen Avenue and another a block east above Snediker Avenue via an "S" curve. This curve into was one of the sharpest in the subway at around 75 degrees. As the curve swung eastward, it passed under the last remnant of the Fulton Street Elevated. The tracks on this line curved east on their way to City Line, Brooklyn before ending at Pitkin Avenue. The two Canarsie elevated structures ran north into separate platforms at Atlantic Avenue.

After the Fulton Street Elevated was closed in 1956, the Canarsie Line continued using the tracks it always had and the rest of the structure fell into disuse. In 2002–2004, the portion above Snediker Avenue was abandoned and the northbound Canarsie Line track was re-routed to share the westernmost island platform with southbound Canarsie Line service there. Demolition of the unused elevated structure began in 2003 and was completed in 2005. Now, northbound L trains have a much gentler curve to the west.
