= Lafayette Avenue station (IND Fulton Street Line) =

New York City Subway station in Brooklyn

Lafayette Avenue
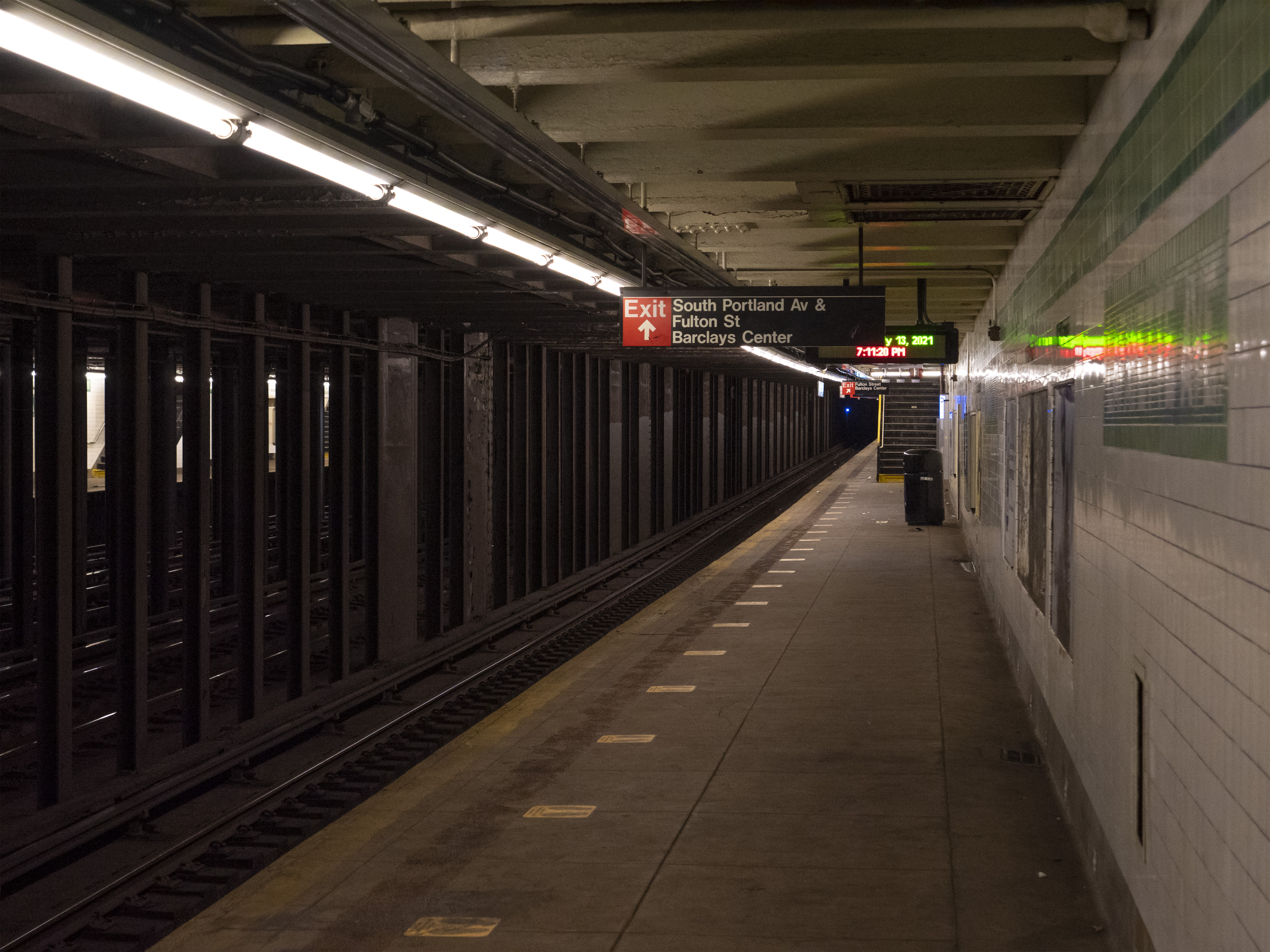
- Southbound platform

Station statistics
- Address: South Portland Avenue & Fulton Street; Brooklyn, New York (main station entrance)
- Borough: Brooklyn
- Locale: Fort Greene
- Coordinates: 40.686268°N 73.974466°W
- Division: B (IND)
- Line: IND Fulton Street Line
- Services: A (late nights); C (all except late nights)
- Transit: NYCT Bus: B25, B26, B52
- Structure: Underground
- Platforms: 2 side platforms
- Tracks: 4

Other information
- Opened: April 9, 1936; 90 years ago

Traffic
- 2025: 1,374,887 ▲0.7%
- Rank: 243 out of 423
Services
Preceding station	New York City Subway	Following station
Hoyt–Schermerhorn Streets A C toward 168th Street	Local	Clinton–Washington Avenues A C toward Euclid Avenue
Location
Location within New York City Subway
Location within New York City
Location within New York
Track layout
Street map
Station service legend
Symbol	Description
Stops all times except late nights	Stops all times except late nights
Stops late nights only	Stops late nights only

The Lafayette Avenue station is a local station on the IND Fulton Street Line of the New York City Subway. Located under Lafayette Avenue and Fulton Street in Brooklyn, it is served by the C train at all times except late nights, when the A train takes over service.

Despite the station's name, there are no entrances on Lafayette Avenue; the nearest entrance is a block away.

== History ==
This underground station opened on April 9, 1936, and replaced the BMT Fulton Street El. The Lafayette Avenue El station, which was formerly above the current subway station, closed on May 31, 1940.

== Station layout ==
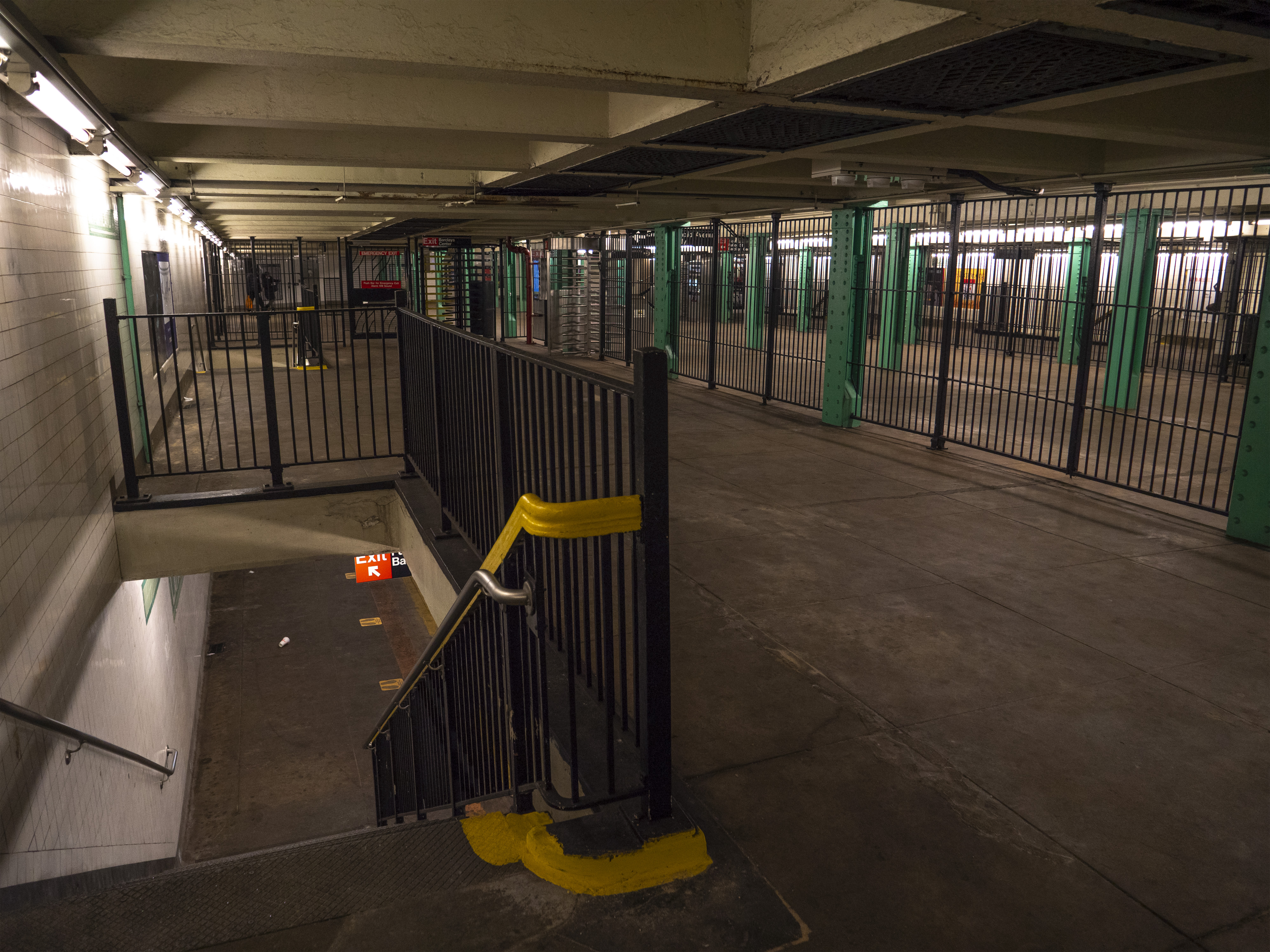
Mezzanine level

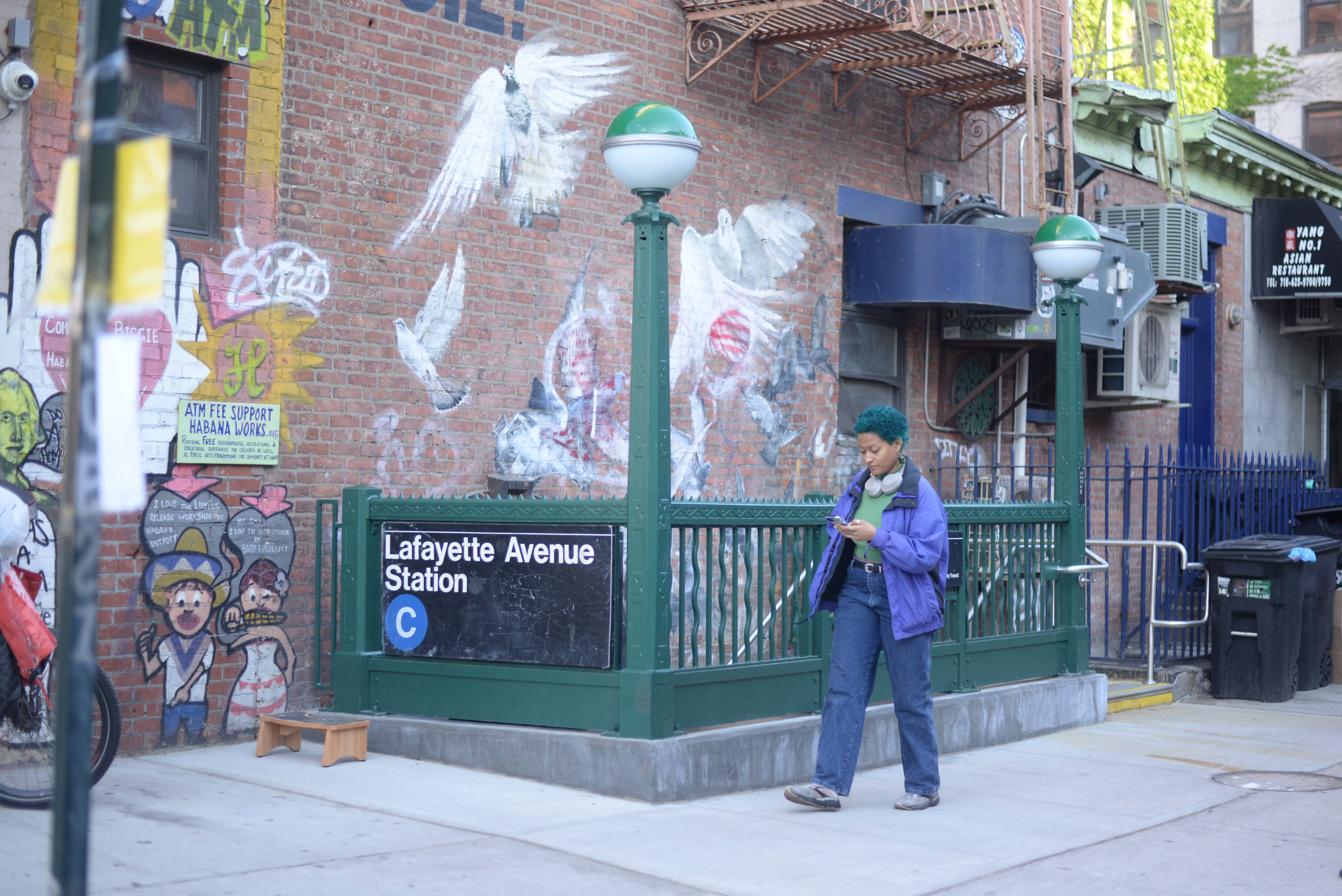
Entrance at the southeast corner of Fulton St and S Portland Ave.

This station has four tracks and two side platforms. Both platforms have stairs that lead up to a long mezzanine and fare control. There is no free crossover or crossunder between the two platforms, due to the shape of the mezzanine's fare control area.

Both platform walls have a light green trim line with a dark green border and mosaic name tablets reading "LAFAYETTE AVE." in white sans-serif lettering on a dark green background with light green border. Small tile captions reading "LAFAYETTE" in white lettering on a black background run below the trim line. Emerald green I-beam columns run along the station mezzanine, but none are present at platform level.

East of this station is a storage/lay up track between the two express tracks. The west end connects to the northbound express track, and the east end connects to the southbound express track, so trains must reverse in order to enter the layup track. At both ends, the storage/lay up track also ends at bumper blocks. There are also switches in both directions from the respective local to the respective express tracks; however, express trains cannot switch to the local tracks at these switches.

The station is located very close to the Fulton Street station on the IND Crosstown Line. Passengers on northbound local trains can see the platforms of the station on the right just after leaving Lafayette Avenue, as well as the Crosstown Line's northbound track through openings in the curtain walls. There is an employee-only connection between the two stations via the subway tunnels.

=== Exits ===
All exits serve both platforms. At the west end, there are stairs to all four corners of Fulton Street and South Portland Avenue. At the east end, there are stairs to four out of the six corners of the intersection of Fulton Street, South Oxford Street, and Hanson Place. There are two stairs to the northern corner, one to the northeastern (via a passageway), one to the southeastern, and one to the southwestern.

== Nearby points of interest ==
- Barclays Center
- Brooklyn Academy of Music
- Brooklyn Technical High School
- Fort Greene Park
- Irondale Center
- Mark Morris Dance Center
- MoCADA
