= Lafayette Avenue station (BMT Fulton Street Line) =

Lafayette Ave.

General information
- Location: Fulton Street and Lafayette Avenue; Fort Greene, Brooklyn, New York
- Coordinates: 40.678848°N 73.973378°W
- Line: BMT Fulton Street Line
- Platforms: 1 island platform
- Tracks: 2

Construction
- Structure type: Elevated

History
- Opened: April 24, 1888; 138 years ago
- Closed: June 1, 1940; 86 years ago

Former services
| Preceding station | BMT Lines | Following station |
|---|---|---|
| Flatbush Avenue toward Park Row or Fulton Ferry | 13: Fulton Street Local | Cumberland Avenue toward Lefferts Avenue |
Location

Lafayette Avenue was a station on the demolished BMT Fulton Street Line. The Fulton Street Elevated was built by the Kings County Elevated Railway Company and this station started service on April 24, 1888. The station had 2 tracks and 1 island platform. It was served by trains of the BMT Fulton Street Line, and until 1920, trains of the BMT Brighton Line. The station was located east of the BMT Fifth Avenue Line, but had no connection to that elevated line. It was also located north of the Flatbush Avenue station of the Long Island Rail Road, now known as the Atlantic Terminal, and had no connections there either.

This station was served by steam locomotives between 1888 and 1899. In 1898, the Brooklyn Rapid Transit Company (BRT) absorbed the Kings County Elevated Railway, and it took over the Fulton Street El, and it was electrified on July 3, 1899. It closed on June 1, 1940, when all service from Fulton Ferry and Park Row to Rockaway Avenue was abandoned, as it came under city ownership. Though the Fulton Street subway became the replacement for the Fulton Street Elevated, the closest station to the site of Lafayette Avenue station is actually Fulton Street station on the IND Crosstown Line.
