= Vanderbilt Avenue station (BMT Myrtle Avenue Line) =

Vanderbilt Avenue
- Former New York City Subway station

Station statistics
- Address: Myrtle Avenue and Vanderbilt Avenue; Brooklyn, NY 11205
- Borough: Brooklyn
- Locale: Clinton Hill
- Coordinates: 40.693138°N 73.969847°W
- Division: B (BMT)
- Services: BMT Myrtle Avenue Line
- Structure: Elevated
- Platforms: 1 island platform
- Tracks: 2

Other information
- Opened: April 10, 1888; 137 years ago
- Closed: October 4, 1969; 56 years ago

Station succession
- Next west: Navy Street
- Next east: Washington Avenue
Location

Street map
Station service legend
Symbol	Description
Stops all times	Stops in station at all times
Stops all times except late nights	Stops all times except late nights
Stops late nights only	Stops late nights only
Stops late nights and weekends	Stops late nights and weekends only
Stops weekdays during the day	Stops weekdays during the day
Stops weekends during the day	Stops weekends during the day
Stops all times except rush hours in the peak direction	Stops all times except rush hours in the peak direction
Stops all times except weekdays in the peak direction	Stops all times except weekdays in the peak direction
Stops daily except rush hours in the peak direction	Stops all times except nights and rush hours in the peak direction
Stops rush hours only	Stops rush hours only
Stops rush hours in the peak direction only	Stops rush hours in the peak direction only
Station closed	Station is closed
(Details about time periods)

The Vanderbilt Avenue station was a station on the now-demolished BMT Myrtle Avenue Line in Brooklyn, New York City. It had two tracks and one island platform. It closed on October 4, 1969, along with the rest of the elevated structure, after a fire. The next stop to the north was Washington Avenue, and to the south was Navy Street.
