= Atlantic Avenue station (BMT Canarsie Line) =

New York City Subway station in Brooklyn

Atlantic Avenue
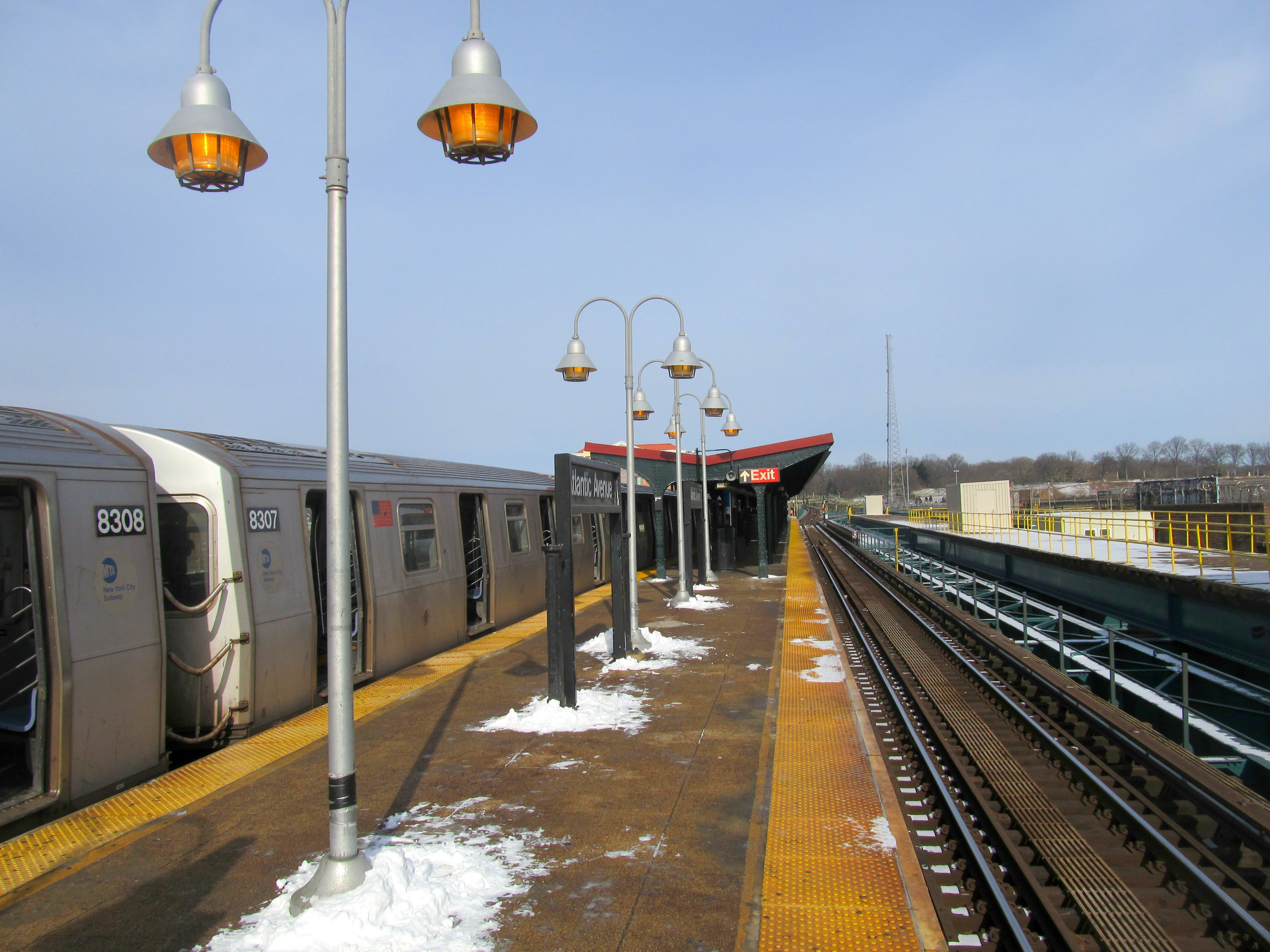
- Canarsie-bound L train at the station in 2017

Station statistics
- Address: Atlantic Avenue & Snediker Avenue; Brooklyn, New York
- Borough: Brooklyn
- Locale: East New York
- Coordinates: 40.675724°N 73.902969°W
- Division: B (BMT)
- Line: BMT Canarsie Line; BMT Fulton Street Line (formerly)
- Services: L (all times)
- Transit: NYCT Bus: B12; LIRR East New York station
- Structure: Elevated
- Platforms: 1 island platform (in service), 1 island platform (abandoned)
- Tracks: 2

Other information
- Opened: July 4, 1889; 137 years ago (Fulton Street Line); July 28, 1906; 120 years ago (Canarsie Line)
- Rebuilt: 1916; 110 years ago (Dual Contracts); 2004; 22 years ago (CBTC)
- Former/other names: Atlantic Avenue – East New York Avenue

Traffic
- 2025: 568,073 ▲48%
- Rank: 381 out of 423
Services
| Preceding station | New York City Subway | Following station |
|---|---|---|
| Broadway Junction toward Eighth Avenue | L (New York City Subway service) | Sutter Avenue toward Canarsie–Rockaway Parkway |
Non-revenue services and lines
| Preceding station | New York City Subway | Following station |
|---|---|---|
| Broadway Junction Jamaica | no service | Eastern Parkway Fulton St; demolished; original |
| Manhattan Junction Fulton St; demolished | no service | Hinsdale Street Fulton St; demolished; replacement |
Location
Location within New York City Subway
Location within New York City
Location within New York
Track layout
Street map
Station service legend
| Symbol | Description |
| Stops all times | Stops all times |

The Atlantic Avenue station is a rapid transit station on the BMT Canarsie Line of the New York City Subway. Located at the intersection of Atlantic and Snediker Avenues at East New York, Brooklyn, it is served by the L train at all times.

== History ==
Atlantic Avenue opened July 4, 1889, for the BMT Fulton Street Line portion and on July 28, 1906, for the BMT Canarsie Line portion. The Fulton Street Line platforms closed April 26, 1956. It was rebuilt in 1916, and was also reconfigured in 2002–2004. This station is one of the most well-preserved examples of the Dual Contracts architecture, as much of the period woodwork and ironwork is intact. The fare control area was modernized with new lighting and high, rounded windows. The stop lies directly above the Long Island Rail Road's East New York station, which is located in the median of Atlantic Avenue.

=== Dual Contracts rebuild ===
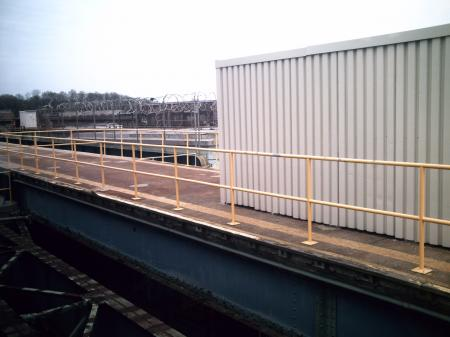
Unused Dual Contracts-era eastern platforms

Rebuilt and reconfigured under the Dual Contracts in 1916, this station had three island platforms, with six tracks. The two western island platforms resembled a typical four track express station and the other island platform was a block to the east over Snediker Avenue. The tracks and platforms were as follows west to east, southbound Canarsie line track, island platform, southbound Fulton Street el track, bi-directional Fulton Street express el track, island platform, northbound Fulton Street el track; northbound Canarsie line track, island platform, northbound Fulton Street el to Jamaica line track. The southbound Fulton Street el track could also be used by trains from the Jamaica line bound for the Canarsie line. During the station's service to both the Fulton Street el and Canarsie line, it was in this configuration. The next stop to the west on the Fulton Street Elevated was Manhattan Junction. The next stop to the east was Eastern Parkway, and later Hinsdale Street.

== Current layout ==
After the remaining portion of the Fulton Street el was removed in 1956, the Canarsie line continued to use the westernmost track and platform southbound, and the second track from the east and platform (over Snediker Avenue) northbound. The easternmost track was removed, leaving five in place.

The westernmost platform is now the only one in service with both tracks in use. The former southbound Fulton el track is now the northbound track, and was connected to the existing Canarsie Line north of Sutter Avenue station in 2003. Connecting the northbound Canarsie line to this track eliminated the sharp curve onto the structure over Snediker Avenue. The center of the three platforms is still there, but is retained only as a storage area. The easternmost platform was closed to train service in September 2003 and has been demolished except for a small portion that remained intact. The other structures relating to that platform, including the last remnants of the Fulton el, as well as the portion of the el over Snediker Avenue were demolished between September 2003 and February 2004.

North of the station, a single track diverges northeast to East New York Yard, two tracks proceed to Broadway Junction, and two others connect to the Jamaica Line. These last two are not used for regular revenue service. The station was renovated in 2015–2016.

=== Exits ===
The station's only exit point is through the mezzanine. Two conjoined stairways lead from opposite ends of the north portion of the mezzanine, meeting in a combined landing before splitting off into two small stairs to the southeast corner of Atlantic Avenue and East New York Avenue. Another stair, leading from the portion of the mezzanine that is underneath the easternmost platform, leads down to the southwest corner of Atlantic and Snediker Avenues.
