= 13 (BMT rapid transit service) =

Former New York City Subway service (ceased 1956)

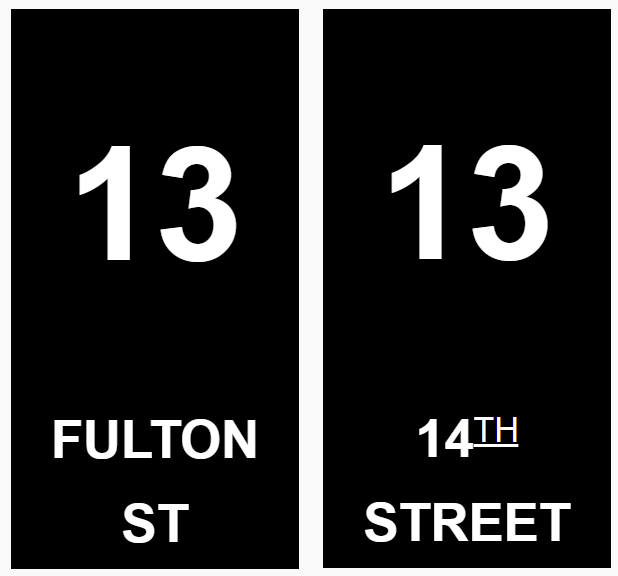

Overview
- Service type: Subway
- Status: Discontinued
- Locale: New York City, United States
- First service: 1924; 102 years ago
- Last service: 29 April 1956; 69 years ago
- Successor: IND Fulton Street Line (only east of Hudson Street)
- Former operator: BMT

Route
- Termini: Park Row; Lefferts Avenue – 119th Street

13 was the BMT's designation for service on the BMT Fulton Street Line, not to be confused with today's IND Fulton Street Line, which uses a portion of the old BMT line at its east end.

== History ==
=== 1924 ===
When the BMT assigned numbers in 1924, 13 was assigned to trains between Park Row in Manhattan and Lefferts Avenue–119th Street, via the Brooklyn Bridge and BMT Fulton Street Line. Service patterns were rather complicated, with the following services running:

==== Morning rush hours ====
- Trains beginning at Lefferts Avenue or Grant Avenue ran express from Atlantic Avenue to Franklin Avenue, and then local to Park Row.
- Trains beginning at Atlantic Avenue ran local to Park Row, or used the spur to Fulton Ferry in downtown Brooklyn.

==== Afternoon rush hours ====
- Trains from Park Row to Lefferts Avenue ran express from Sands Street (on the Brooklyn side of the Brooklyn Bridge) to Lafayette Avenue and Grand Avenue to Atlantic Avenue.
- Trains from Park Row to Grant Avenue ran express from Sands Street to Boerum Place and Flatbush Avenue to Franklin Avenue.
- Trains from Fulton Ferry ran local.
- Extra trains ran from Franklin Avenue to Lefferts Avenue, express to Atlantic Avenue.

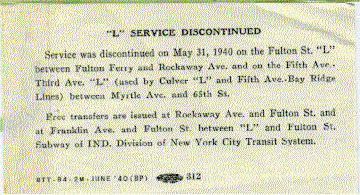
The service advisory discontinuing 13 service west of Rockaway Avenue in 1940

=== 1925 ===
By 1925, local morning trains were added from Grant Avenue to Fulton Ferry or Park Row. Between 1925 and 1931, afternoon rush hour service was changed to the following:

- Express trains from Park Row to Lefferts Avenue ran express from Sands Street to Atlantic Avenue; local trains made all stops.
- Trains from Fulton Ferry ran local.
- Extra trains ran from Sands Street to Lefferts Avenue, running express from Franklin Avenue to Atlantic Avenue.

=== 1930s ===
Between 1931 and 1937, local morning trains were shifted from beginning at Atlantic and Grant Avenues to beginning at Grant and Lefferts Avenues. Afternoon service became the following:

- Some express trains from Park Row to Lefferts Avenue ran express from Sands Street to Franklin Avenue; others from Franklin Avenue to Atlantic Avenue.
- Local trains from Park Row ended at Grant Avenue or Lefferts Avenue.
- Trains from Fulton Ferry ran local.
- Extra trains ran from Sands Street to Lefferts Avenue, running express from Franklin Avenue to Atlantic Avenue.

Extra service during all rush hours and Saturday mornings ran only from Lefferts Avenue to Atlantic Avenue.

Special 14th Street–Fulton Street Express service began on September 23, 1936, running over the BMT 14th Street-Canarsie Line from Eighth Avenue to Atlantic Avenue and over the Fulton Street Line between Hinsdale Street and Lefferts Avenue in Queens on weekdays and Saturdays during rush hours. These trips eliminated the need for riders to transfer at Atlantic Avenue. Ridership counts at the time found that during rush hours, 5,000 passengers transferred between Fulton Street and 14th Street–Canarsie trains. Four trips ran in each direction, running non-stop on the 14th Street Line between Lorimer Street and Myrtle Avenue. Initially, these trains bypassed all stops between Hinsdale Avenue and Hudson Street. Once the platform extensions at stations in between were completed on October 4, 1937, these trains began making these bypassed stops. This service could be run because of the introduction of lightweight Multi-section cars, which were light enough to run on the original elevated structure between Hudson Street and Hinsdale Avenue while being constructed of metal to run in the subway. These trains were carried signs reading "16–8th Ave." toward Manhattan and signs reading "13–Lefferts Ave." toward Queens.

Between 1937 and 1939, local morning trains were truncated at Sands Street (with some still going to Fulton Ferry).

=== Discontinuation ===
The BMT Fulton Street Line was closed west of Rockaway Avenue on May 31, 1940, with free transfers to the IND Fulton Street Line. Service from then on was limited to trains running the remaining length, as well as 14th Street–Fulton Street trains and the new Fulton–Lexington Avenue service provided by 12 trains.

On June 26, 1952, Rockaway Avenue was closed overnight, and on weekends. During these hours, 13 trains terminated at Eastern Parkway.

On April 26, 1956, the BMT Fulton Street Line was abandoned west of Hudson Street, and the rest became part of the IND Fulton Street Line on April 29.
