= Fulton Street Line (elevated) =

Former New York City rapid transit line

BMT Fulton Street Elevated
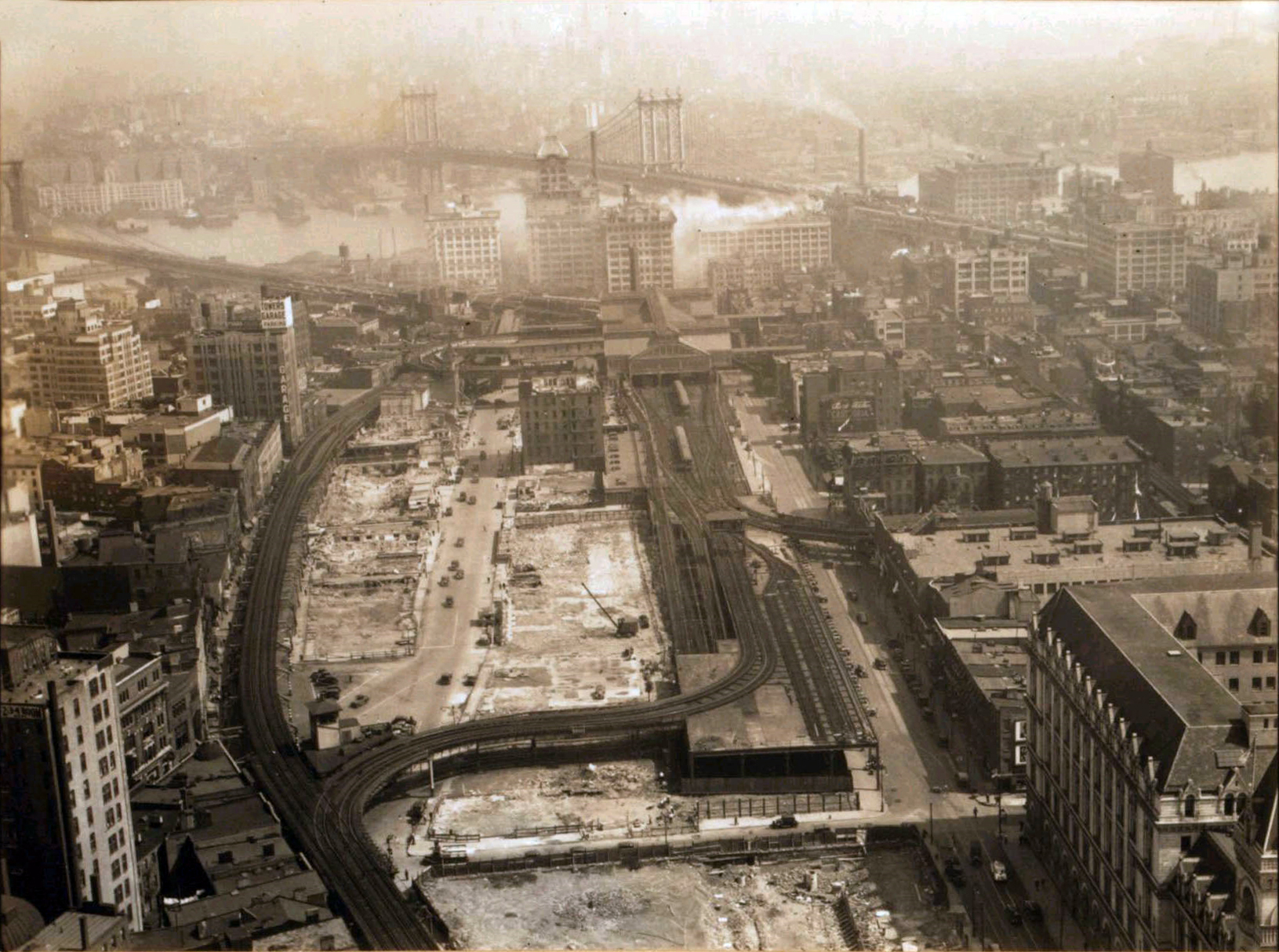
- Downtown terminals at Sands Street station in 1936, which the Fulton Street Line shared with others

Overview
- Owner: City of New York
- Termini: Fulton Ferry; Lefferts Avenue–119th Street

Service
- Type: Rapid transit
- System: Brooklyn–Manhattan Transit Corporation
- Operator: New York City Transit Authority

History
- Opened: 1888
- Completed: 1925
- Closed: 1940 (west of Rockaway Avenue); 1956 (Rockaway-Grant Avenues)

Technical
- Number of tracks: 2-3
- Character: Elevated
- Track gauge: 4 ft 8 1/2 in (1,435 mm) standard gauge

The Fulton Street Line, also called the Fulton Street Elevated or Kings County Line, was an elevated rail line mostly in Brooklyn, New York City, United States. It ran above Fulton Street from Fulton Ferry, Brooklyn, in Downtown Brooklyn east to East New York, and then south on Van Sinderen Avenue (southbound) and Snediker Avenue (northbound), east on Pitkin Avenue, north on Euclid Avenue, and east on Liberty Avenue to Ozone Park, Queens.

The portion in Brooklyn has been torn down, but most of the line in Queens has been connected to the New York City Subway and is now part of the IND Fulton Street Line (served by the A). The section of the IND Fulton Street Line in Brooklyn is an underground line, replacing the elevated line. The structure was the main line of the Kings County Elevated Railway, which first opened in 1888.

== History ==
The Kings County Elevated Railway opened the line, from dual western terminals at Fulton Ferry and Brooklyn Bridge (Sands Street) east to Nostrand Avenue, on April 24, 1888. Construction on this line started in the fall of 1885, when ground was broken at the corner of Fulton Street and Red Hook Lane. It was extended east to Albany Avenue on May 30, 1888; Albany Avenue was an eastbound-only station, and the westbound station just beyond at Sumner Avenue had yet to be completed, so it temporarily served both directions. The line was further extended to Ralph Avenue on September 20, 1888.

The Fulton Elevated Railroad was incorporated on July 6, 1888, to build a disconnected line from Greenpoint south through Williamsburg to Kent and Myrtle Avenues and to extend the Kings County Elevated east beyond Rockaway Avenue to the city line. The former was not built, but construction soon began on the latter. The first piece, over Fulton Street and Williams Place, opened on July 4, 1889, connecting with the Long Island Rail Road's Manhattan Crossing station at the new terminal at Atlantic Avenue.

It was extended further, over Snediker Avenue and Pitkin Avenue, to Van Siclen Avenue on November 18, 1889. Due to a shortage of wood for a storage yard, a temporary shuttle was operated between Pennsylvania Avenue and Van Siclen Avenue until mid-December. Construction above Pitkin Avenue progressed to Linwood Street on February 22, 1892, and Montauk Avenue on March 21, 1892. The line was completed to Grant Avenue at City Line on July 16, 1894, with the opening of a structure above Pitkin Avenue, Euclid Avenue, and Liberty Avenue.

The Kings County Elevated leased the Brooklyn and Brighton Beach Railroad on February 5, 1896. A two-block elevated connection between Franklin Avenue station and the Brighton Beach Line's Bedford station, including a new station at Dean Street, opened on August 15, 1896, and the Kings County Elevated began operating trains between the Brooklyn Bridge (Sands Street) and Brighton Beach. Through service across the Brooklyn Bridge was inaugurated on November 1, 1898 for off-peak hours.

The final extension, from Grant Avenue east to Lefferts Avenue, was built under the Dual Contracts and opened on September 25, 1915. In 1917, the Brooklyn Chamber of Commerce started fighting for the removal of the Fulton Street El. The Dual Contracts also triple-tracked the line as part of the Dual Contracts, starting in 1913. The new third track went into operation on December 27, 1915, stretching between Manhattan Junction and Nostrand Avenue. Some trains ran express in the peak direction.

This also led to the reconstruction, replacement, and elimination of some stations. The Public Service Commission received a petition on December 9, 1916, from a large number of civic and business organizations to restrict the third tracking to a point in the vicinity of Cumberland Avenue.

In 1929, the Independent Subway System (IND) began planning their own Fulton Street subway immediately below the Elevated. The underground line was opened from Jay Street to Rockaway Avenue on April 9, 1936, including a stub terminal at Court Street. Stations west of Rockaway Avenue were being made obsolete as many were being replaced by the subway stations. Trains last ran on the line west of Rockaway Avenue on May 31, 1940, and these stations were closed the following day. The total cost of demolition of the Fulton Street Elevated was $2 million.

On June 1, 1940, a free transfer was provided to the Fulton Street subway at Rockaway Avenue, and a new "Fulton–Lexington Avenue" service via the Lexington Avenue Elevated west of East New York was introduced. The remainder of the line west of Hudson Street (now 80th Street) was closed on April 26, 1956, and Fulton Street subway trains began using the line east of Hudson Street on April 29. The remaining segment of the Fulton Street Elevated east of 80th Street is now used by the A train.

== Service patterns ==
The primary service pattern was a simple one-end-to-the-other operation, until May 31, 1940, when the 13 was cut back to Rockaway Avenue, and the BMT 12 took over operations from downtown Brooklyn to Lefferts Boulevard.

== Station listing ==
Most Fulton Street trains left the line at Sands Street and ended at Park Row rather than Fulton Ferry.

Station service legend
Stops all times	Stops 24 hours a day
Stops all times except late nights	Stops every day during daytime hours only
Stops rush hours in the peak direction only	Stops during weekday rush hours in the peak direction only
Time period details
Disabled access	Station is compliant with the Americans with Disabilities Act
↑	Station is compliant with the Americans with Disabilities Act in the indicated direction only
↓	Station is compliant with the Americans with Disabilities Act in the indicated direction only
	Elevator access to mezzanine only

Name	Opened	Closed	Notes
Brooklyn
Fulton Ferry	April 24, 1888	June 1, 1940	
Sands Street	April 24, 1888	June 1, 1940	
Clark Street (eastbound); Tillary Street (westbound)	April 24, 1888		
Court Street (eastbound); Myrtle Avenue (westbound)	April 24, 1888	June 1, 1940	
Boerum Place	April 24, 1888	June 1, 1940	
Elm Place–Duffield Street	April 24, 1888	June 1, 1940	
Flatbush Avenue	April 24, 1888	June 1, 1940	
Lafayette Avenue	April 24, 1888	June 1, 1940	
Cumberland Avenue	April 24, 1888	June 1, 1940	connection to Greene and Gates Avenues Line streetcars
Vanderbilt Avenue	April 24, 1888	June 1, 1940	connection to Vanderbilt Avenue Line streetcars
Grand Avenue	April 24, 1888	June 1, 1940	connection to Putnam Avenue Line streetcars
Franklin Avenue	April 24, 1888	June 1, 1940	connection to Brighton Beach Line trains and Franklin Avenue Line streetcars
Nostrand Avenue	April 24, 1888	June 1, 1940	connection to Nostrand Avenue Line, Lorimer Street Line, Marcy Avenue Line, and Ocean Avenue Line streetcars
Brooklyn Avenue (eastbound); Tompkins Avenue (westbound)	May 30, 1888	June 1, 1940	connection to Tompkins Avenue Line streetcars
Albany Avenue (eastbound); Sumner Avenue (westbound)	May 30, 1888	between 1912 and 1924	connection to Sumner Avenue Line streetcars
Troy Avenue	between 1912 and 1924	June 1, 1940	
Reid Avenue	September 20, 1888	June 1, 1940	Connection to Reid Avenue Line streetcars. Originally named Utica Avenue, but renamed between 1912 and 1924.
Ralph Avenue	September 20, 1888	June 1, 1940	Connection to Ralph Avenue Line streetcars. Service made redundant by the Ralph Avenue subway station at the same location.
Saratoga Avenue	December 3, 1888	June 1, 1940	
Rockaway Avenue	November 16, 1888	April 26, 1956	Connection to Wilson Avenue Line streetcars. Service made redundant by the Rockaway Avenue subway station at the same location.
Manhattan Junction	July 4, 1889	between 1912 and 1924	remainder of complex still exists as Broadway Junction serving the A C J L Z trains
Atlantic Avenue	July 4, 1889	present	still serves the L train connection to Long Island Rail Road at East New York station
Eastern Parkway	November 18, 1889	November 17, 1918	
Hinsdale Street	November 17, 1918	April 26, 1956	connection to Bergen Street Line streetcars
Pennsylvania Avenue	November 18, 1889	April 26, 1956	
Van Siclen Avenue	November 18, 1889	April 26, 1956	Service made redundant by the IND's Liberty Avenue and Van Siclen Avenue subway stations.
Linwood Street	February 22, 1892	April 26, 1956	Service made redundant by the Shepherd Avenue subway station.
Montauk Avenue	March 21, 1892	April 26, 1956	
Chestnut Street	July 16, 1894	April 26, 1956	Service made redundant by the Euclid Avenue subway station.
Crescent Street	July 16, 1894	April 26, 1956	
Grant Avenue	July 16, 1894	April 26, 1956	Replaced by the underground Grant Avenue station, which serves the A train.
Queens
Hudson Street–80th Street	September 25, 1915	present	still serves the A train
Boyd Avenue–88th Street	September 25, 1915	present	still serves the A train
Rockaway Boulevard–96th Street	September 25, 1915	present	still serves the A train; IND service to the Rockaways splits from here
Oxford Avenue–104th Street	September 25, 1915	present	still serves the A train
Greenwood Avenue–111th Street	September 25, 1915	present	still serves the A train
Lefferts Avenue–119th Street	September 25, 1915	present	still serves the A train
