= Fulton Ferry station =

Fulton Ferry
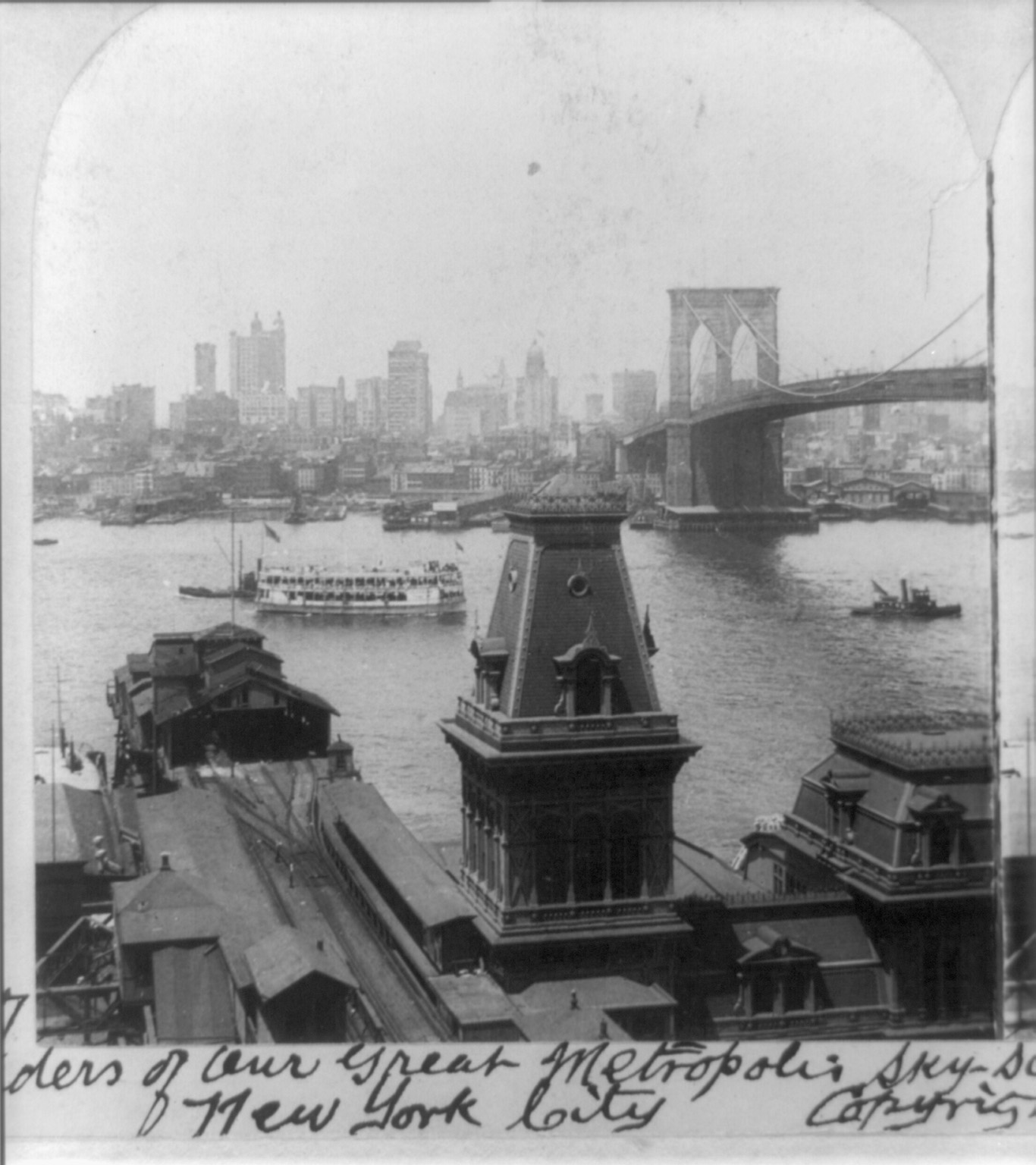
- 1904 image of the Fulton Ferry station with the ferry terminal and the Brooklyn Bridge off to the right.

General information
- Location: Fulton Ferry, Brooklyn, New York
- Coordinates: 40.703281°N 73.995085°W
- Line: BMT Fulton Street Line
- Platforms: 2 side platforms
- Tracks: 2
- Connections: Fulton Street Trolley Line; Fulton Ferry

Construction
- Structure type: Elevated

History
- Opened: April 24, 1888; 138 years ago
- Closed: June 1, 1940; 86 years ago

Services
| Preceding station | BMT Lines | Following station |
|---|---|---|
| Terminus | 13: Fulton Street | Myrtle Avenue One-way operation |
| Terminus | 13: Fulton Street | Court Street toward Lefferts Avenue |
Location

The Fulton Ferry station was a station on the demolished BMT Fulton Street Line in Brooklyn, New York City. As the name implies, it was built to serve the Fulton Ferry between the two ferry slips in Brooklyn and Manhattan. The Fulton Street Elevated was built by the Kings County Elevated Railway Company and this station started service on April 24, 1888. The station had 2 tracks and 2 side platforms. It was served by trains of the BMT Fulton Street Line, and until 1920, trains of the BMT Brighton Line.

This station was served by steam locomotives between 1888 and 1899. In 1898, the Brooklyn Rapid Transit Company (BRT) absorbed the Kings County Elevated Railway, and it took over the Fulton Street El, and it was electrified on July 3, 1899. It also had a connection to the Fulton Street trolley. Despite the fact that the ferry ceased operation on January 19, 1924, partially due to the increased use of the Brooklyn Bridge, it closed on June 1, 1940. On June 1 all service from Fulton Ferry and Park Row to Rockaway Avenue was abandoned, as it came under city ownership.
