= Kings County Elevated Railway =

Railroad company in Brooklyn, New York

The Kings County Elevated Railway Company (KCERy) was a builder and operator of elevated railway lines in Kings County, New York. Kings County is now coextensive with the borough of Brooklyn in New York City, but at the time the railway started, it consisted of several towns and the smaller independent city of Brooklyn. Its original services were operated with steam locomotives.

== Corporate history ==
The KCERy was founded January 6, 1879, but did not open its first line for revenue service until 1888. The company was organized by Judge Hiram Bond and financed by a group of investors from Boston that included Moses Kimball and Willard T. Sears of the architectural firm Cummings and Sears, which had experience in designing stone railroad bridges and ramps. The company did surveys and design work and promoted the project. Due to the principals behind the project being from out of town, the project had difficulty getting fully licensed. The package of rights and designs were sold to New York City investors led by Gen. James Jourdan due to the lack of support for the Bostonians by local political leaders. Due to the persistence of Jourdan the project eventually got off the ground. The company directors besides Jourdan were Edward A. Abbott, Henry J. Davison, Harvey Farrington, Wendell Goodwin, Henry J. Robinson, James O. Sheldon and William A. Read. William A. Read was the financier whose company Read & Company later became Dillon, Read. On October 1, 1899, the Kings County Elevated Railroad (KCERR) became successor to the KCERy, and on May 24, 1900, the KCERR was merged into its competitor, the Brooklyn Union Elevated Railroad company, thus ending its separate corporate existence.

== Fulton Street Line ==
The KCERy ran only one rapid transit mainline, the Fulton Street Elevated, beginning in 1888, but it was one of the most lucrative in Brooklyn, operating from Fulton Ferry, through the heart of the downtown area, then through the center of the borough, and the communities of Bedford-Stuyvesant, Brownsville and East New York to City Line. In addition, the KCERy later acquired access to the tracks of the Brooklyn Bridge railroad to bring its trains to the Park Row terminal in New York City (Manhattan) opposite the New York City Hall, beginning service on November 1, 1898.

== Service on the Brighton Beach Line ==
In 1896, the KCERy built a short elevated line from Franklin Avenue and Fulton Street to connect to the tracks of the Brooklyn & Brighton Beach RR south of Atlantic Avenue, permitting KCERy elevated trains access to the communities of Crown Heights, Flatbush, Midwood, Homecrest, Sheepshead Bay and Coney Island at Brighton Beach.

== Sources ==
- Documents of the Senate of the State of New York
- The New York Times: Plans of the Kings County Elevated Railroad
