= New York City Subway tiles =

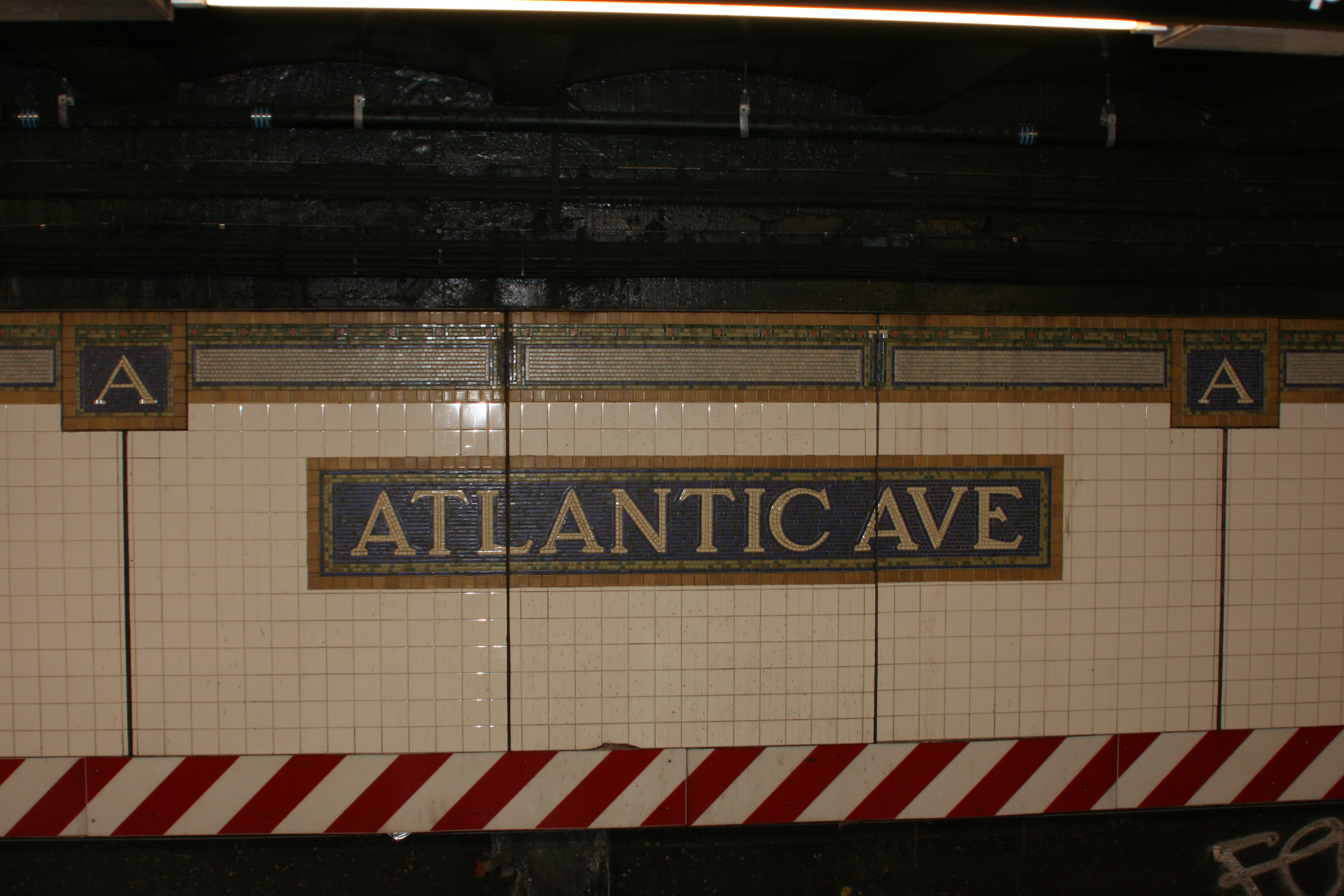
Atlantic Avenue – Barclays Center station identification on the BMT Brighton Line platform

Many New York City Subway stations are decorated with colorful ceramic plaques and tile mosaics. Of these, many take the form of signs, identifying the station's location. Much of this ceramic work was in place when the subway system originally opened on October 27, 1904. Newer work continues to be installed each year, much of it cheerful and fanciful.

== Original IRT and BMT tiles ==
=== Heins & LaFarge (1901–1907) ===
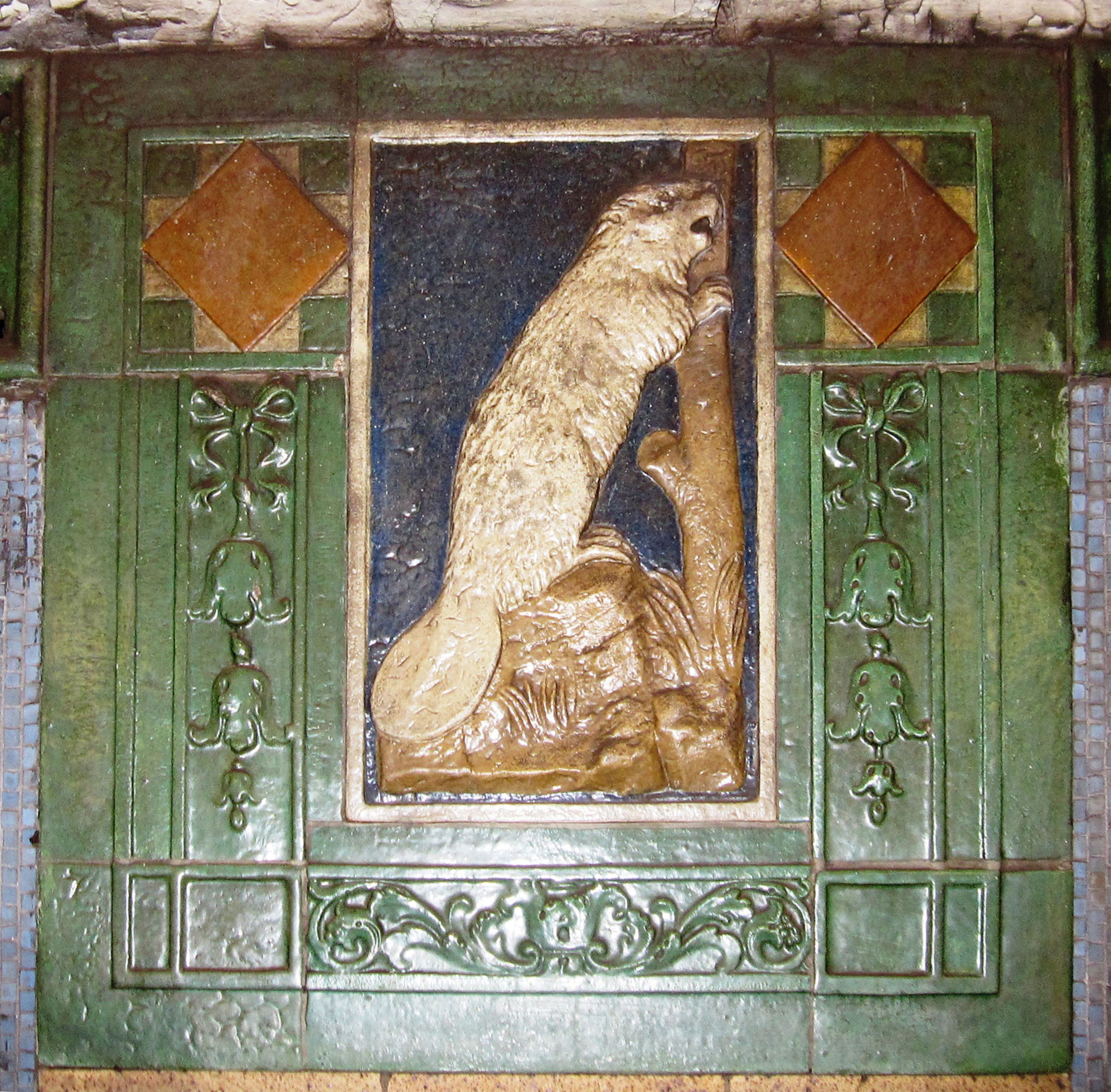
Faience plaque with beaver at Astor Place

The earliest ceramic work was done by Heins & LaFarge (artists George C. Heins and Christopher Grant LaFarge), starting in 1901 and continuing up to 1907. Heins and LaFarge were both relatives of John LaFarge (brother-in-law and son, respectively), a leading stained-glass artisan of the day. They were part of the Arts and Crafts movement and worked in the Beaux-Arts architecture style, both of which were very much in vogue at the turn of the 20th century. At the time of their hiring they had completed large projects at the Cathedral of St. John the Divine and the Bronx Zoo's Astor Court. In addition to designing the artistic motifs, Heins and LaFarge also did much of the architectural work that determined the overall appearance of entire subway stations.

They designed name tablets that were made up of tiles with the station name in serif and sans serif roman lettering, with all of the letters capitalized. Some of the tiles by Heins and LaFarge are for station directional information such as directions to exits, platforms of different lines and systems, and platforms of different directions. The name tablets in each station contained elaborate border tilework surrounding the tablet.

Heins and LaFarge knew what materials would stand up well to heavy-duty cleaning and scrubbing; they worked with the ceramic-producing firms Grueby Faience Company of Boston and Rookwood Pottery of Cincinnati.

Their ceramic artwork includes colorful pictorial motifs relevant to a station's location, for example:

- The South Ferry loop station is decorated by 15 bas-relief representations of a sailing ship on the water.
- The Astor Place station is decorated with large ceramic beaver emblems, representing the beaver pelts that helped make John Jacob Astor wealthy.
- The 116th Street – Columbia University station includes a bas-relief emblem representing nearby Columbia University.

Their bas-reliefs in the subway have been likened to the work of the Italian Renaissance artist Andrea Della Robbia. Much of their tile work was station-identifying signs to guide passengers. Besides serving an aesthetic function, the images are helpful to New York City's large population of non-English speakers and those who can't read. A traveler can be told to "get off at the stop with the picture of a beaver." As well as pictorial plaques and ceramic signs, Heins and LaFarge designed the running decorative motifs, such as egg-and-dart patterns, along station ceilings.

In addition to their wall-side tilework, Heins and LaFarge "hung large, illuminated porcelain-enamel signs over the express platforms, using black type [actually hand-lettering] on a white background and painted station names on the round cast-iron columns."

=== Squire Vickers (1906–1942) ===
In 1906, Squire J. Vickers, then a young architect, was hired. Vickers showed much respect for Heins and LaFarge, but his work consists much more of mosaics; he did not use bas-relief, citing the need for easy cleaning. Vickers also preserved the fonts that Heins and LaFarge used in their name tablets; however, in Vickers's new name tablets, the tilework on the borders of the tablets was more simplified.

In his pictorial work, Vickers emphasizes actual buildings as landmarks, such as his colorful depiction of Brooklyn Borough Hall (1919) at the station of that name, rather than Heins and LaFarge's beavers and sailing ships. He describes his technique:

"...the mosaic was of the cut variety, that is, the body is burned in strips, glazed, and then broken into irregular shapes. The designs are set by hand and shipped in sections with paper pasted on the front. These sections are set against the wall flush with the tile. In certain stations the color bands and name tablets are a combination of mosaic and hand-made tile"

— (Stookey, 1994).

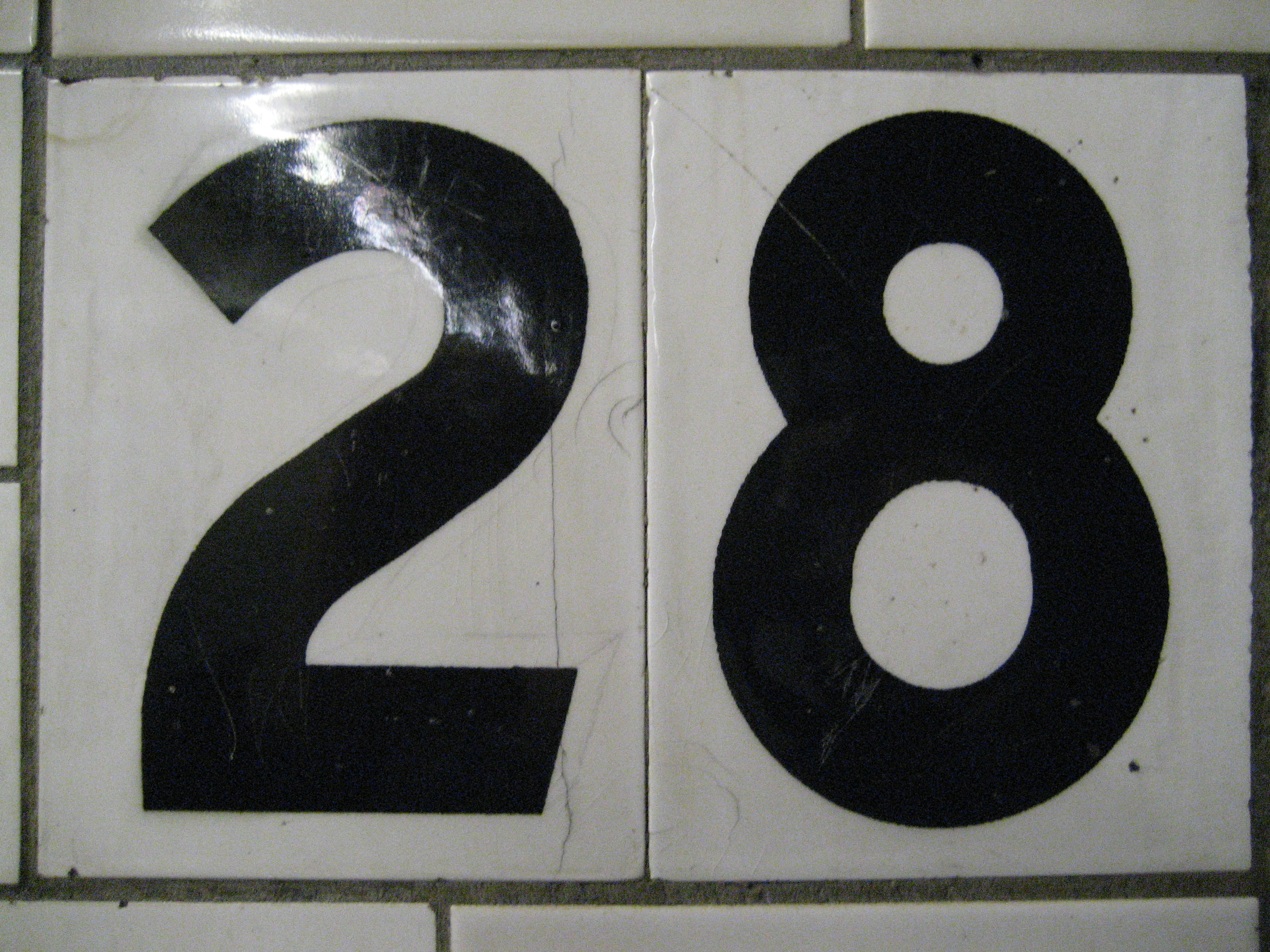
Enamel station-identification signs

Through the 1930s, Vickers ordered some enamel signs for the IRT and BMT from both Nelke Signs and the Baltimore Enamel Company. These signs were located on girder and cast-iron columns, and made them easier to identify stations. Shortened station names on the porcelain-enamel signs had a condensed sans serif capital-letter font.

Vickers continued to work on subway projects for 36 years, until 1942.

=== 2007 exhibitions ===
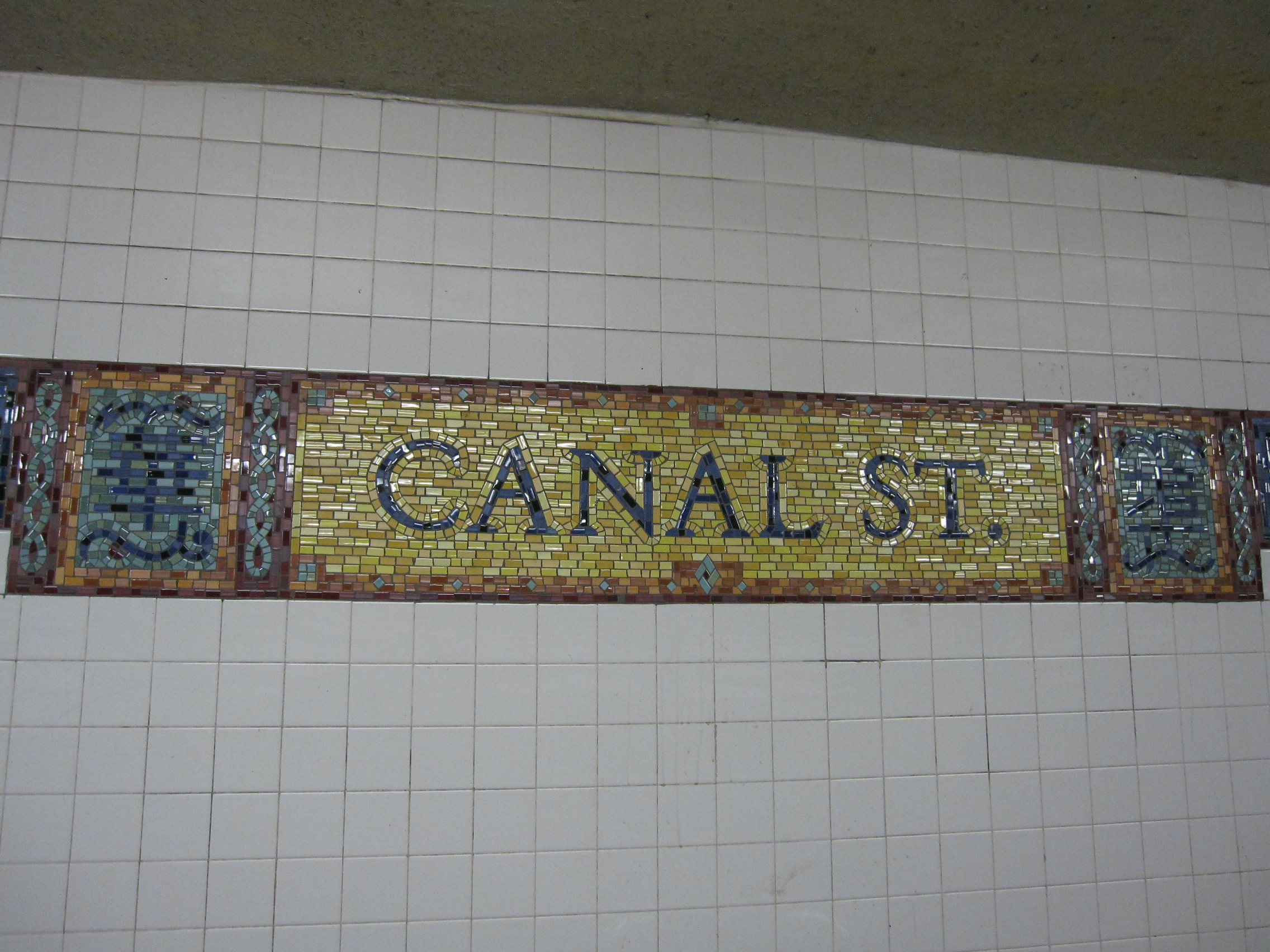
Bilingual Canal Street (BMT Broadway Line) station name

Two exhibitions, one celebrating the work of Heins & LaFarge and one for Vickers, were mounted at the New York Transit Museum's Gallery Annex at Grand Central Terminal during 2007.

== IND tiles ==
The tiles used in the Independent Subway System (IND) are very simple and austere, and usually are only of four colors: white, black, and the station-specific band and border colors of the tile. Instead of using the serif and sans-serif fonts of the IRT and BMT, the IND used a blocky geometric font, an altered version of the previous sans-serif font. The Art Deco-influenced form of the IND's tiles was designed in part by Vickers, who integrated directional signs mainly into the walls themselves.

The station-specific tiles used in the IND's stations are all color-coded in a specific five-color pattern, as they had originally been designed to facilitate navigation for travelers going away from Manhattan. With one exception, these groupings follow the same order going outbound: purple (violet), blue, green, yellow, and red. The exception is on the IND Fulton Street Line: Utica Avenue/Ralph Avenue/Rockaway Avenue (red family) is followed by blue family stations, Broadway Junction, Liberty Avenue, Van Siclen Avenue, and Shepherd Avenue, then purple (Euclid Avenue), then green (Grant Avenue).

As one goes uptown or away from Manhattan, the color of the tiles changes whenever there is an express station on a physical line. Thus, a local station that comes directly west of an express station has the same color tiles as the next express station away from Manhattan. Express stations have wider tile bands than local stations, except at some stations where the walls have been refurbished. Tablets are simple, with a common design, and black tile with white letters spell out the station name on the wall.

There are also nuances on the tile bands along the Eighth Avenue Line, the first of the IND lines to be opened. Since there were nine express stations along the line, there were ten color groupings, which meant that there were two tile families of the same color on the same line. The line started with the purple family tiles at High Street, and the fifth express station on the line was at 42nd Street, where the tile color pattern started over from the purple family tiles. Therefore, 42nd Street and all stations north contained band borders that consisted of half-height black tiles. The next station south, 34th Street–Penn Station, and all stations south contained band borders with half-height tiles that were of a deeper shade of that station's tile colors. For instance, 34th Street would have a red tile color and a deep red tile band border.

Most pre-1955 IND stations have tile plaques with the station name, as well as a colored stripe with black borders, on the platforms or track walls. Tile plaques only exist in stations where there is a wall next to the platform. The number of tiles between the stripes are 2 tiles for local stations and three for express/transfer stations. Several original stations that were renovated, such as Lexington Avenue / 53rd Street, have no color.

The IND Crosstown Line, having no express stations, uses three forms of green in its tile bands, with light green indicating transfer stations. (Broadway was planned as a transfer to an unbuilt IND Second System line; thus, the walls at Broadway have three rows of tiles, rather than the two rows of tiles found on other Crosstown Line stations' walls).

External image
- Infographic by Andrew Lynch (archived on 26 August 2023)

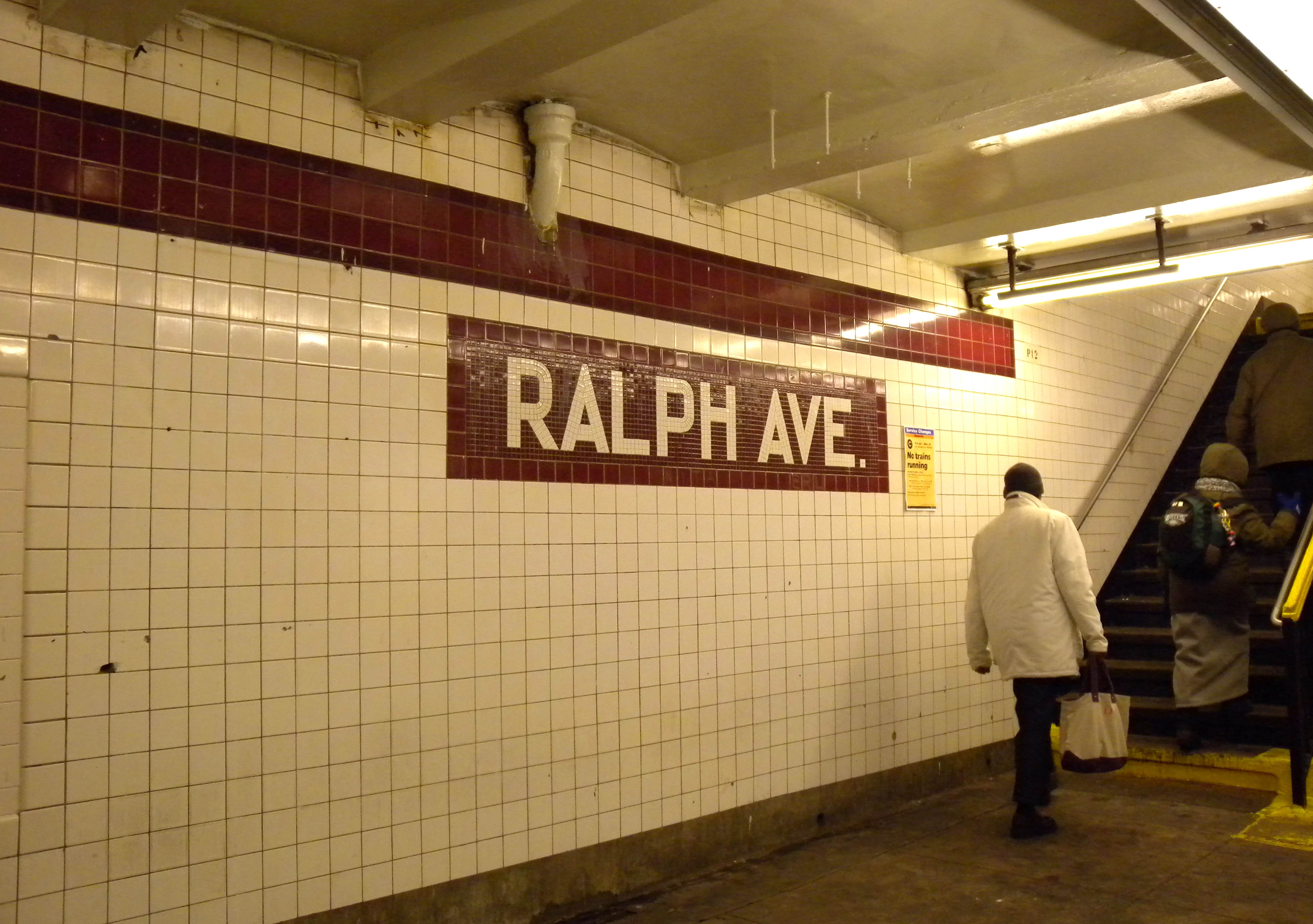
Red Family
("RALPH AVE.")

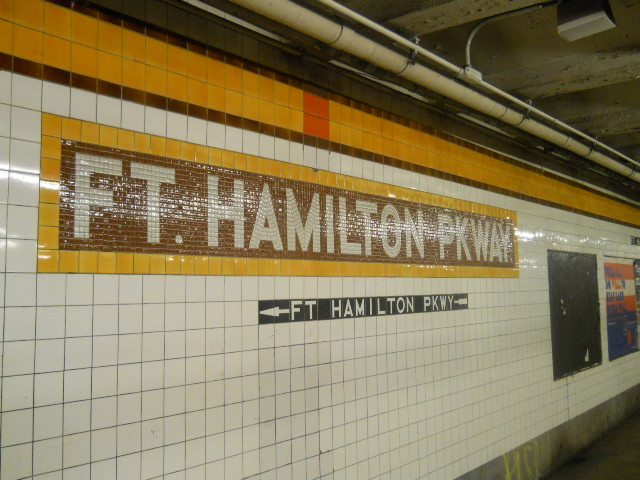
Yellow Family
("FT. HAMILTON PKWAY.")

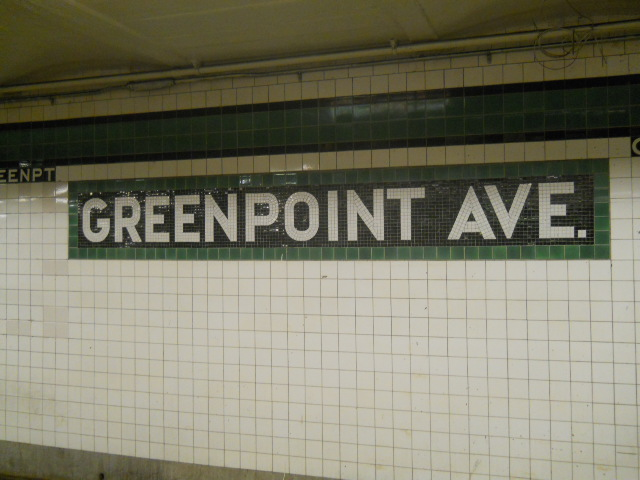
Green Family
("GREENPOINT AVE.")

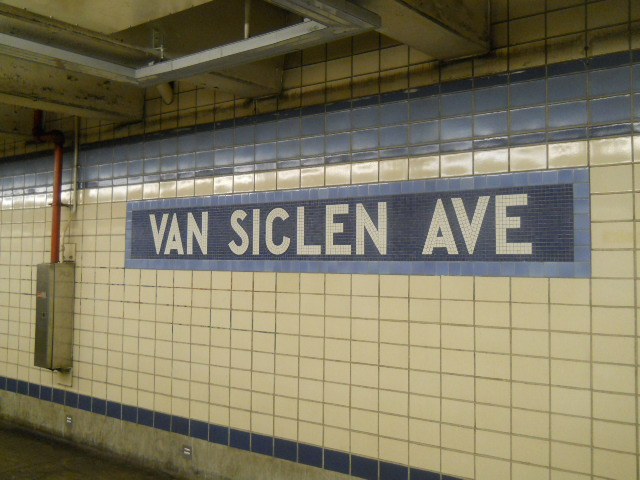
Blue Family
("VAN SICLEN AVE")

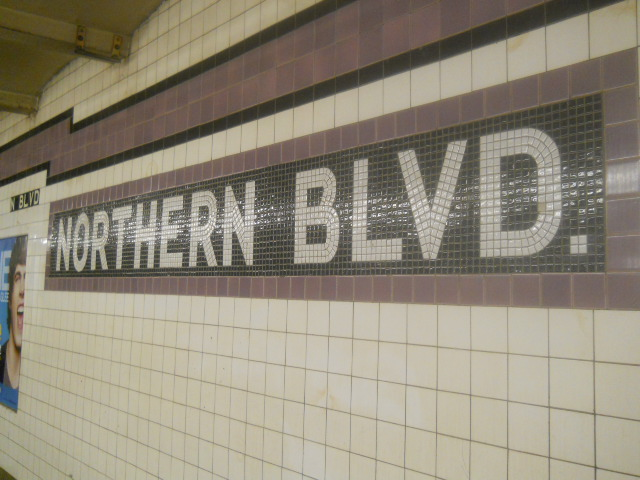
Purple Family
("NORTHERN BLVD.")

List of IND tile colors by station (underground stations only)
Station	Band Color	Border Color	Tile Height	Notes
Red Family
169th Street	Carmine Red	Black	2	
Parsons Boulevard	Scarlet Red	Black	3	
Court Square – 23rd Street	Scarlet Lake	Dark Brown	2	(Note: Some tiles at east end city bound platform are "Crimson Lake")
5th Avenue – 53rd Street	Carmine Red	Crimson	2	(Note: Replacement tiles. Original tiles were marine green upstairs, maroon downstairs)
47th–50th Streets	Scarlet Red	Dark Brown	3	
42nd Street–6th Avenue	Scarlet Red	Dark Brown	3	
34th Street–Penn Station	Burgundy	Black	2	
168th Street	Burgundy	Black	2	
207th Street	Claret Red	Pearl Grey	2	(Note: Replacement tile, 2–1/8" square. Original wall tile had no color band.)
Tremont Avenue	Claret Red	Black	3	
182nd–183rd Streets	Claret Red	Black	2	
Utica Avenue	Tuscan Red	Maroon	3	
Ralph Avenue	Tuscan Red	Maroon	2	
Rockaway Avenue	Tuscan Red	Maroon	2	
Church Avenue	Burgundy	Maroon	2	
Fulton Street	Tuscan Red	Maroon	2	(Note: Not an IND station. Dual contract opened 1931, built in IND style.) (Note: Replaced 1995 with traditional BMT tiles)
Yellow Family
Sutphin Boulevard	Sunshine Yellow	Black	2	
Briarwood	Corn Yellow	Black	2	
Union Turnpike	Jasmine	Black	3	
14th Street–8th Avenue	Mustard Yellow	Terra Cotta Brown	2	
145th Street	Deep Yellow	Black	2	
34th Street	Deep Yellow	Yellow Ochre	3	(Note: Replaced in the early 1990s with non-traditional IND motif)
155th Street	Deep Yellow	Black	2	
161st Street – Yankee Stadium	Mustard Yellow	Black	2	(Note: Replacement tiles. Original tiles were yellow–orange and black)
167th Street	Spanish Orange	Black	2	
170th Street	Spanish Orange	Black	2	
174th–175th Streets	Deep Yellow	Black	2	
Seventh Avenue	Orange Yellow	Brown	3	(Note: Top border only is full tile height)
15th Street – Prospect Park	Orange Yellow	Brown	3	
Fort Hamilton Parkway	Orange Yellow	Brown	2	
Nostrand Avenue	Maize	Saddle Brown	3	
Kingston–Throop Avenues	Maize	Saddle Brown	2	
Broad Street	Deep Yellow	Saddle Brown	3	
Green Family
75th Avenue	Light Green	Black	2	
Forest Hills – 71st Avenue	Nile Green	Black	3	
23rd Street	Medium Light Green	True Green	2	
14th Street	Medium Light Green	True Green	2	
West 4th Street	Grass Green	Chrome Green	2	
125th Street	Marine Green	Black	2	
Bedford Park Boulevard	Grass Green	Chrome Green	3	
205th Street	Medium Light Green	Campus Green	2	
Court Square	Hunter Green	Black	2	
21st Street	Hunter Green	Black	2	
Greenpoint Avenue	Hunter Green	Black	2	
Nassau Avenue	Hunter Green	Black	2	
Metropolitan Avenue	Nile Green	Black	2	
Broadway	Nile Green	Black	2	
Flushing Avenue	Light Green	True Green	2	
Myrtle–Willoughby Avenues	Light Green	True Green	2	
Bedford–Nostrand Avenues	Light Green	True Green	2	
Classon Avenue	Light Green	True Green	2	
Clinton–Washington Avenues	Light Green	True Green	2	
Fulton Street	Light Green	True Green	2	
Hoyt–Schermerhorn Streets	Light Green	True Green	2	(Note: Slight variant shades at east end platform wall)
Lafayette Avenue	Light Green	True Green	2	
Clinton–Washington Avenues	Light Green	True Green	2	
Franklin Avenue	Light Green	True Green	2	
Grant Avenue	Bottle Green	Ice Green		(Note: Rectangular tiles, new style circa 1950s)
Bergen Street	Bottle Green	Light Green	2	(Note: Replacement tiles. Original tiles were the same as those at Carroll Street, but 3 tiles high.)
Carroll Street	Lawn Green	Hunter Green	2	
Blue Family
67th Avenue	Sky Blue	Black	2	
63rd Drive	Sky Blue	Black	2	
Woodhaven Boulevard	Cerulean Blue	Black	2	
Grand Avenue	True Blue	Black	2	
Elmhurst Avenue	True Blue	Black	2	
Roosevelt Avenue – 74th Street	Violet Blue	Black	2	
59th Street	Ultramarine Blue	Black	2	
81st Street	Midnight Blue	Black	1	(Note: 1" hairline border. Upper level tile band is wider than lower level. Upper level has 4 1/4" tiles; lower level has 2 1/8" tiles (exclusive of border).)
Kingsbridge Road	Ultramarine Blue	Cobalt Blue	3	
Spring Street	Ultramarine Blue	Cobalt Blue	2	(Note: Replacement tiles at north end ultramarine blue, navy blue)
Canal Street	Royal Blue	Black	3	(Note: Replacement tiles. Original tiles were ultramarine blue and cobalt blue)
Jay Street	Ultramarine Blue	Cobalt Blue	2	
Broadway – Lafayette Street	Royal Blue	Black	3	(Note: Replacement tiles. Original tiles were powder blue, true blue)
York Street	Cloud Blue	Periwinkle Blue	1	(Note: Faded by time from shades of violet – see East Broadway, Delancey Street,2nd Avenue.)
Broadway Junction	Blueberry	Delft Blue	3	
Liberty Avenue	Cornflower Blue	Ultramarine Blue	2	
Van Siclen Avenue	Cornflower Blue	Ultramarine Blue	2	
Shepherd Avenue	Cornflower Blue	Ultramarine Blue	2	
Court Street	Aquamarine Blue	Royal Blue	2	
Eighth Avenue	Ultramarine Blue	Cobalt Blue	2	
Purple Family
179th Street	Violet	Black		(Note: Replaced with blue and orange metal wall decoration)
65th Street	Mauve	Black	2	
Northern Boulevard	Mauve	Black	2	
46th Street	Grape	Black	2	
Steinway Street	Grape	Black	2	
36th Street	Grape	Black	2	
Queens Plaza	Black Grape	Black	3	
Seventh Avenue	Royal Purple	Black		(Note: Replacement tiles. Original tiles were dark violet and black) (Note: Replacement tiles do not use full 4 1/4" squares, use six smaller ones)
42nd Street	Orchid	Black	2	(Note: Replacement tiles, original was orchid/black, have large white "42" superimposed on tile band)
Chambers Street	Blue Violet	Black		(Note: Replacement tiles. Original tiles were plum/prune)
World Trade Center	Concord Grape	Black	3	(Note: Replacement tile–prefab panels (express platform only))
Fulton Street	Violet	Grape	2	
High Street	Violet	Grape	2	
Euclid Avenue	Lilac	Medium Violet	3	
Second Avenue	Medium Violet	Violet	3	
Delancey Street	Lavender Blue	Grape	2	
East Broadway	Lavender Blue	Black	3	
Fordham Road	Grape	Plum	3	
No color
175th Street
Lexington Avenue–53rd Street
Color only on station plaque
Dyckman Street	Burgundy			
190th Street – Overlook Terrace	Burgundy			
181st Street	Burgundy			
163rd Street – Amsterdam Avenue	Orange Yellow			
155th Street	Orange Yellow			
135th Street	Marine Green			
116th Street	Midnight Blue			
110th Street	Midnight Blue			
96th Street	Midnight Blue			
86th Street	Midnight Blue			
72nd Street	Midnight Blue			
50th Street	Orchid			
23rd Street	Deep Yellow			
Stations not in the original IND with tiles
Grand Street	Blue			
57th Street	White			
Lexington Avenue – 63rd Street	Orange (Note: The original tiles were orange and beige, but the tiles were taken down and the wall was demolished in 2012. Replacement tiles are white with black horizontal stripes.)			
Roosevelt Island	White			
21st Street – Queensbridge	Brick red			
Jamaica – Van Wyck	Orange			
Sutphin Boulevard – Archer Avenue – JFK Airport	Grey			
Jamaica Center – Parsons/Archer	Tan			

== Newer tiles ==
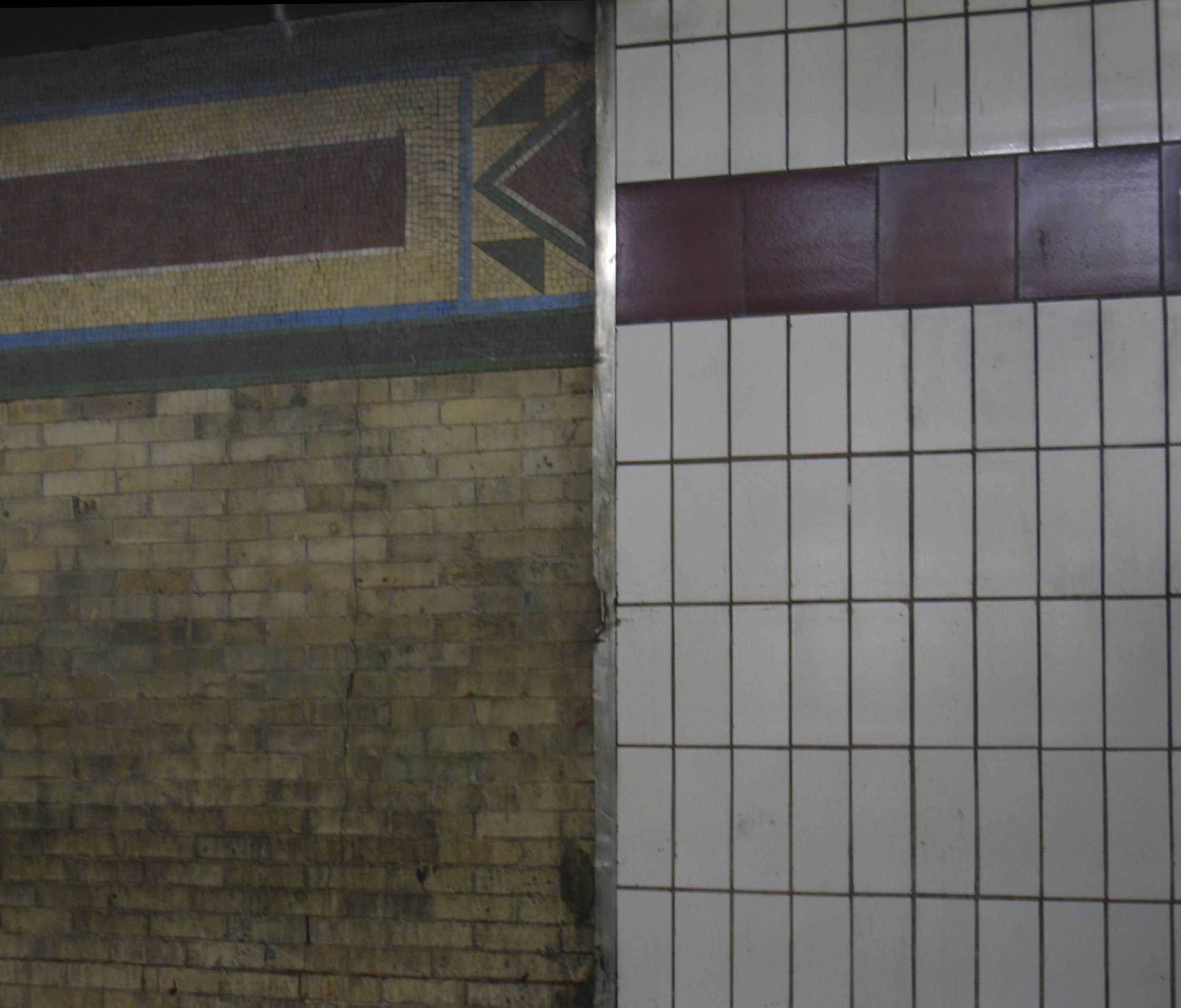
Old and new tiles at the 149th Street – Grand Concourse station

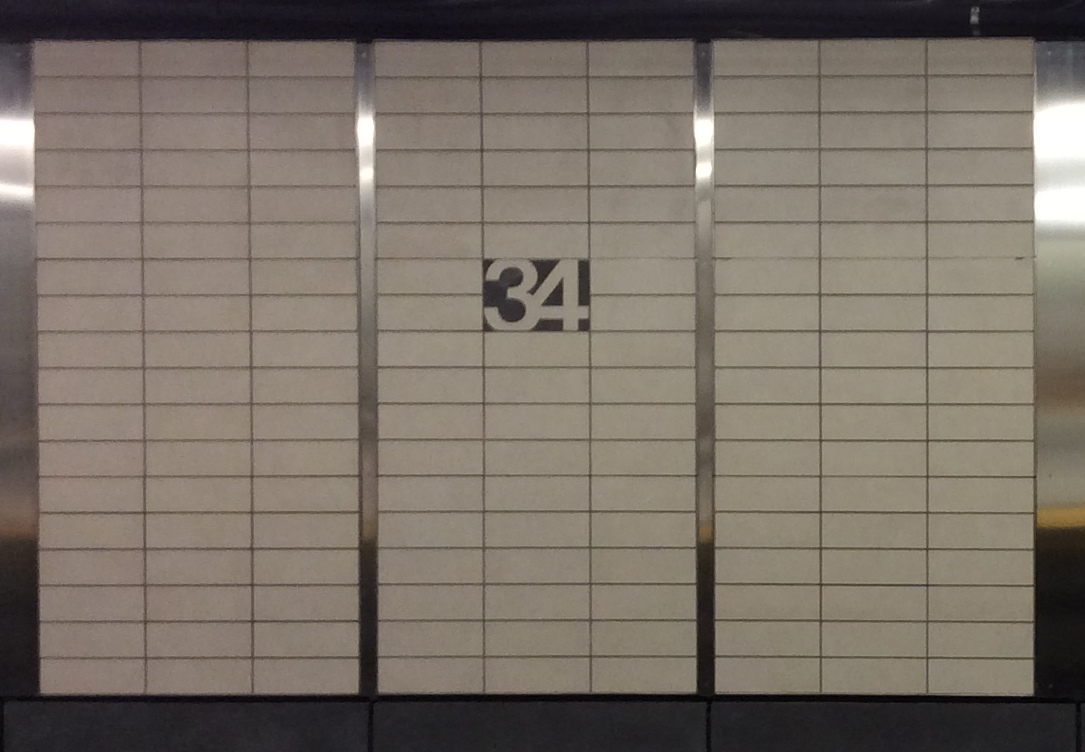
The trackside tiles at the 34th Street station

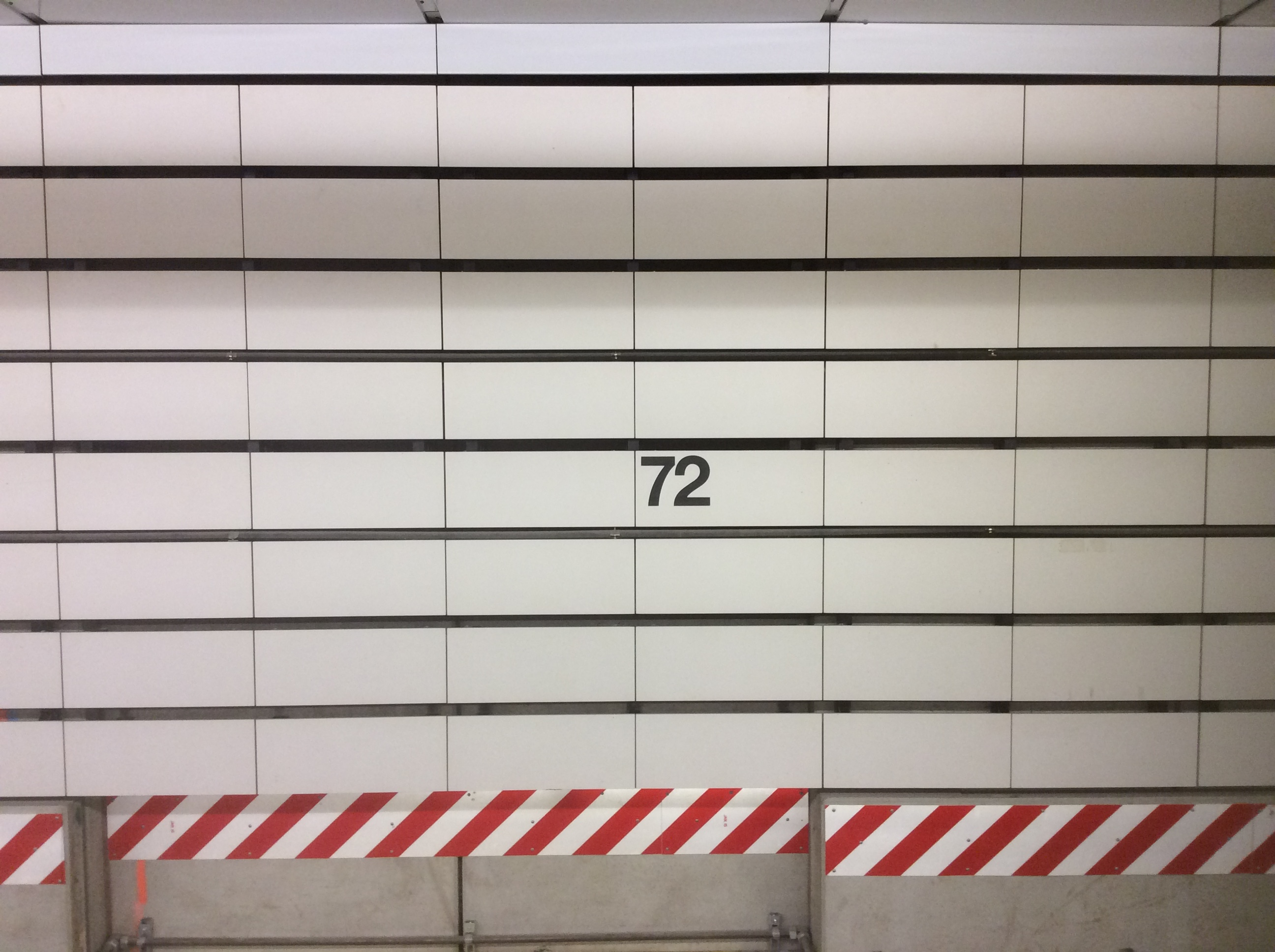
The trackside tiles at the 72nd Street station

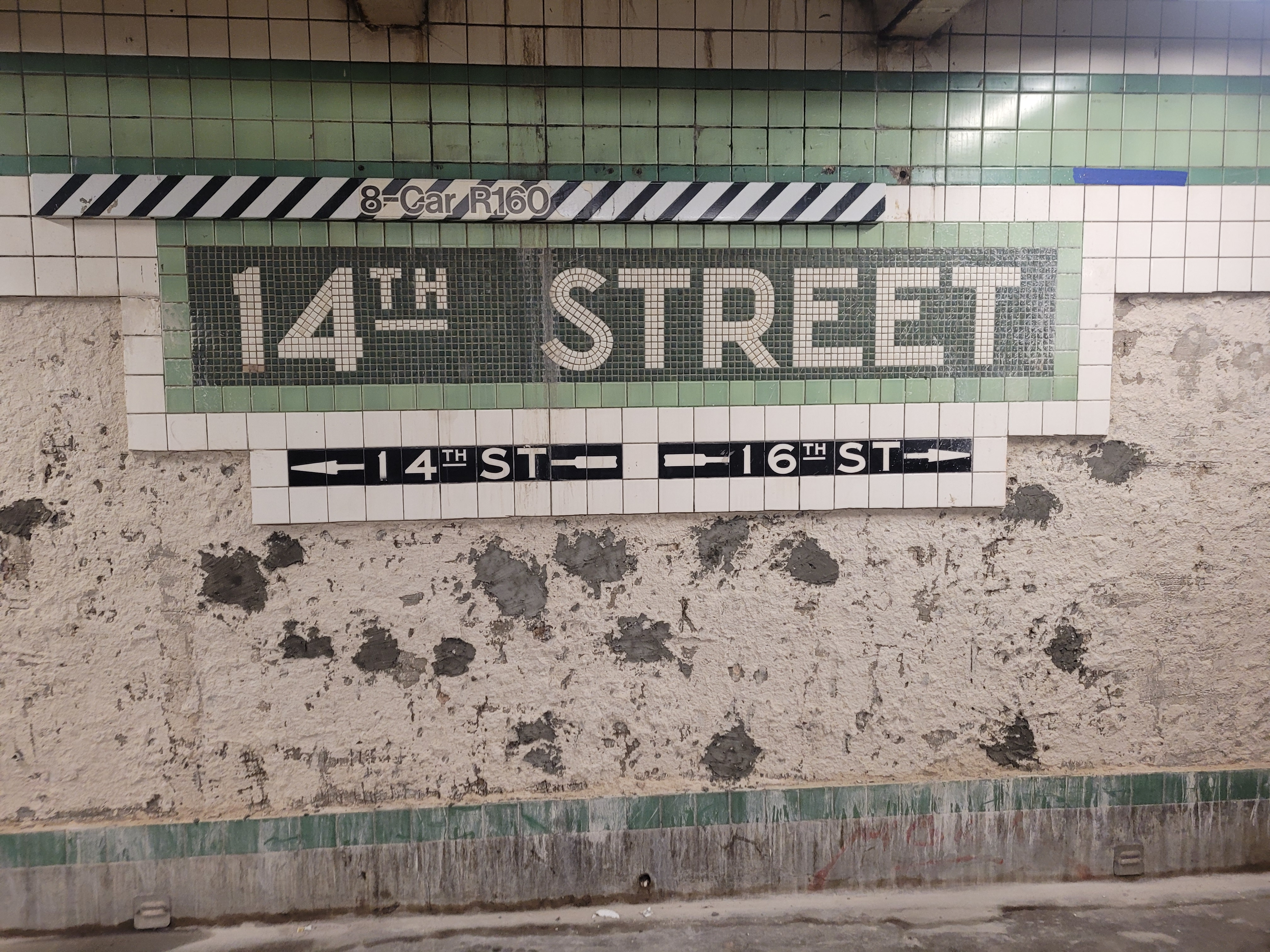
14th Street/Sixth Avenue station in 2023 under renovation, with old tiles removed

=== Glazed tiles (1950s–1970s) ===
By the 1950s, trains were increased in length from 5 cars to 8–10 cars. Glazed tiles in colors such as dull green, ochre, and blue adorned the new station extensions' walls. Letters were screened onto the tiles in black sans serif font.

=== Porcelain tiles (late 2000s–present) ===
New stations on the Second Avenue Subway have porcelain tiles and built-in artwork.

The walls adjacent to the tracks at the new 34th Street station have white tiles arranged in sets of three columns of 3 tiles each. There are two-tile-high gray squares containing white "34"s in the middle of each set of columns.

The South Ferry station has white porcelain tiles separated by rows of metal.

== Renovated and new tiles in existing stations ==
Several subway stations have new ceramics and mosaics:

- The 28th Street station on the BMT Broadway Line features the fanciful "City Dwellers" mosaic by Mark Hadjipateras.
- The Houston Street station on the IRT Broadway – Seventh Avenue Line displays "Platform Diving" by Deborah Brown.
- The 81st Street – Museum of Natural History station on the IND Eighth Avenue Line has "For Want of a Nail" by the MTA Arts for Transit Design Team.
- The Prince Street station on the BMT Broadway Line shows "Carrying On", an artwork by Janet Zweig.
- The Cathedral Parkway – 110th Street station on the IND Eighth Avenue Line boasts "Migration" by artist Christopher Wynter.
- The 191st Street station on the IRT Broadway – Seventh Avenue Line has been renovated with reproductions of its original tile work.

The MTA also contracts with an external supplier to restore existing IRT, BMT, and IND tiles. As of 2026, a single manufacturer—Robert Shenfeld of Syracuse, New York—creates all the replacement tiles for the New York City Subway system.
