= Van Siclen Avenue =

Van Siclen Avenue may refer to the following stations of the New York City Subway in Brooklyn:

- Van Siclen Avenue (BMT Jamaica Line), serving the J and Z trains
- Van Siclen Avenue (BMT Fulton Street Line), a former elevated station; now demolished
- Van Siclen Avenue (IND Fulton Street Line), serving the A and C trains
- Van Siclen Avenue (IRT New Lots Line), serving the 2, 3, 4, and 5 trains
- Neptune Avenue (IND Culver Line), formerly Van Sicklen; serving the F and <F> trains
