= Linwood Street station =

Linwood Street
- Former New York City Subway station

Station statistics
- Address: Pitkin Avenue & Linwood Street; Brooklyn, NY 11208
- Borough: Brooklyn
- Locale: East New York
- Coordinates: 40.673860°N 73.882586°W
- Division: B (BMT)
- Line: BMT Fulton Street Line
- Services: None
- Structure: Elevated
- Platforms: 2 side platforms
- Tracks: 2

Other information
- Opened: February 22, 1892; 133 years ago
- Closed: April 26, 1956; 69 years ago

Station succession
- Next west: Van Siclen Avenue
- Next east: Montauk Avenue
Location

Street map
Station service legend
Symbol	Description
Stops all times	Stops in station at all times
Stops all times except late nights	Stops all times except late nights
Stops late nights only	Stops late nights only
Stops late nights and weekends	Stops late nights and weekends only
Stops weekdays during the day	Stops weekdays during the day
Stops weekends during the day	Stops weekends during the day
Stops all times except rush hours in the peak direction	Stops all times except rush hours in the peak direction
Stops all times except weekdays in the peak direction	Stops all times except weekdays in the peak direction
Stops daily except rush hours in the peak direction	Stops all times except nights and rush hours in the peak direction
Stops rush hours only	Stops rush hours only
Stops rush hours in the peak direction only	Stops rush hours in the peak direction only
Station closed	Station is closed
(Details about time periods)

The Linwood Street station was a station on the demolished BMT Fulton Street Line in Brooklyn, New York City. It had 2 tracks and 2 side platforms. It was served by trains of the BMT Fulton Street Line. The station was built on February 22, 1892, and served as the eastern terminus of the Fulton Street elevated line for one month. The next stop to the east was Montauk Avenue. The next stop to the west was Van Siclen Avenue. On November 28, 1948, the Independent Subway System opened the underground Shepherd Avenue Subway station two blocks east after years of war-time construction delays. This station rendered both Linwood Street station and the nearby Montauk Avenue station obsolete, and it closed on April 26, 1956.
