= Liberty Avenue station =

New York City Subway station in Brooklyn

Liberty Avenue
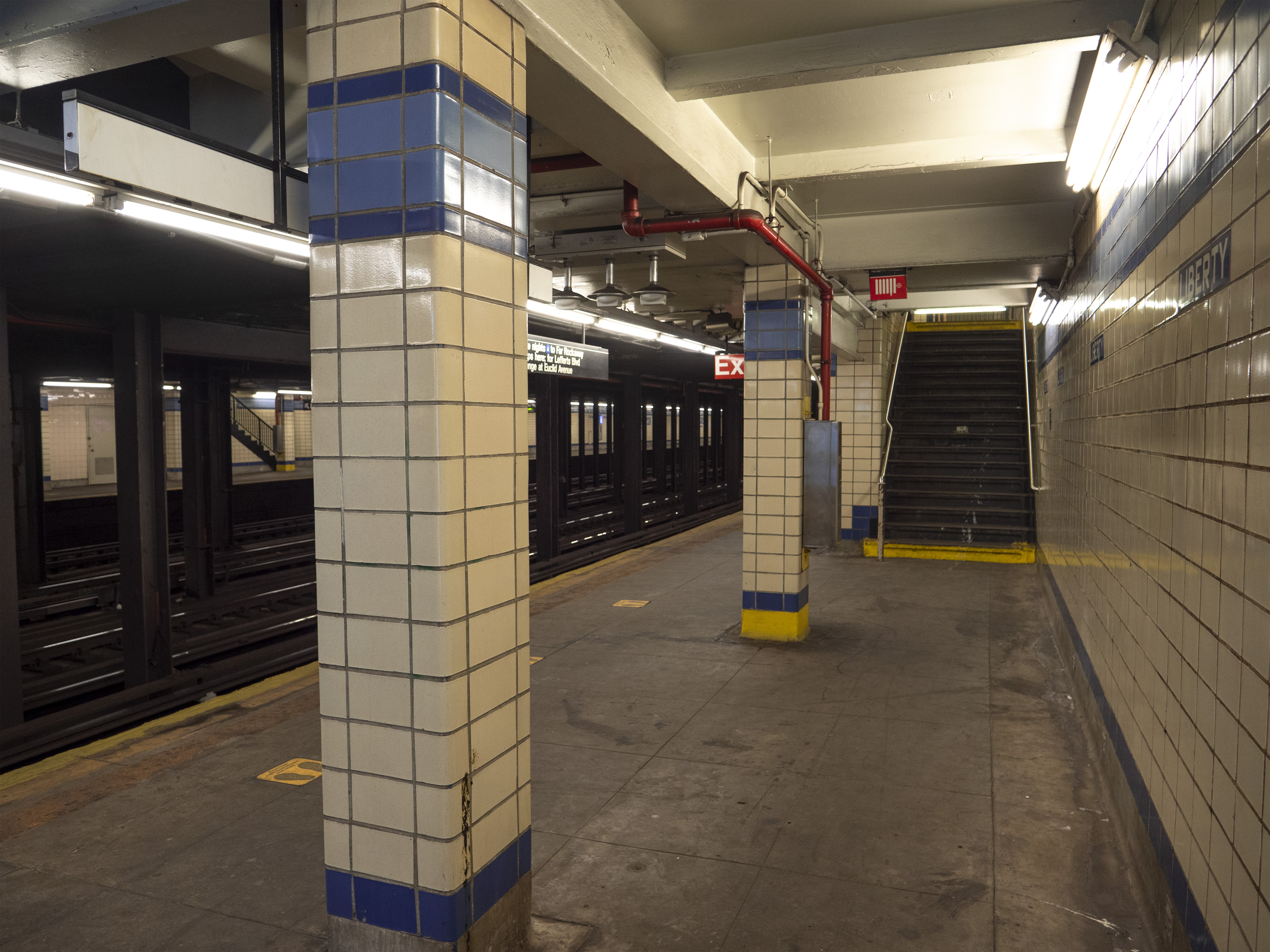
- View from southbound platform

Station statistics
- Address: Liberty Avenue & Pennsylvania Avenue; Brooklyn, New York
- Borough: Brooklyn
- Locale: East New York
- Coordinates: 40.674357°N 73.896489°W
- Division: B (IND)
- Line: IND Fulton Street Line
- Services: A (late nights); C (all except late nights)
- Transit: NYCT Bus: B20, B83, Q24
- Structure: Underground
- Platforms: 2 side platforms
- Tracks: 4

Other information
- Opened: November 28, 1948; 77 years ago

Traffic
- 2025: 548,626 ▲8.8%
- Rank: 386 out of 423
Services
Preceding station	New York City Subway	Following station
Broadway Junction A C toward 168th Street	Local	Van Siclen Avenue A C toward Euclid Avenue
Location
Location within New York City Subway
Location within New York City
Location within New York
Track layout
Street map
Station service legend
Symbol	Description
Stops all times except late nights	Stops all times except late nights
Stops late nights only	Stops late nights only

The Liberty Avenue station is a local station on the IND Fulton Street Line of the New York City Subway, located at the intersection of Liberty and Pennsylvania Avenues in East New York, Brooklyn. It is served by the C train at all times except late nights, when the A train takes over service.

Construction on the Liberty Avenue station started in 1938 as part of a four-station extension of the Fulton Street subway along Pitkin Avenue. Work was delayed by funding problems due to World War II, even though the stations were mostly complete. Construction resumed on the extension of the Fulton Street Line in November 1946, and this part of the Fulton Street Line opened in 1948.

== History ==
=== Planning ===
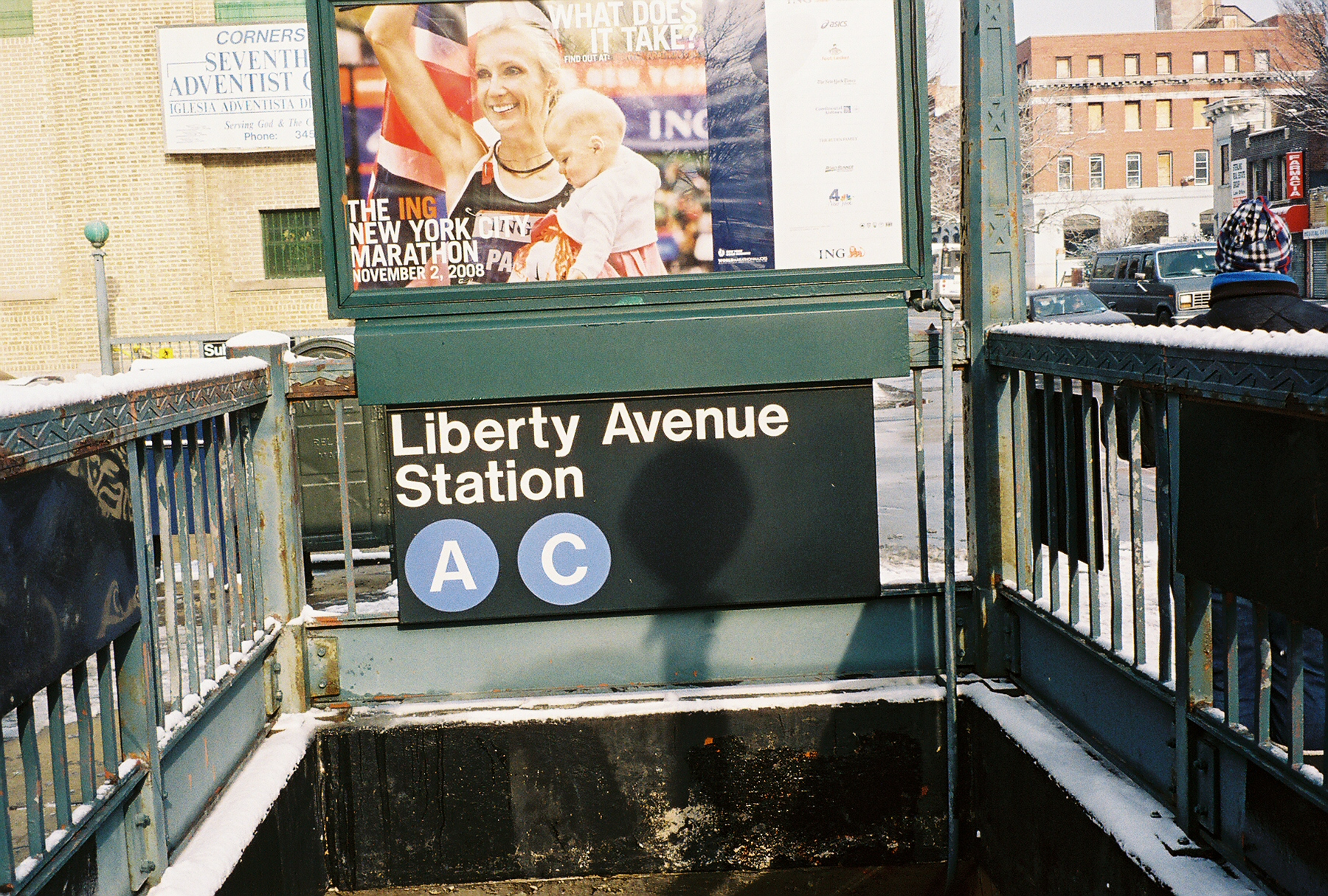
One of the street level entrances

Liberty Avenue was part of a four-station extension of the Fulton Street subway along Pitkin Avenue, past its original planned terminus at Broadway Junction. The Fulton Street subway was the city-owned Independent System (IND)'s main line from Downtown Brooklyn to southern Queens. The line was proposed by the New York City Board of Transportation (BOT) to replace the Brooklyn–Manhattan Transit Corporation's Fulton Street elevated line, which had been in operation since 1888.

The BOT formally announced that it planned to construct a four-track subway under Fulton Street from Lafayette Avenue to Alabama Avenue as part of the IND on March 31, 1927. The BOT's Chief Engineer, Robert Ridgway, was directed to investigate possible routes for the line to take from there to the border between Brooklyn and Queens, whether via Atlantic Avenue, Liberty Avenue, or other streets. Ridgway proposed extending the line via Liberty Avenue to connect with the Fulton Street Elevated at Grant Avenue as part of the IND Second System plan of 1929. The route of the line through East New York was established in May 1930, with the line turning off Fulton Street at Truxton Street, before running via Norman Place and under private property before traveling underneath Liberty Avenue to 80th Street, where it would connect to the elevated line.

Further construction past the line's initial terminal at Rockaway Avenue was delayed by funding problems due to the Great Depression in the 1930s. This was temporarily solved by federal Works Progress Administration funding starting in 1936. On July 15, 1937, the BOT submitted a modified plan for the extension of the Fulton Street Line, Route 110-B, to the New York City Board of Estimate. The line would extend from the then-under construction Broadway–East New York station along Pennsylvania Avenue, Pitkin Avenue, Linden Boulevard and Eastern Parkway to 106th Street in southern Queens. This route was formally adopted by the BOT on January 4, 1938, and by the Board of Estimate on January 20, 1938.

On April 22, 1938, the BOT held a public hearing on the proposed terms of the contract to construct Route 110, Section 7, the section of the line along Pennsylvania Avenue between Fulton Street and Bradford Street, which included the Liberty Avenue station. On May 31, 1938, the BOT invited contractors to bid on this section, and on the Route 110, Section 8, which ran along Pitkin Avenue from Bradford Street to Ashford Street. On July 21, 1938, the BOT awarded the contract to construct these two sections to the George H. Flynn Corporation for $5,220,392.

=== Construction and opening ===
The portion continuing from east of Rockaway Avenue along Pennsylvania and Pitkin Avenues to Crystal Street, including the Liberty Avenue station, began construction later in 1938. On November 18, 1941, it was announced that construction on the line would likely have to halt and the tunnel would have to be boarded up following the completion of tunneling due to material shortages during World War II, with defense industries getting priority to copper, steel and power equipment. Copper wire would be needed for lighting, signaling and telephones, and steel would be needed for power equipment, signaling and other installations. At the time of the announcement, work was being done to shore up the tunnel walls, to replace the wooden decking covering the open cut with pavement, and finishing the stations.

With the completion of tunneling by December 1942, work halted on the subway extension: the Broadway−East New York station was complete but not in operation due to lack of signal equipment, and the remaining stations to Euclid Avenue were unfinished shells. At the time, work on the section that included the Liberty Avenue station was more than 99% complete, but vital equipment had yet to be installed, precluding its opening.

Construction resumed on the extension of the Fulton Street Line in November 1946, following the conclusion of the war and the allocation of funds obtained by Mayor William O'Dwyer. After several test runs, the station opened to the public in the early morning of November 28, 1948, along with the rest of the line to Euclid Avenue. The cost of the extension was about $46.5 million. Because Liberty Avenue and three other stations were completed later than the rest of the line, they received different design features than other IND stations, including different wall tiles and fluorescent lighting. It later became the replacement for the elevated BMT Fulton Street Line's Pennsylvania Avenue station, which closed on April 26, 1956 when the connection to the eastern Fulton elevated was opened.

== Station layout ==
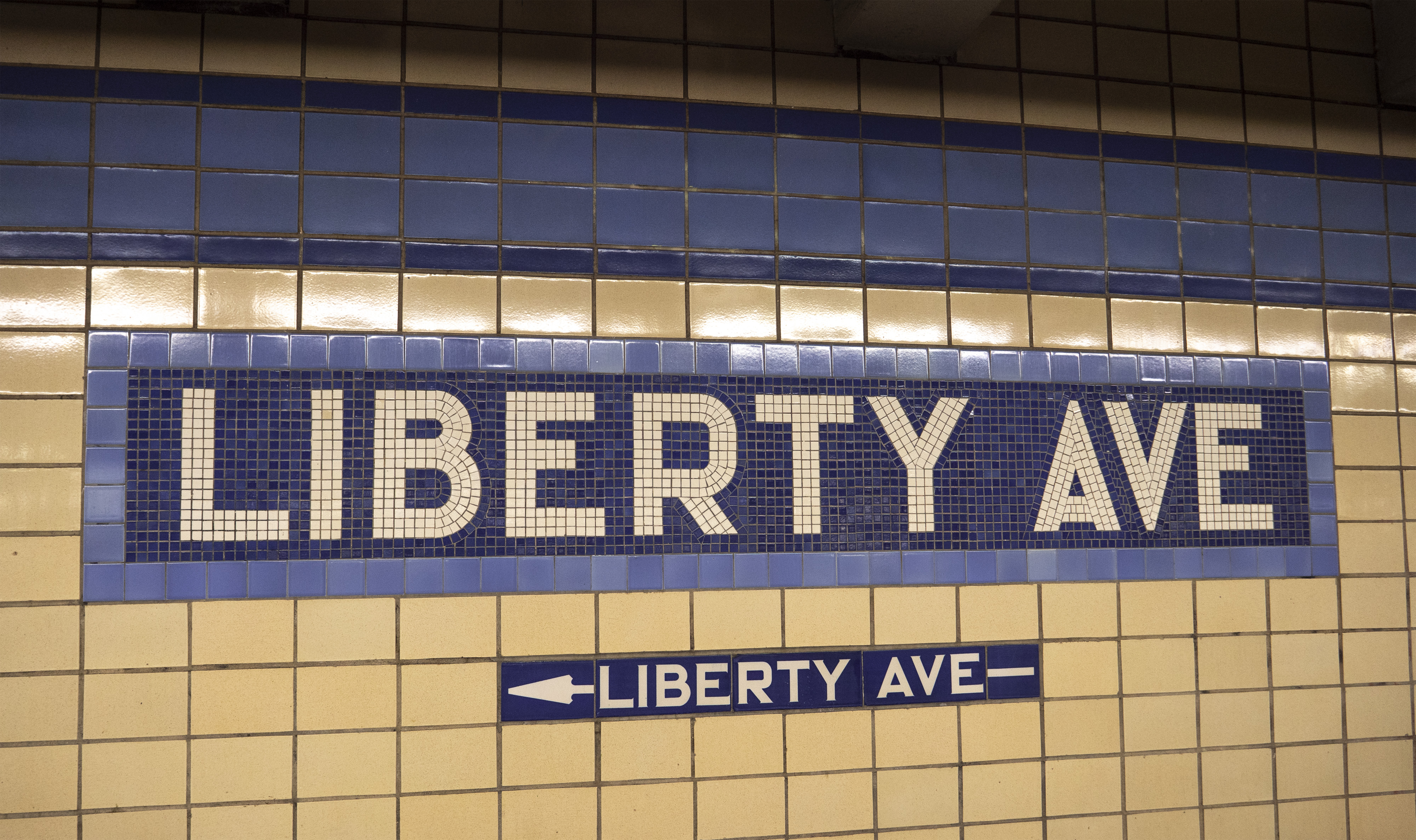
Mosaic name tablet

This underground station has two side platforms and four tracks. The C train stops here at all times except late nights, while the A serves the station at night and uses the center express tracks to bypass the station during daytime hours. The station is between Van Siclen Avenue to the east (railroad south) and Broadway Junction to the west (railroad north). On alternating columns separating the local and express tracks there are signs that read "LIBERTY AVE" in black on white.

Both platform walls have a periwinkle trim line with a dark periwinkle border and mosaic name tablets reading "LIBERTY AVE." in white sans-serif lettering on a dark periwinkle background and periwinkle border. Small tile captions reading "LIBERTY" in white lettering on dark periwinkle run under the trim line, and directional signs in the same style point towards the exit and are present under some of the name tablets. The walls have no ads, and there are no columns exempting a few in the recesses where the stairs are. There used to be wide areas under the stairs but they are now used for storage.

=== Exits ===
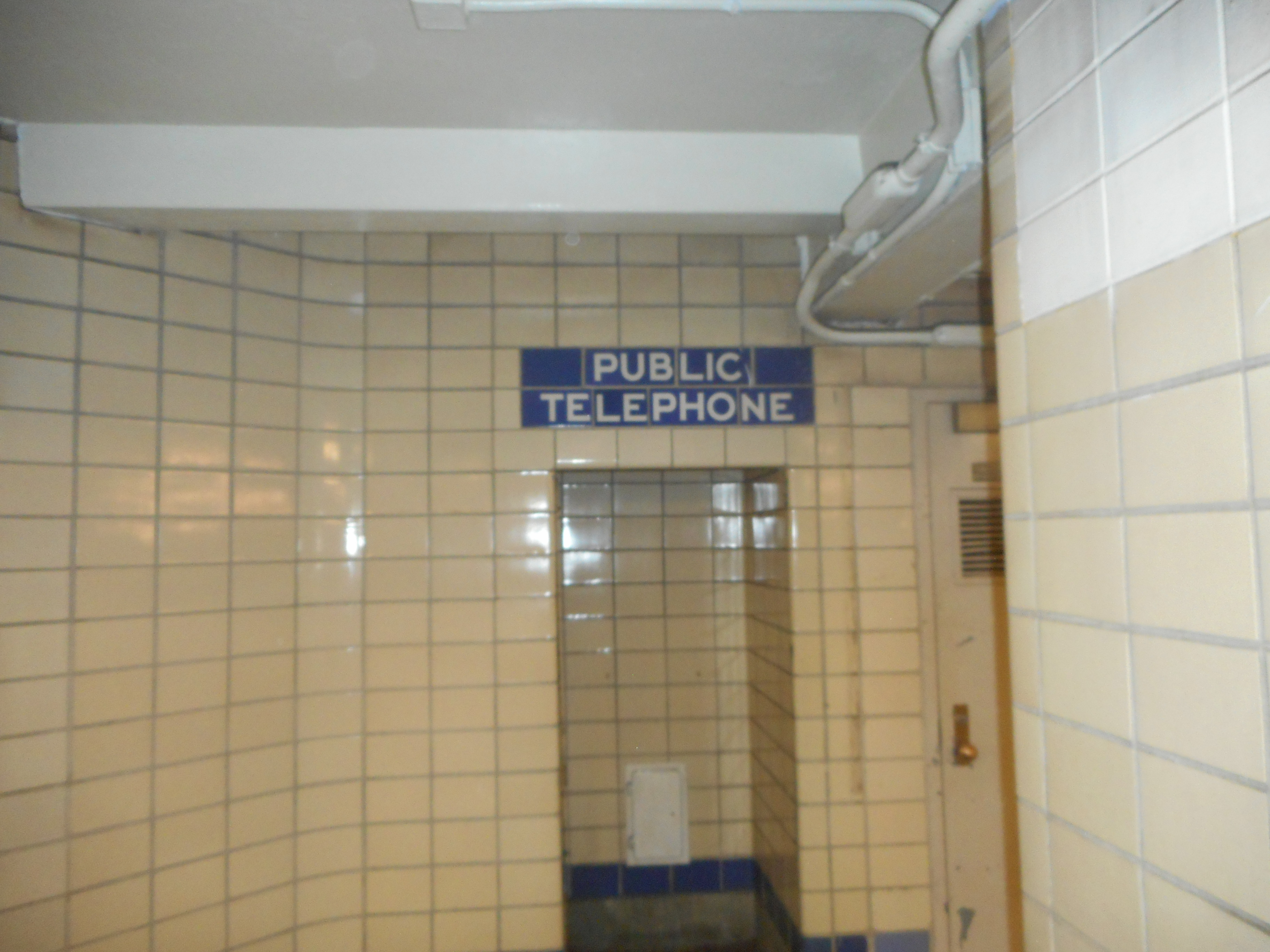
Location of former phone booth

The exit is in the center with two stairways from each platform to a mezzanine above the platforms. The exits from the mezzanine lead to all four corners of Liberty and Pennsylvania Avenues. The B20 and B83 bus routes stop outside the station.

Since the station was completed a decade later than most stations on the Fulton Street Line, the station has a different tiling scheme and the mezzanine is much narrower, and is only above the center of the station. In the mezzanine, there are old signs that indicate "TO BORO HALL AND MANHATTAN" and "TO RICHMOND HILL AND LEFFERTS BLVD". There are also alcoves marked with the text "PUBLIC TELEPHONE", as phone booths were originally installed in the station; the alcoves are now empty since the phones have been removed. Free crossovers can be made between directions in the mezzanine. At the southern end of the mezzanine, a fence separates the paid and free areas of the station, with a bank of three turnstiles. The station's token booth is directly opposite the turnstile bank.

== Ridership ==
In 2018, the station had 839,241 boardings, making it the 374th most used station in the 423-station system. This amounted to an average of 2,754 passengers per weekday.
