= Van Siclen Avenue station (BMT Fulton Street Line) =

Van Siclen Avenue
- Former New York City Subway station

Station statistics
- Address: Pitkin Avenue & Van Siclen Avenue; Brooklyn, NY 11207
- Borough: Brooklyn
- Locale: East New York
- Coordinates: 40.672726°N 73.890348°W
- Division: B (BMT)
- Line: BMT Fulton Street Line
- Services: None
- Structure: Elevated
- Platforms: 2 side platforms
- Tracks: 2

Other information
- Opened: November 18, 1889; 135 years ago
- Closed: April 26, 1956; 69 years ago

Station succession
- Next west: Pennsylvania Avenue
- Next east: Linwood Street
Location

Street map
Station service legend
Symbol	Description
Stops all times	Stops in station at all times
Stops all times except late nights	Stops all times except late nights
Stops late nights only	Stops late nights only
Stops late nights and weekends	Stops late nights and weekends only
Stops weekdays during the day	Stops weekdays during the day
Stops weekends during the day	Stops weekends during the day
Stops all times except rush hours in the peak direction	Stops all times except rush hours in the peak direction
Stops all times except weekdays in the peak direction	Stops all times except weekdays in the peak direction
Stops daily except rush hours in the peak direction	Stops all times except nights and rush hours in the peak direction
Stops rush hours only	Stops rush hours only
Stops rush hours in the peak direction only	Stops rush hours in the peak direction only
Station closed	Station is closed
(Details about time periods)

The Van Siclen Avenue station was a station on the demolished BMT Fulton Street Line in Brooklyn, New York City. It had 2 tracks and 2 side platforms. It was served by trains of the BMT Fulton Street Line. The station was built on November 18, 1889, and was the eastern terminus of the line until it was expanded to Linwood Street in February 1892, and Montauk Avenue a month later. The next stop to the east was Linwood Street. The next stop to the west was Pennsylvania Avenue. On November 28, 1948, the Independent Subway System opened the underground Van Siclen Avenue Subway station as an extension of the IND Fulton Street Line directly underneath the el station after years of war-time construction delays. This station rendered the elevated station obsolete, and it closed on April 26, 1956.
