= Pitkin Avenue =

Road in New York City

- Intersection of Cross Bay Boulevard and Pitkin Avenue
- Interactive map of Pitkin Avenue
- Owner: City of New York
- Maintained by: NYCDOT
- Length: 4.6 mi (7.4 km)
- Location: Brooklyn and Queens, New York City
- Coordinates: 40.6719368921202°N 73.89588020471987°W
- West end: Eastern Parkway in Brownsville, Brooklyn
- East end: Aqueduct Road in Ozone Park, Queens

Pitkin Avenue is a major east-west thoroughfare in the New York City boroughs of Brooklyn and Queens. It runs from eastern Brooklyn to Queens, running through the neighborhoods of Brownsville, East New York, and Ozone Park.

== History ==
=== Naming and early development ===
Pitkin Avenue is named after John R. Pitkin (1794–1874), a Connecticut-born merchant and land developer. In 1835, Pitkin purchased farmland in the area then known as New Lots and began developing a settlement he called East New York. He also established a shoe factory near the present-day intersection of Williams Street and Pitkin Avenue. His development plans were affected by the Panic of 1837, which forced him to sell much of his property.

In May 1897, the New York City Council renamed the street Broadway in Pitkin's honor.

=== Commercial development in Brownsville ===
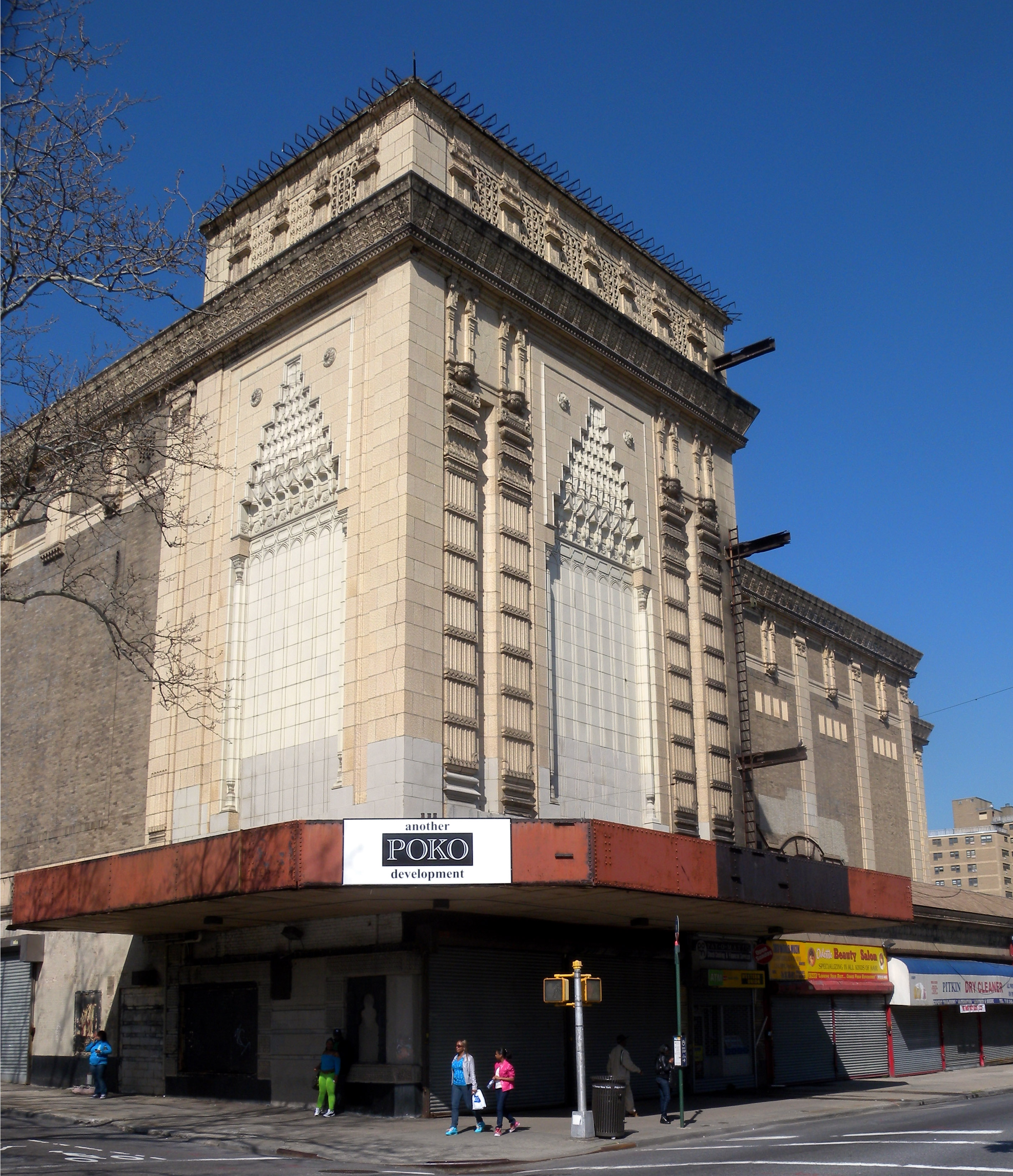
Facade of Loew's Pitkin Theatre

During the early 20th century, Pitkin Avenue became a major commercial thoroughfare in Brownsville. The neighborhood experienced substantial population growth during this period, particularly as Jewish immigrants settled in the area.

The avenue's commercial district included department stores, furniture shops, food retailers, and entertainment venues. The Loew's Pitkin Theatre, which opened in 1929, was a notable building in the neighborhood.

Pitkin Avenue declined during the mid-to-late 20th century amid changes in the neighborhood's population and economic conditions.

=== Business improvement and redevelopment ===
The Pitkin Avenue Business Improvement District (BID) was established in 1993. Its programs have included sanitation, security, streetscape improvements, business promotion, and efforts to strengthen the commercial district's identity in Brownsville.

== Transportation ==
Pitkin Avenue is served by four stations on the New York City Subway's IND Fulton Street Line (A and C trains): Grant Avenue, Euclid Avenue, Shepherd Avenue, and Van Siclen Avenue. In addition, multiple MTA buses run on Pitkin Avenue:

- The Bedford–Stuyvesant-bound B7 runs a section from Saratoga Avenue to Thomas S Boyland Street.
- The B12 runs between Howard Avenue and Rockaway Avenue.
- The B14 serves a section between Howard Avenue and Mother Gaston Boulevard.
- Jamaica Bus Terminal-bound Q8 buses run from Logan Street to Forbell Street, while Gateway Center-bound buses run from Grant Avenue to Euclid Avenue.
- The Q112 operates between Euclid Avenue to 84th Street.
