= Van Siclen Avenue station (IND Fulton Street Line) =

New York City Subway station in Brooklyn

Van Siclen Avenue
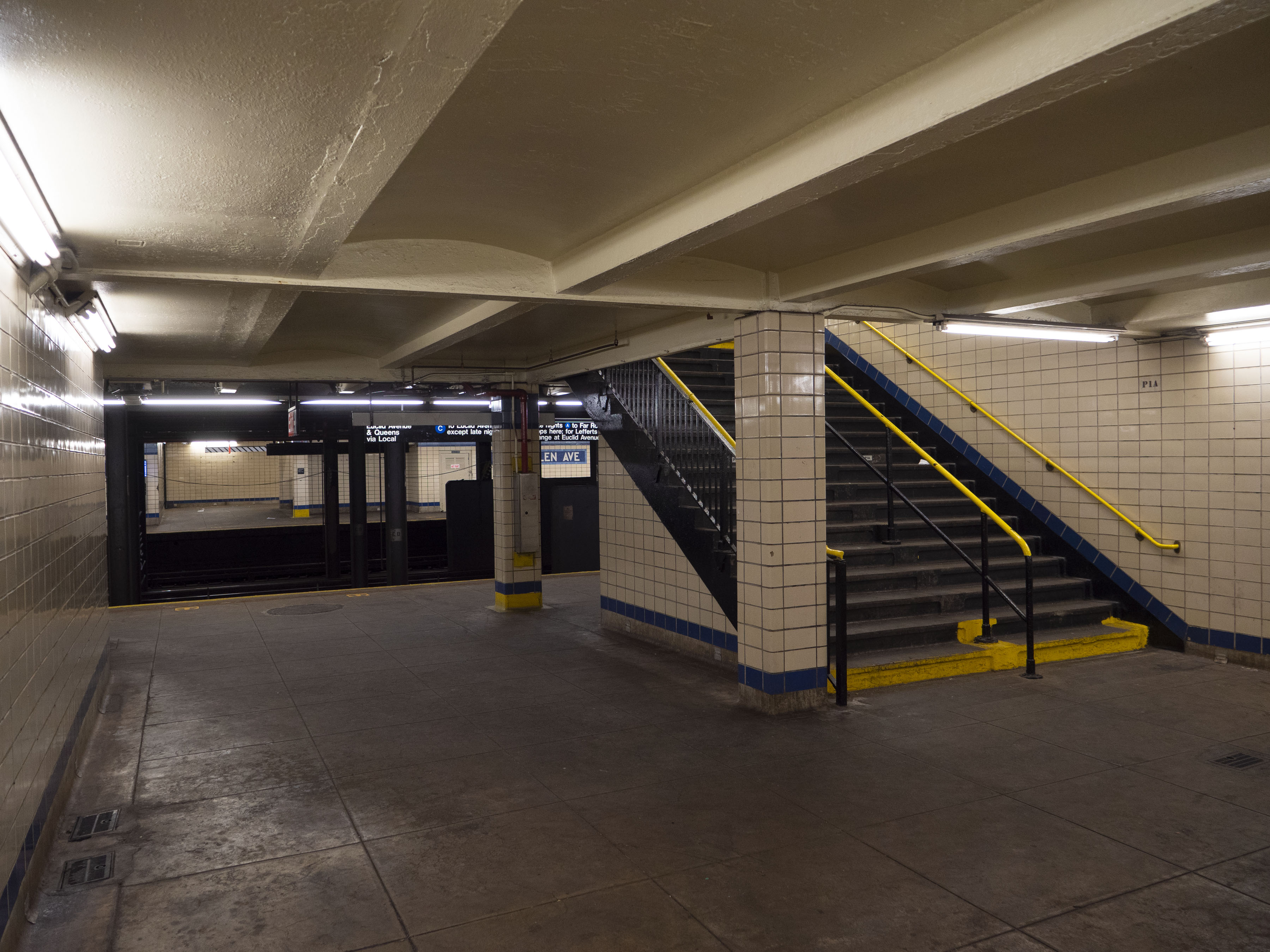
- View across tracks from southbound stair area

Station statistics
- Address: Van Siclen Avenue & Pitkin Avenue; Brooklyn, New York
- Borough: Brooklyn
- Locale: East New York
- Coordinates: 40.672697°N 73.890266°W
- Division: B (IND)
- Line: IND Fulton Street Line
- Services: A (late nights); C (all except late nights)
- Structure: Underground
- Platforms: 2 side platforms
- Tracks: 4

Other information
- Opened: November 28, 1948; 77 years ago
- Accessible: No; planned

Traffic
- 2025: 658,478 ▲19.2%
- Rank: 362 out of 423
Services
Preceding station	New York City Subway	Following station
Liberty Avenue A C toward 168th Street	Local	Shepherd Avenue A C toward Euclid Avenue
Location
Location within New York City Subway
Location within New York City
Location within New York
Track layout
Street map
Station service legend
Symbol	Description
Stops all times except late nights	Stops all times except late nights
Stops late nights only	Stops late nights only

The Van Siclen Avenue station is a local station on the IND Fulton Street Line of the New York City Subway. Located at the intersection of Van Siclen and Pitkin Avenues in the East New York neighborhood of Brooklyn, it is served by the C train at all times except late nights, when the A train takes over service.

Construction on the Van Siclen Avenue station started in 1938 as part of a four-station extension of the Fulton Street subway eastward under Pitkin Avenue toward Queens. Work was delayed by funding problems due to World War II, even though the stations were mostly complete. Construction resumed on the extension of the Fulton Street Line in November 1946, and this part of the Fulton Street Line opened in 1948. The extension of the Fulton Street subway replaced the Fulton Street elevated line, which closed afterward.

== History ==
Van Siclen Avenue was part of a four-station extension of the Fulton Street subway along Pitkin Avenue, past its original planned terminus at Broadway Junction. The Fulton Street subway was the city-owned Independent System (IND)'s main line from Downtown Brooklyn to southern Queens.

Further construction past the line's initial terminal at Rockaway Avenue was delayed by funding problems due to the Great Depression in the 1930s. This was temporarily solved by federal Works Progress Administration funding starting in 1936. The portion continuing from east of Rockaway Avenue along Pennsylvania and Pitkin Avenues to Crystal Street, including the Van Siclen Avenue station, began construction in 1938. The progress lasted only a few years, as all work on the last portions in Brooklyn was stopped by December 1942 shortly after the United States entered World War II due to material shortages, with Broadway−East New York complete but not in operation due to lack of signal equipment, and the remaining stations to Euclid Avenue as unfinished shells. At the time, work on the section that included the Van Siclen Avenue station was more than 99% complete, but vital equipment had yet to be installed, precluding its opening.

Construction resumed on the extension of the Fulton Street Line in November 1946, following the conclusion of the war and the allocation of funds obtained by Mayor William O'Dwyer. After several test runs, the station opened to the public in the early morning of November 28, 1948, along with the rest of the line to Euclid Avenue. The cost of the extension was about $46.5 million. Because Van Siclen Avenue and three other stations were completed later than the rest of the line, they received different design features than other IND stations, including different wall tiles and fluorescent lighting. It later became the replacement for the elevated BMT Fulton Street Line's Van Siclen Avenue station, which closed on April 26, 1956 when the connection to the eastern Fulton elevated was opened.

Under the 2015–2019 Metropolitan Transportation Authority Capital Program, the station, along with thirty other New York City Subway stations, was slated to undergo a complete overhaul and would have been entirely closed for up to six months. Updates would have include cellular service, Wi-Fi, charging stations, and improved signage and station lighting. However, most of these renovations were deferred until the 2020–2024 Capital Program due to a lack of funding.

As part of its 2025–2029 Capital Program, the MTA has proposed making the station wheelchair-accessible in compliance with the Americans with Disabilities Act of 1990.

== Station layout ==
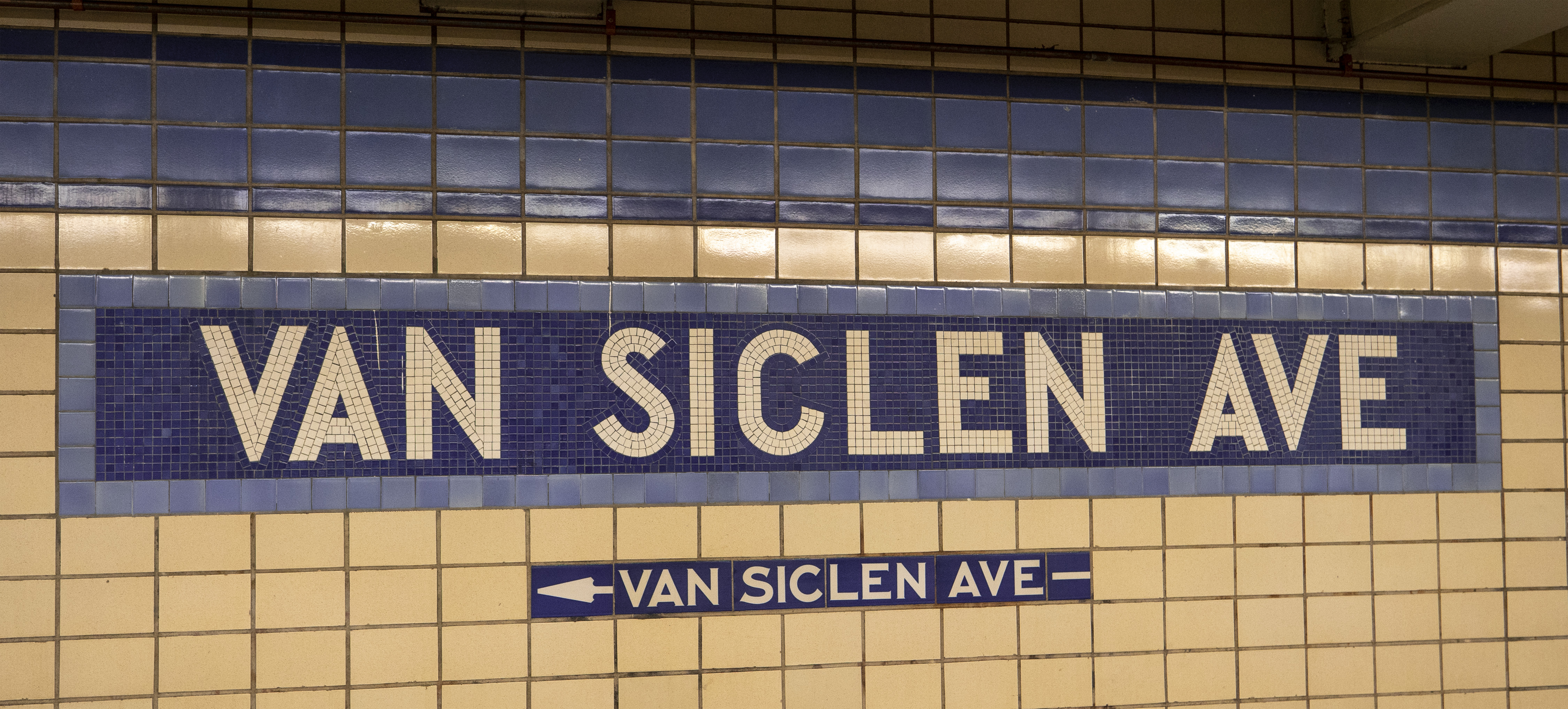
Mosaic name tablet

This underground station has two side platforms and four tracks. The C train stops here at all times except late nights, while the A serves the station at night and uses the center express tracks to bypass the station during daytime hours. The station is between Shepherd Avenue to the east (railroad south) and Liberty Avenue to the west (railroad north).

Both platform walls have a periwinkle trim line with a dark periwinkle border and mosaic name tablets reading "VAN SICLEN AVE." in white sans-serif lettering on a dark periwinkle background and periwinkle border. Small tile captions reading "VAN SICLEN" in white lettering on dark periwinkle run under the trim line, and directional signs in the same style are present under some of the name tablets. The walls have no ads, and there are no columns excepting a few in the recesses where the stairs are.

=== Exits ===
There is a crossover and a single, double wide stairway from each platform to the mezzanine. Outside of fare control, exits lead to all four corners of Pitkin Avenue and Van Siclen Avenue.
