= John F. Kennedy (disambiguation) =

John F. Kennedy (1917–1963) was the 35th president of the United States from 1961 to 1963.

John F. Kennedy may also refer to:

== People ==
- John F. Kennedy Jr. (1960–1999), son of John F. Kennedy
- John F. Kennedy (Georgia politician) (born 1965), member of the Georgia State Senate
- John Fitzgerald Kennedy, man convicted of the murders of Thomas and Jackie Hawks
- John Francis Kennedy (disambiguation), several people

== Transportation-related ==
- J.F. Kennedy, terminal underground station on Line A in Rennes, Brittany, France
- JFK/UMass station, station on the MBTA Red Line in Boston, Massachusetts
- John F. Kennedy Boulevard or Kennedy Boulevard may refer to:
  - John F. Kennedy Boulevard (Tampa, Florida), a major east–west corridor in Tampa, Florida
  - John F. Kennedy Boulevard (Houston, Texas), a major north-south boulevard in Houston, Texas.
  - County Route 501 (New Jersey) in Hudson County, New Jersey
  - County Route 625 (Cape May County, New Jersey) in Sea Isle City, New Jersey
  - A section of westbound Pennsylvania Route 3 in Center City, Philadelphia
  - The main thoroughfare in Managua, Nicaragua, which is also known as Carretera Norte.
  - John F. Kennedy Boulevard Bridge, which crosses the Schuylkill River in Philadelphia, Pennsylvania
- John F. Kennedy Expressway, a major expressway in Chicago, Illinois
- John F. Kennedy International Airport, New York City, New York, United States
- John F. Kennedy Memorial Airport, Ashland County, Wisconsin, United States
- John F. Kennedy Memorial Bridge, a bridge that crosses the Ohio River between Kentucky and Indiana
- John F. Kennedy Memorial Causeway, a bridge located in Corpus Christi, Texas
- John F. Kennedy Memorial Highway or JFK Memorial Highway may refer to:
  - John F. Kennedy Memorial Highway (Maryland), a section of Interstate 95 in Maryland
  - Delaware Turnpike, a tolled section of Interstate 95 in Delaware
  - Massachusetts Route 18, a continuation of John F. Kennedy Memorial Highway in New Bedford, Massachusetts
  - Interstate 25 in Colorado, a section of Interstate 25 in Pueblo County
- MV John F. Kennedy, Staten Island Ferry

== Schools ==
- John F. Kennedy College, Nebraska, United States
- John F. Kennedy High School (disambiguation)
- John F. Kennedy Elementary School (disambiguation)
- John F Kennedy Catholic School, England

== Other uses ==
- USS John F. Kennedy, two United States Navy ships
- John Fitzgerald Kennedy National Historic Site, Brookline, Massachusetts
- John F. Kennedy Presidential Library and Museum, Boston, Massachusetts
- John F. Kennedy: Years of Lightning, Day of Drums, a 1966 film
- John F. Kennedy Stadium (disambiguation)
- John F Kennedy (horse), an Irish racehorse
- List of memorials to John F. Kennedy, a list of things named after the president

== See also ==
- John Kennedy (disambiguation)
- JFK (disambiguation)
