= JFK Airport (disambiguation) =

JFK Airport may refer to:

- John F. Kennedy International Airport, an international airport located in Queens County, on Long Island, in southeastern New York City, IATA code JFK
- John F. Kennedy Memorial Airport, an airport located southwest of the Ashland, Ashland County, Wisconsin, IATA code ASX
- El Alto International Airport, an airport located southwest of La Paz, Bolivia, IATA code LPB, officially known as John F. Kennedy until 1999 when its name was changed

== New York City Subway stations ==
- Sutphin Boulevard – Archer Avenue – JFK Airport (New York City Subway), a two level station complex in the Jamaica neighborhood of Queens; serving the E, J, and Z trains
- Howard Beach – JFK Airport (IND Rockaway Line), a station at 159th Avenue & 103rd Street in the Howard Beach neighborhood of Queens; serving the A train
