= JFK (disambiguation) =

JFK, or John Fitzgerald Kennedy (1917–1963), was the 35th president of the United States from 1961 to 1963.

JFK may also refer to:

== Transportation ==
- John F. Kennedy International Airport, United States (IATA code: JFK)
  - Howard Beach–JFK Airport station
  - Sutphin Boulevard–Archer Avenue–JFK Airport station
- John F. Kennedy Memorial Airport, or JFK Memorial Airport, Ashland, Wisconsin, United States
- JFK/UMass station, Boston, Massachusetts, United States
- JFK Express, a former New York City Subway service

== Arts and entertainment ==
- JFK (film), 1991
  - JFK (soundtrack), 1992
- JFK (opera), 2016
- JFK (Clone High), a fictional character
- "JFK", a song by Azealia Banks from the 2014 album Broke with Expensive Taste
- "[JFK]", a song by Muse from the 2015 album Drones

== Education ==
- JFK International School, Saanen, Switzerland
- JFK University, Pleasant Hill, California, United States
- JFK College, Wahoo, Nebraska, United States

== Other uses ==
- JFK Medical Center (disambiguation)

== See also ==
- John F. Kennedy (disambiguation)
- KJFK (disambiguation), including stations in zone K called JFK
- WJFK (disambiguation), including stations in zone W called JFK
- JFK Reloaded, a 2004 video game
- JFK Revisited: Through the Looking Glass, a 2021 documentary about John F. Kennedy's assassination
