= 121st Street station (BMT Jamaica Line) =

New York City Subway station in Queens

121 Street
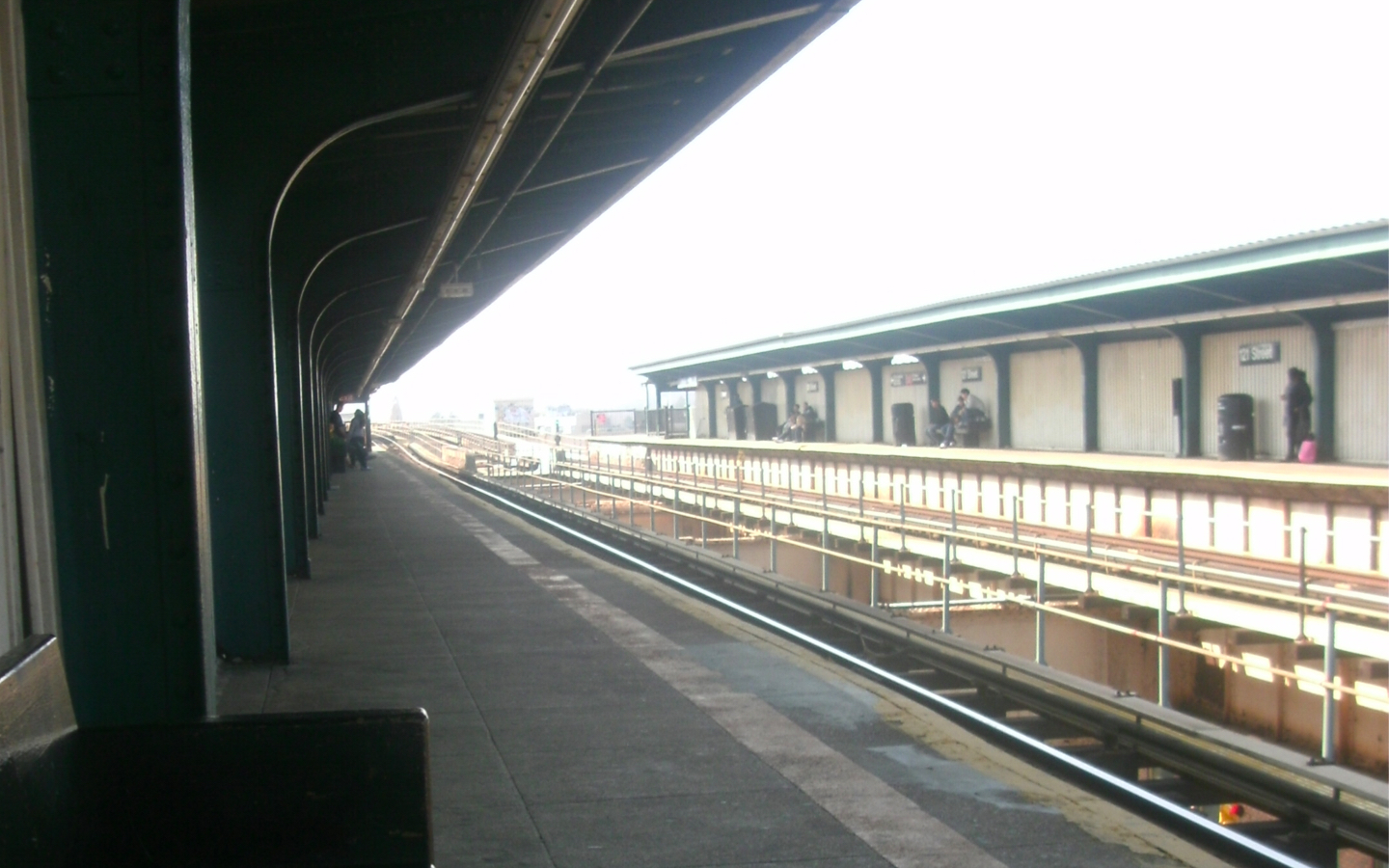
- Northbound platform prior to renovation

Station statistics
- Address: 121st Street and Jamaica Avenue; Queens, New York
- Borough: Queens
- Locale: Richmond Hill, Kew Gardens
- Coordinates: 40.700357°N 73.82894°W
- Division: B (BMT)
- Line: BMT Jamaica Line
- Services: J (all except rush hours, peak direction); Z (rush hours, peak direction)
- Transit: NYCT Bus: Q55, Q56; MTA Bus: Q10, Q80
- Structure: Elevated
- Platforms: 2 side platforms
- Tracks: 2

Other information
- Opened: July 3, 1918 (108 years ago)
- Accessible: No; planned

Traffic
- 2025: 524,477 ▲12.5%
- Rank: 390 out of 423
Services
Preceding station	New York City Subway	Following station
104th Street Z skip-stop	J/Z (New York City Subway service)	Sutphin Boulevard–Archer Avenue–JFK Airport J Z toward Jamaica Center–York College
111th Street J toward Broad Street	J/Z (New York City Subway service)	Sutphin Boulevard–Archer Avenue–JFK Airport J Z toward Jamaica Center–York College
Non-revenue services and lines
Preceding station	New York City Subway	Following station
	no service	Metropolitan Avenue demolished
Location
Location within New York City Subway
Location within New York City
Location within New York
Track layout
Street map
Station service legend
Symbol	Description
Stops all times except rush hours in the peak direction	Stops all times except rush hours in the peak direction
Stops rush hours in the peak direction only	Stops rush hours in the peak direction only
Stops all times	Stops all times

The 121st Street station is a skip-stop station on the elevated BMT Jamaica Line of the New York City Subway. Located at the intersection of 121st Street and Jamaica Avenue in Richmond Hill and Kew Gardens, Queens, it is served by the J train at all times except rush hours in the peak direction, when the Z train takes over service.

== History ==
This station was opened on July 3, 1918, by the Brooklyn Union Elevated Railroad, an affiliate of the Brooklyn Rapid Transit Company.

During construction of the Archer Avenue Line, the Jamaica Avenue elevated line was cut back past 121st Street on April 15, 1985. The Q49 bus, which replaced Jamaica elevated service running from the line's previous terminal of Queens Boulevard to the line's original terminal at 168th Street, was extended to 121st Street. Until the opening of the Archer Avenue Line in 1988, J trains alternately terminated at 111th Street and 121st Street, with peak period headways to 121st Street being ten minutes. This temporary service pattern was originally slated to be in effect for six or seven months. Construction on the ramps to Archer Avenue was completed in November 1987, but since the tunnels were not ready for service until 1988, a double crossover east (railroad north) of the station was installed while the ramps were used for storage. The Archer Avenue Line opened on December 11, 1988, and service was extended from 121st Street to Jamaica Center–Parsons/Archer (now known as Jamaica Center-York College).

The Manhattan-bound platform closed for renovations on February 6, 2017, and reopened on December 22, 2017, delayed from the summer. The Jamaica Center-bound platform closed for renovations on February 12, 2018, and reopened on November 14, 2018, delayed from its planned reopening in the summer. As part of its 2025–2029 Capital Program, the MTA has proposed making the station wheelchair-accessible in compliance with the Americans with Disabilities Act of 1990.

== Station layout ==
This elevated station has two tracks and two side platforms, with space for a center express track that was never added. The station has beige windscreens and green canopies. This is the easternmost station on the Jamaica Line, east of here, trains go underground to the BMT Archer Avenue Line.

=== Exits ===
There are two exits. The full-time exit is at the west (railroad south) end of the station. One staircase from each platform leads to the mezzanine beneath the tracks. Outside of fare control, a pair of staircases lead down to either side of Jamaica Avenue on the west side of 121st Street.

There is an additional unstaffed exit at the east (railroad north) end of the station leading to the west side of 123rd Street. This exit is split in half due to the closed-off station house beneath the tracks. A single staircase from each platform leads to a landing that contains a full-height HEET turnstile before the street stairs.
