= RFK (disambiguation) =

Robert F. Kennedy (1925–1968) was an American attorney general and senator.

RFK or rfk may also refer to:

== People ==
- Robert F. Kennedy Jr. (born 1954), American lawyer, journalist, author, son of Robert F. Kennedy, and Secretary of Health and Human Services since 2025
- Robert F. Kennedy III (born 1984), American film director, son of Robert F. Kennedy Jr. and grandson of Robert F. Kennedy

== Arts, media and entertainment ==
- RFK (film), a 2002 television movie about Robert F. Kennedy
- RFK, a 2004 television documentary directed by David Grubin
- robotfindskitten (rfk), a computer game

== Other uses ==
- RFK Riga (Rīgas futbola klubs), a former Latvian football club
- River Free Kickers, the former name of association football club Fagiano Okayama
- Robert F. Kennedy Bridge, a complex of bridges and elevated expressway viaducts in New York City, US
- Robert F. Kennedy Memorial Stadium, Washington DC, US
- Roush Fenway Keselowski Racing (RFK Racing), a NASCAR team

== See also ==
- JFK (disambiguation)
