= KASX =

KASX may refer to:

- John F. Kennedy Memorial Airport (ICAO code KASX)
- KASX-LP, a defunct low-power television station (channel 22) formerly licensed to Sweetwater, Texas, United States
