= KJFK =

KJFK may refer to:

- KJFK (AM), a radio station (1490 AM) licensed to serve Austin, Texas, United States
- KJFK-FM, a radio station (96.3 FM) licensed to serve Llano, Texas
- KJFK-LP, a low-power radio station (101.9 FM) licensed to serve Hot Springs, Montana, United States; see List of radio stations in Montana
- KZTQ (AM), a radio station (1230 AM) licensed to serve Reno, Nevada, United States known as KJFK from 2005 to 2013
- KUTX, a radio station (98.9 FM) licensed to serve Leander, Texas, known as KJFK from 1996 to 2000
- KOSB, a radio station (105.1 FM) licensed to serve Perry, Oklahoma, United States known as KJFK from 1988 to 1993
- John F. Kennedy International Airport (ICAO: KJFK), a major airport in New York City

== See also ==
- JFK (disambiguation)
- WJFK (disambiguation)
