= Sutphin Boulevard station (BMT Jamaica Line) =

New York City Subway station in Queens (closed 1977)

Sutphin Boulevard
- Former New York City Subway station
- The station as it appeared around 1940, documented by the WPA tax photos

Station statistics
- Address: Jamaica Avenue and Sutphin Boulevard; Queens, New York 11435
- Borough: Queens
- Locale: Jamaica
- Coordinates: 40°42′6″N 73°48′28″W
- Division: B (BMT)
- Line: BMT Jamaica Line
- Services: None (demolished)
- Structure: Elevated
- Platforms: 2 side platforms
- Tracks: 2

Other information
- Opened: July 3, 1918; 108 years ago
- Closed: September 10, 1977; 49 years ago

Station succession
- Next north: 160th Street (demolished)
- Next south: Queens Boulevard (demolished)
Location
Location within New York City Subway
Location within New York City
Location within New York
Street map
Station service legend
Symbol	Description
Stops all times	Stops in station at all times
Stops all times except late nights	Stops all times except late nights
Stops late nights only	Stops late nights only
Stops late nights and weekends	Stops late nights and weekends only
Stops weekdays during the day	Stops weekdays during the day
Stops weekends during the day	Stops weekends during the day
Stops all times except rush hours in the peak direction	Stops all times except rush hours in the peak direction
Stops all times except weekdays in the peak direction	Stops all times except weekdays in the peak direction
Stops daily except rush hours in the peak direction	Stops all times except nights and rush hours in the peak direction
Stops rush hours only	Stops rush hours only
Stops rush hours in the peak direction only	Stops rush hours in the peak direction only
Station closed	Station is closed
(Details about time periods)

The Sutphin Boulevard station was a station on the demolished section of the BMT Jamaica Line in Queens, New York City.

== History ==
This station was built as part of the Dual Contracts. It opened on July 3, 1918, after the Atlantic Avenue Rapid Transit service was eliminated from Jamaica Station.

The station closed on September 10, 1977, with the Q49 bus replacing it until December 11, 1988, in anticipation of the Archer Avenue Subway, and due to political pressure in the area.

This station along with the 168th Street and 160th Street stations was demolished in 1979. It was replaced by the Sutphin Boulevard–Archer Avenue–JFK Airport station, which opened on December 11, 1988. Between the closing of the el station and its replacement subway station, the existing Sutphin Boulevard station, four blocks to the north on Hillside Avenue served as a temporary substitute.

== Station layout ==
It had two tracks and two side platforms, with space for a third track in the center. This station had provisions built in its structure to convert it into an express station, if the center third track was to be built. The other station on the line that had such provisions was the Woodhaven Boulevard station.

== Gallery ==
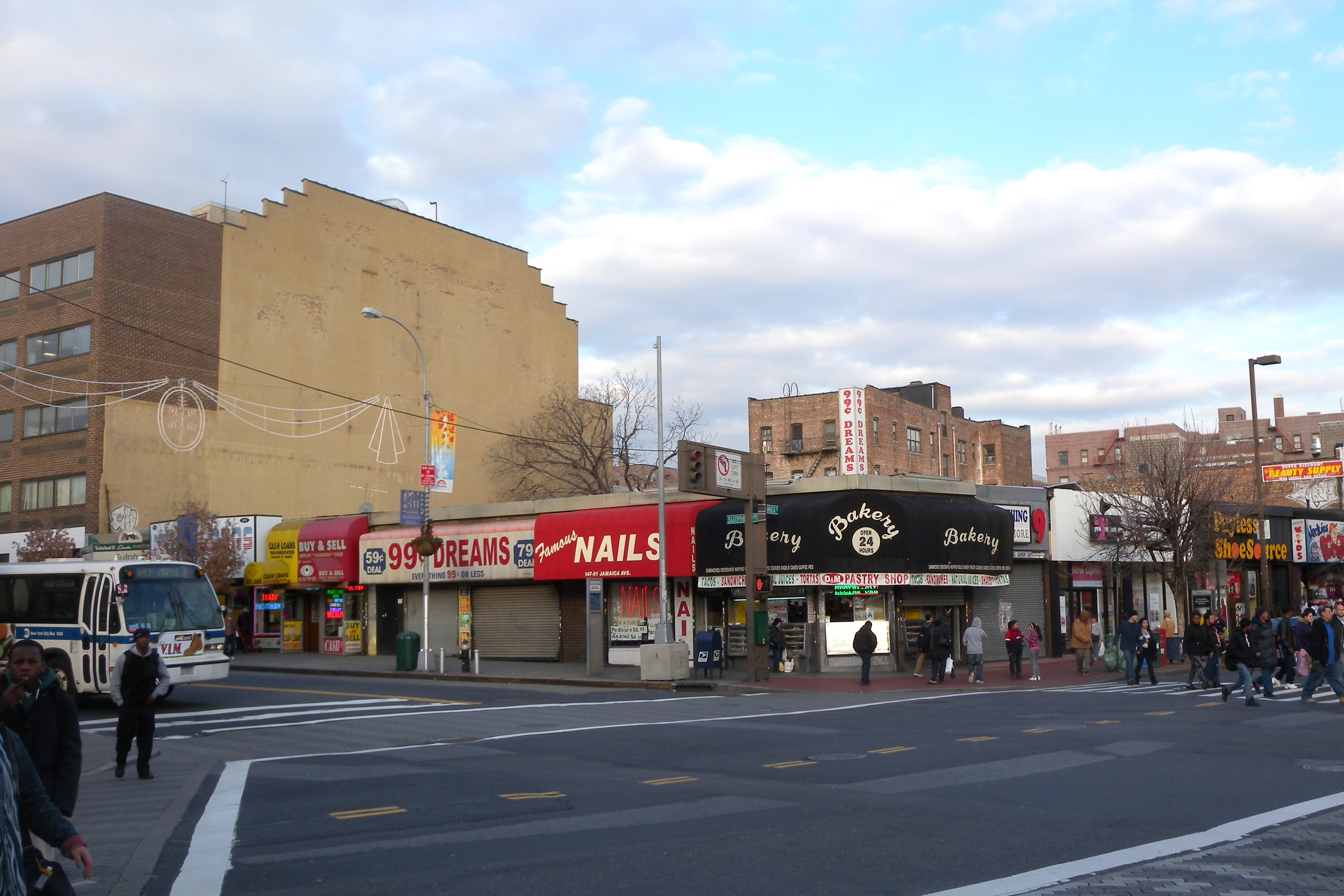
Site, 30 years after demolition

== See also ==
- Sutphin Boulevard station (IND Queens Boulevard Line)
- Sutphin Boulevard–Archer Avenue–JFK Airport station
