= John Francis Kennedy =

John Francis Kennedy may refer to:

- John Francis Kennedy (politician) (1905–1994), American politician
- John Kennedy (Australian musician) also known as John Francis Kennedy (born 1958), Australian musician
- John Kennedy (public servant) born as John Joseph Francis Kennedy (1884 – ?), Australian public servant

== See also ==
- John F. Kennedy (disambiguation)
