= WJFK =

WJFK may refer to:

- WJFK (AM), a radio station (1580 AM) licensed to serve Morningside, Maryland, United States
- WJFK-FM, a radio station (106.7 FM) licensed to serve Manassas, Virginia, United States
- WJZ (AM), a radio station (1300 AM) licensed to serve Baltimore, Maryland, which used the WJFK call sign from October 1991 to November 2008

== See also ==
- JFK (disambiguation)
- KJFK (disambiguation)
