= Jamaica–Van Wyck station =

New York City Subway station in Queens

Jamaica–Van Wyck
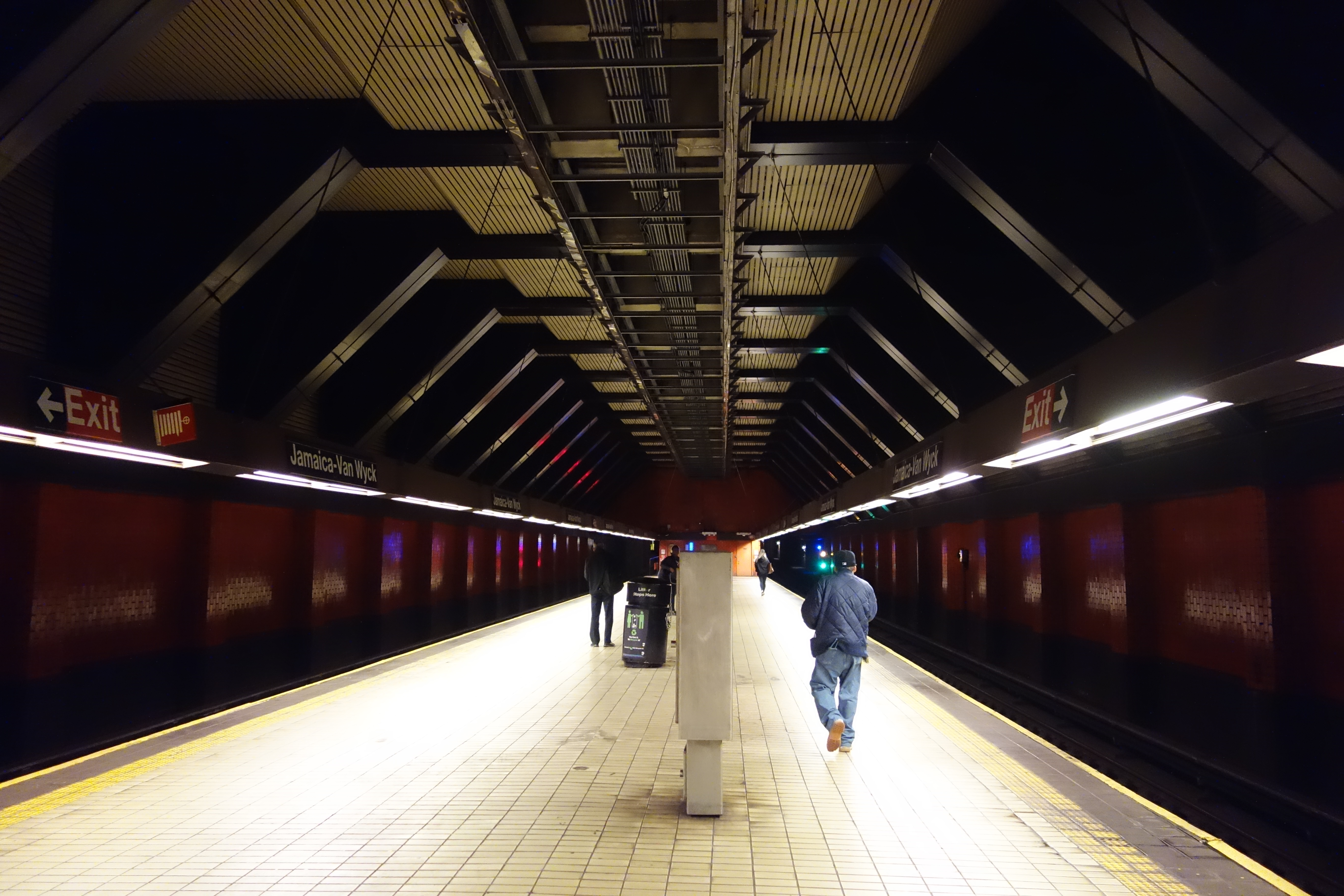
- Station platform

Station statistics
- Address: West side of Van Wyck Expressway between Metropolitan Avenue & 89th Avenue; Queens, New York
- Borough: Queens
- Locale: Jamaica, Richmond Hill
- Coordinates: 40.701905°N 73.81656°W
- Division: B (IND)
- Line: IND Archer Avenue Line
- Services: E (all times)
- Transit: NYCT Bus: Q20, Q24, Q54, Q56; MTA Bus: Q60
- Structure: Underground
- Platforms: 1 island platform
- Tracks: 2

Other information
- Opened: December 11, 1988; 37 years ago
- Accessible: Yes

Traffic
- 2025: 1,133,109 ▲7.9%
- Rank: 289 out of 423
Services
Preceding station	New York City Subway	Following station
Kew Gardens–Union Turnpike E toward World Trade Center	E (New York City Subway service)	Sutphin Boulevard–Archer Avenue–JFK Airport E toward Jamaica Center–York College
Briarwood E local	E (New York City Subway service)	Sutphin Boulevard–Archer Avenue–JFK Airport E toward Jamaica Center–York College
Location
Location within New York City Subway
Location within New York City
Location within New York
Track layout
Street map
Station service legend
Symbol	Description
Stops all times	Stops all times
Stops weekdays during the day	Stops weekdays during the day
Stops late nights and weekends	Stops late nights and weekends

The Jamaica–Van Wyck station (/væn ˈwɪk/ van WIK) is a station on the IND Archer Avenue Line of the New York City Subway, located on the west side of the Van Wyck Expressway between Metropolitan Avenue and 89th Avenue on the border of Jamaica and Richmond Hill, Queens. It is served by the E train at all times.

== History ==
=== Planning and opening ===
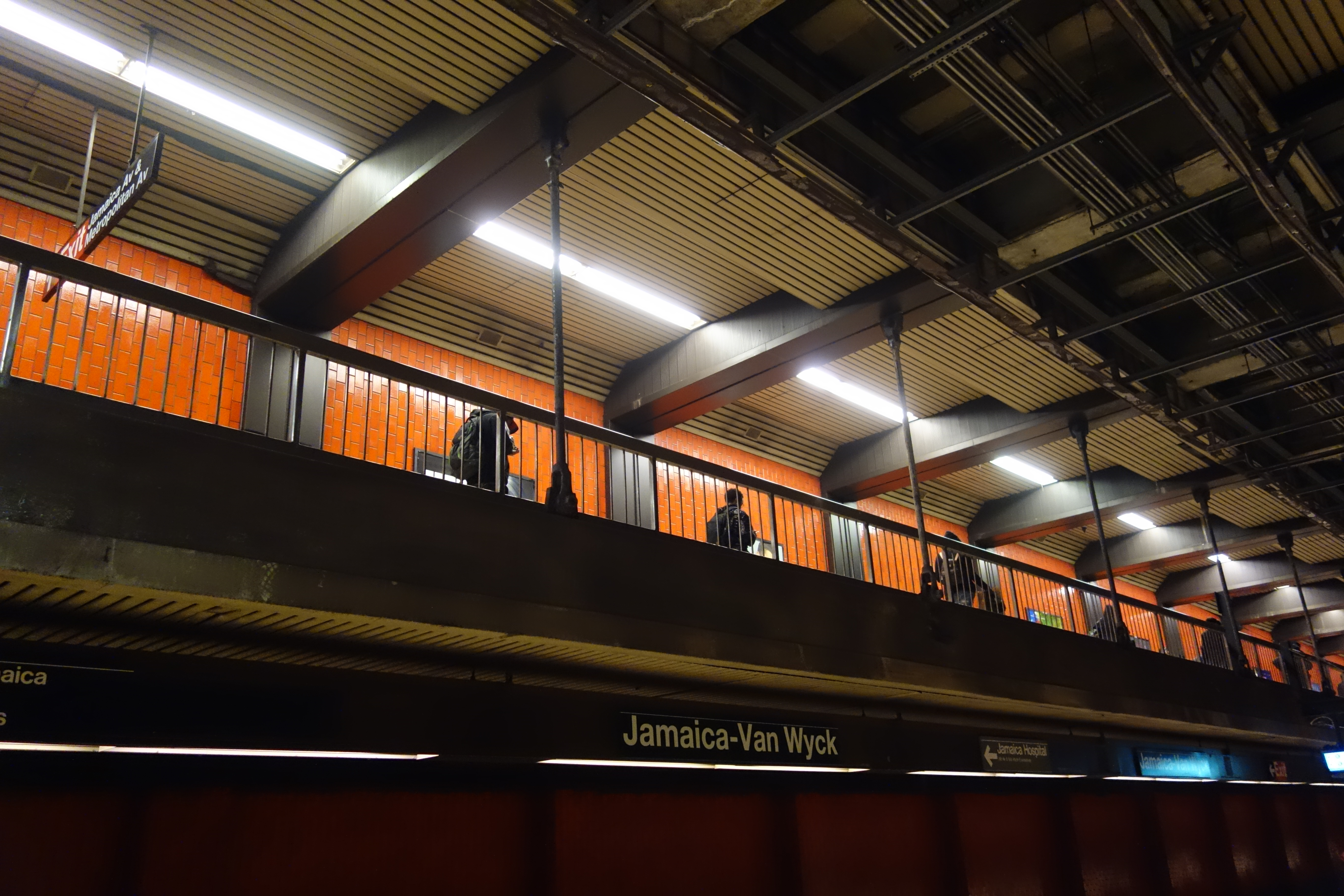
The station's mezzanine, located above the platform.

The plans for the Archer Avenue Lines emerged in the 1960s under the city and MTA's Program for Action. It was conceived as an expansion of IND Queens Boulevard Line service to a "Southeast Queens" line along the right-of-way of the Long Island Rail Road Atlantic Branch towards Locust Manor, and as a replacement for the dilapidated eastern portions of the elevated BMT Jamaica Line within the Jamaica business district. Business owners and residents sought removal of the structure. Both lines would meet at the double-decked line under Archer Avenue. The two-track spur from the Queens Boulevard Line would use the original Van Wyck Boulevard bellmouths. The IND line was to continue as a two-track line along the LIRR Atlantic Branch. It would have run through Locust Manor and Laurelton stations, with stops at Sutphin Boulevard, Parsons Boulevard (which was called Standard Place in planning documents), Linden Boulevard, Baisley Boulevard, and Springfield Boulevard.

Design on the station began on October 1, 1974, and was completed on August 18, 1982, by MLA/Brodsky. Construction on Section 7 of Route 131D, the Southeast Queens Line, which included the Jamaica–Van Wyck station started on October 17, 1979. At this point, the segment of the Archer Avenue Line under the Van Wyck Expressway had been completed. Because of the 1975 New York City fiscal crisis, the Archer Avenue Line was never fully built to Springfield Boulevard, and was instead truncated to Parsons Boulevard. The shortened version of the line contained three stations, including Jamaica–Van Wyck, and was 2 miles (3.2 km) long. Bids for the station project were received on December 3, 1982, and the project was awarded to Carlin Construction & Development Corporation for $12.781 million. Work on the station began on December 15, 1982. The station opened along with the rest of the Archer Avenue Line on December 11, 1988. It serves as the replacement for the former Metropolitan Avenue and Queens Boulevard stations of the BMT Jamaica Line.

=== Later years ===
To save energy, the MTA installed variable-speed escalators at Jamaica–Van Wyck and three other subway stations in August 2008, although not all of the escalators initially functioned as intended.

In 2020, the MTA announced that it would reconstruct the track and third rail on the IND Archer Avenue Line, which had become deteriorated. From September 19 to November 2, 2020, E service was cut back to Jamaica–Van Wyck, with a shuttle bus connecting to Sutphin Boulevard and Jamaica Center. The station was cleaned and repaired in 2024 as part of the MTA's Re-New-Vation program.

== Station layout ==
This underground station has two tracks and a 600-foot-long (180 m) island platform. As planned, the island platform was to be 25 feet (7.6 m) wide. The E stops here at all times. The next stop to the west is Kew Gardens–Union Turnpike on weekdays during the day and Briarwood at other times. The next stop to the east is Sutphin Boulevard–Archer Avenue–JFK Airport. As with other stations constructed as part of the Program for Action, the Jamaica–Van Wyck station contained technologically advanced features such as air-cooling, noise insulation, CCTV monitors, public announcement systems, electronic platform signage, and escalator and elevator entrances. This station has five escalators and two elevators.

The track walls are mostly orange. The mezzanine is suspended above the Jamaica-bound track via heavy cables linked to the station roof. On the Manhattan-bound side, the station walls contain spaces for skylights to allow natural sunlight in, but they are currently covered over.

North (railroad south) of the station, the tracks lead trains to the IND Queens Boulevard Line, where they either switch to the line's local or express tracks depending on the time of day.

=== Exits ===
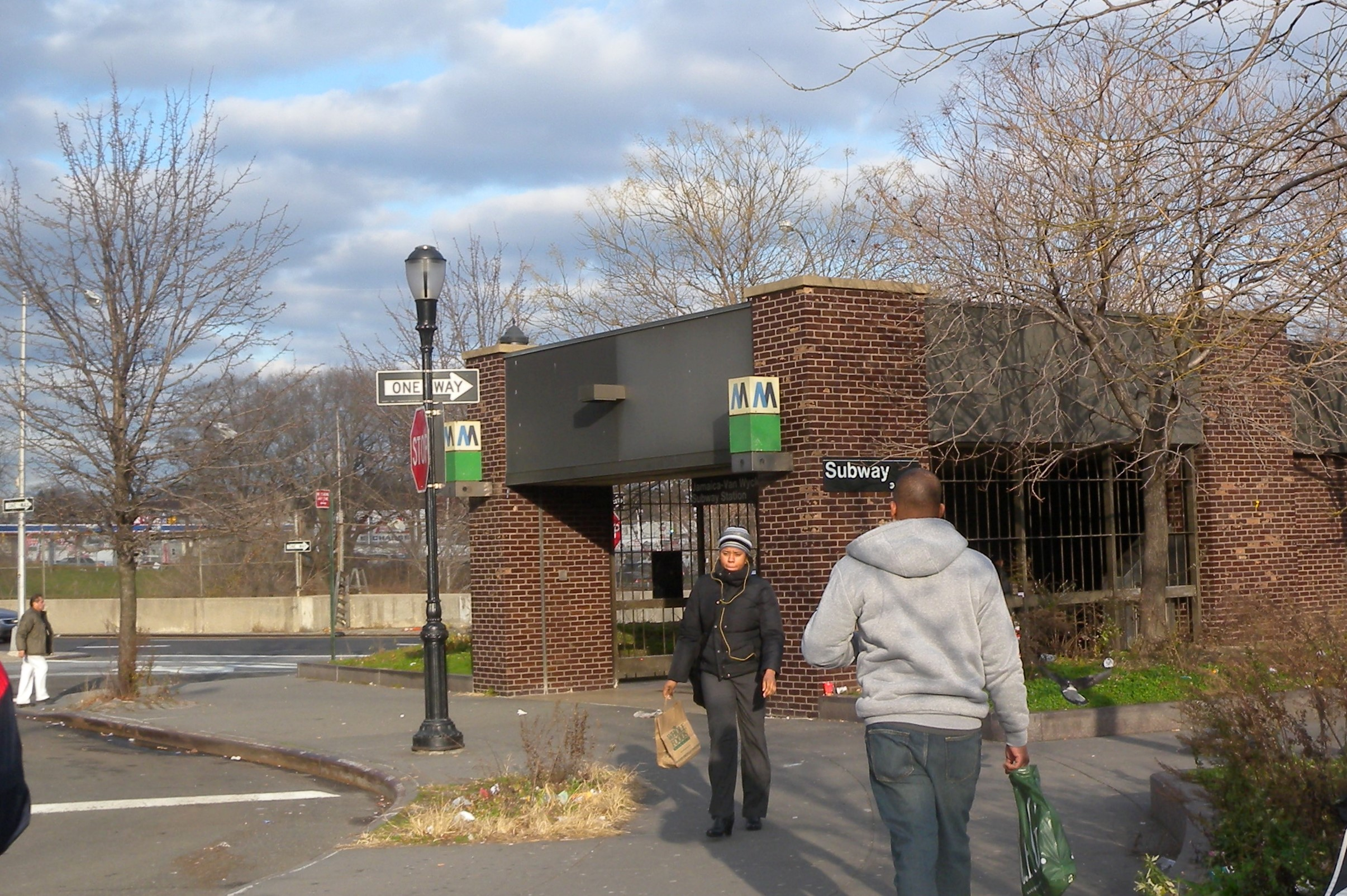
Metropolitan Avenue entrance photographed in 2011

The Jamaica–Van Wyck station has two entrances. One entrance is at the southwest corner of Van Wyck Expressway and 89th Avenue next to Jamaica Hospital Medical Center. This contains two escalators, an elevator, and one stair to street level. The other entrance is at Metropolitan Avenue and Jamaica Avenue, and contains one up-only escalator and a street stair. Two escalators and one staircase connect the platform with the mezzanine.
