= Metropolitan Avenue station (BMT Jamaica Line) =

New York City Subway station in Queens (closed 1985)

Metropolitan Avenue
- Former New York City Subway station
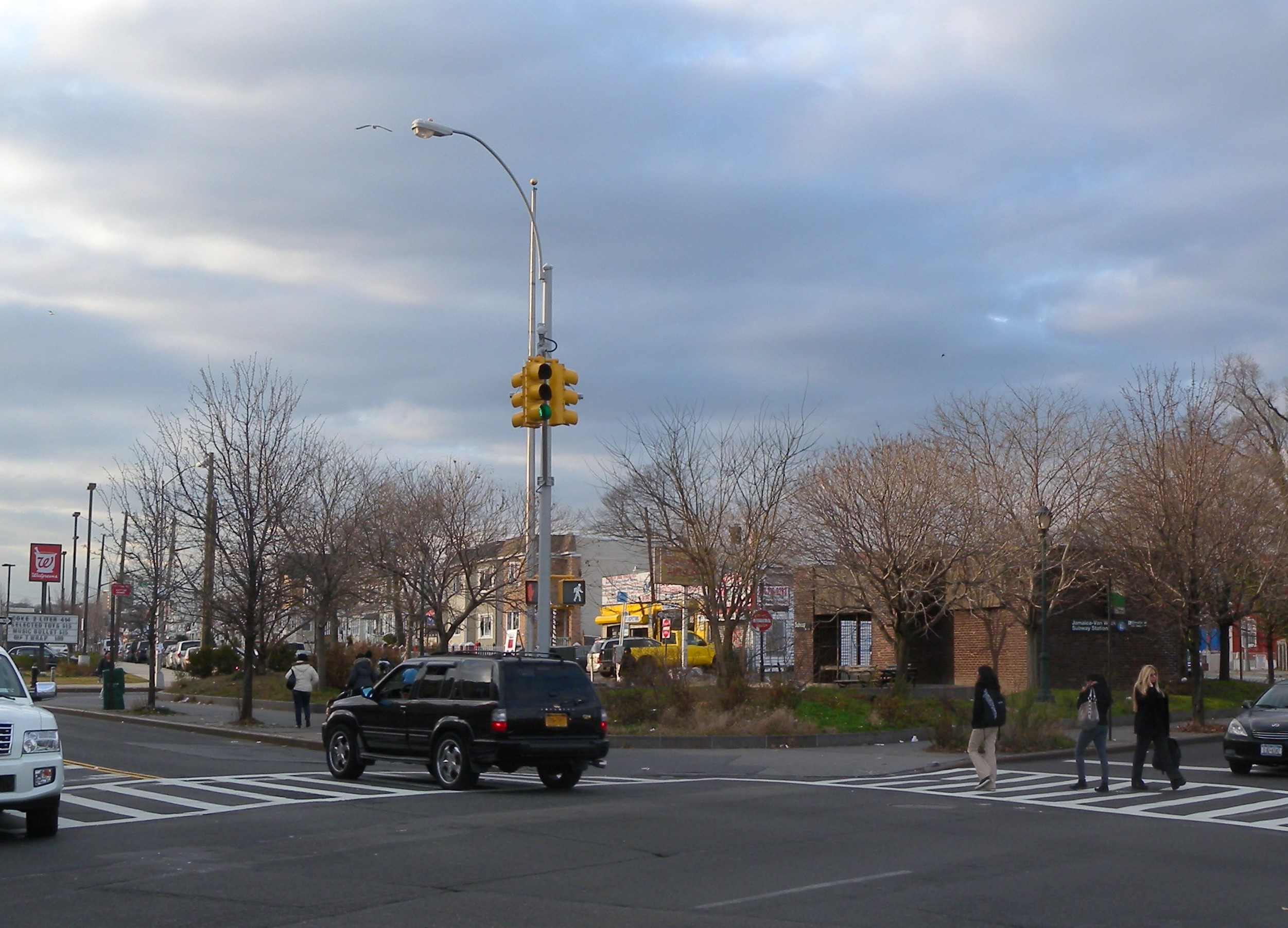
- Site, 20 years after demolition. The entrance to Jamaica - Van Wyck can be seen in the background.

Station statistics
- Address: Metropolitan Avenue and Jamaica Avenue; Queens, New York 11418
- Borough: Queens
- Locale: Richmond Hill
- Coordinates: 40°42′8.6″N 73°49′2″W
- Division: B (BMT)
- Line: BMT Jamaica Line
- Services: None (demolished)
- Structure: Elevated
- Platforms: 2 side platforms
- Tracks: 2

Other information
- Opened: July 3, 1918; 108 years ago
- Closed: April 15, 1985; 41 years ago

Station succession
- Next north: Queens Boulevard (demolished)
- Next south: 121st Street
Location
Location within New York City Subway
Location within New York City
Location within New York
Street map
Station service legend
Symbol	Description
Stops all times	Stops in station at all times
Stops all times except late nights	Stops all times except late nights
Stops late nights only	Stops late nights only
Stops late nights and weekends	Stops late nights and weekends only
Stops weekdays during the day	Stops weekdays during the day
Stops weekends during the day	Stops weekends during the day
Stops all times except rush hours in the peak direction	Stops all times except rush hours in the peak direction
Stops all times except weekdays in the peak direction	Stops all times except weekdays in the peak direction
Stops daily except rush hours in the peak direction	Stops all times except nights and rush hours in the peak direction
Stops rush hours only	Stops rush hours only
Stops rush hours in the peak direction only	Stops rush hours in the peak direction only
Station closed	Station is closed
(Details about time periods)

The Metropolitan Avenue station was a station on the demolished section of the BMT Jamaica Line in Queens, New York City. It opened in 1918 and closed in 1985 in anticipation of the opening of the Archer Avenue lines. The next stop to the north was Queens Boulevard, until it was closed in 1985. The next stop to the south was 121st Street.

== History ==
This station was built as part of the Dual Contracts. It opened on July 3, 1918 by the Brooklyn Union Elevated Railroad, an affiliate of the Brooklyn Rapid Transit Company, after the removal of Atlantic Avenue Rapid Transit service from Dunton LIRR station, and closed on April 15, 1985, with the Q49 bus replacing it until December 11, 1988. The Q49 bus was discontinued when the rest of the Jamaica Line was connected to the Archer Avenue Subway.

Both the Metropolitan Avenue and Queens Boulevard stations were demolished in late 1990. The Jamaica–Van Wyck station, opened on December 11, 1988, has an entrance directly across the street from Metropolitan Avenue's former northeastern stair.

== Station layout ==
This elevated station had two tracks and two side platforms, with space for a third track in the center. The station had two entrances, one at 132nd Street, and another just west of Metropolitan Avenue.

A short stretch of third track was added for use as a lay-up or storage track, along with a scissor crossover near the temporary Queens Boulevard terminal in 1976, in anticipation of the line being cut back from 168th Street.
