= Queens Boulevard station =

New York City Subway station in Queens (closed 1985)

Queens Boulevard
- Former New York City Subway station
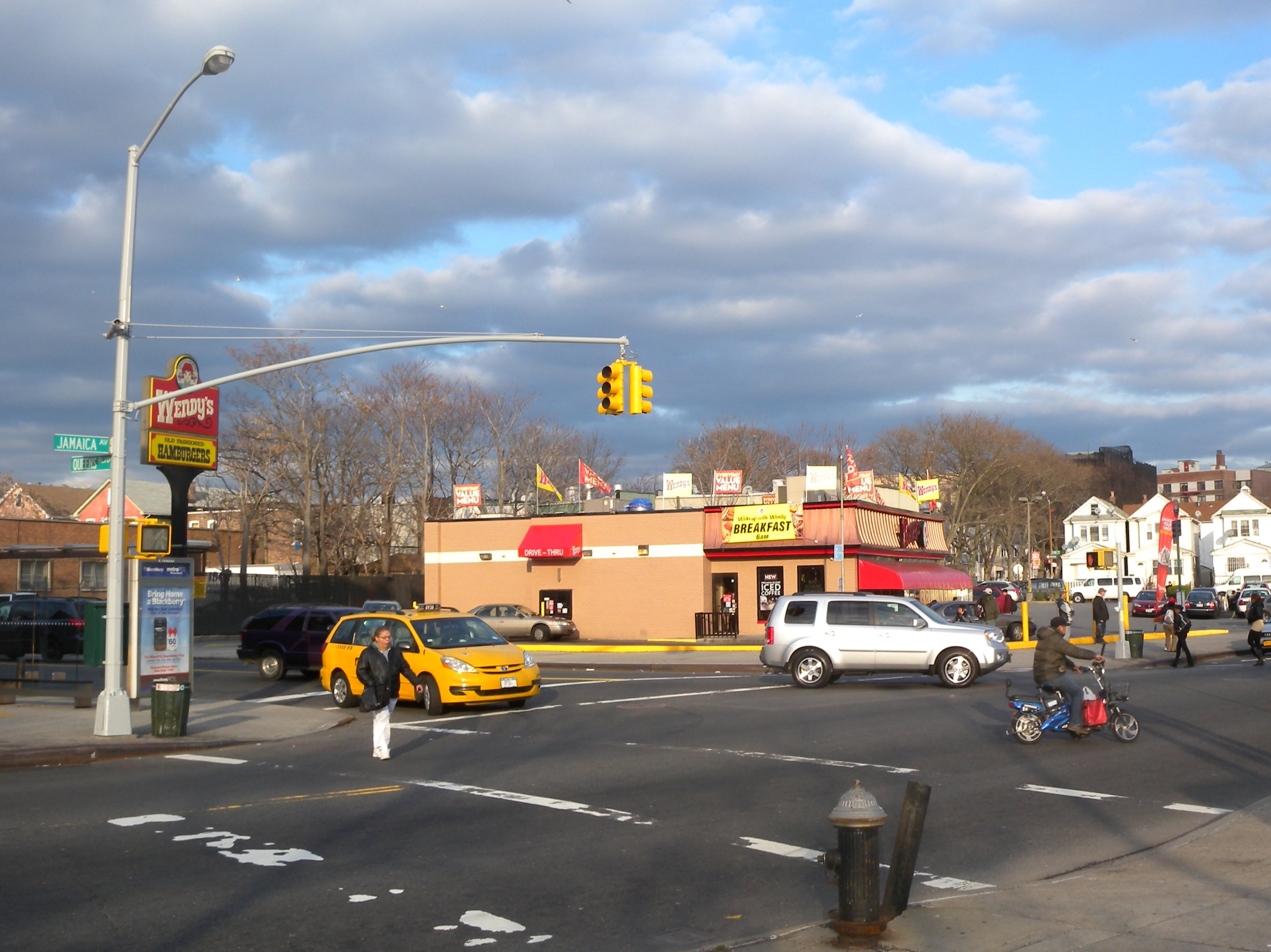
- Site, 20 years after demolition

Station statistics
- Address: Jamaica Avenue and Queens Boulevard; Queens, New York 11435
- Borough: Queens
- Locale: Jamaica
- Coordinates: 40°42′9″N 73°48′52.1″W
- Division: B (BMT)
- Line: BMT Jamaica Line
- Services: None (demolished)
- Structure: Elevated
- Platforms: 2 side platforms
- Tracks: 2

Other information
- Opened: July 3, 1918; 108 years ago
- Closed: April 15, 1985; 41 years ago

Station succession
- Next north: Sutphin Boulevard (demolished)
- Next south: Metropolitan Avenue (demolished)
Location
Location within New York City Subway
Location within New York City
Location within New York
Street map
Station service legend
Symbol	Description
Stops all times	Stops in station at all times
Stops all times except late nights	Stops all times except late nights
Stops late nights only	Stops late nights only
Stops late nights and weekends	Stops late nights and weekends only
Stops weekdays during the day	Stops weekdays during the day
Stops weekends during the day	Stops weekends during the day
Stops all times except rush hours in the peak direction	Stops all times except rush hours in the peak direction
Stops all times except weekdays in the peak direction	Stops all times except weekdays in the peak direction
Stops daily except rush hours in the peak direction	Stops all times except nights and rush hours in the peak direction
Stops rush hours only	Stops rush hours only
Stops rush hours in the peak direction only	Stops rush hours in the peak direction only
Station closed	Station is closed
(Details about time periods)

The Queens Boulevard station was a local station on the demolished section of the BMT Jamaica Line in Queens, New York City. It had two tracks and two side platforms, with space for a third track in the center. This station was built as part of the Dual Contracts. It opened on July 3, 1918, and was closed in 1985 in anticipation of the Archer Avenue Subway, and due to political pressure in the area. The next stop to the north was Sutphin Boulevard, until it was closed in 1977 and Queens Boulevard became a terminal station. The next stop to the south was Metropolitan Avenue.

== History ==
Queens Boulevard was built under the Dual Contracts as part of an extension of the Jamaica elevated past 111th Street to 168th Street, the second half of the line's extension along Jamaica Avenue east of Cypress Hills. It opened on July 3, 1918, The station served as a replacement for the Long Island Rail Road's Atlantic Avenue Rapid Transit line which ran along the LIRR Main Line.

By the 1960s, the city planned to close significant portions of the line in Jamaica. This was part of Mayor John Lindsay's effort to demolish "obsolete elevated railway structures" in the city, and in preparation for the Archer Avenue Subway which would replace the eliminated portions of the line. In 1977, the three stops east of Queens Boulevard station were closed, and it became temporary terminal for the Jamaica Avenue Line. This was opposed by local residents due to the increased traffic it would bring. While Queens Boulevard was the line's temporary terminal, a crossover switch was added west of the station, and the tracks continued east of the station to Sutphin Boulevard as lay-up tracks. Queens Boulevard was closed on April 15, 1985, when the line was cut back to 121st Street, with the Q49 bus (created to replace the eastern section of the line) replacing it. The Q49 bus was discontinued when the rest of the Jamaica Line was connected to the Archer Avenue Subway.

== Current status ==
Both the Metropolitan Avenue and Queens Boulevard stations were demolished in late 1990. The Jamaica–Van Wyck station, opened on December 11, 1988, is two blocks west of Queens Boulevard and replaces the two former Jamaica Line stations. The Sutphin Boulevard subway station has an entrance at 144th Street and Hillside Avenue, four blocks north of the former eastern exit of Queens Boulevard station, at 143rd Street. Both Jamaica–Van Wyck and Sutphin Boulevard only serve trains from the IND Queens Boulevard Line; the closest stations for Jamaica Line service are 121st Street to the west and Sutphin Boulevard–Archer Avenue–JFK Airport to the east.
