= Archer Avenue lines =

New York City Subway lines

BMT/IND Archer Avenue lines
- The B1 (BMT) Archer Avenue Line is typically served by the J and Z trains, while the B2 (IND) Archer Avenue Line is typically served by the E train.

Overview
- Owner: City of New York
- Locale: Queens
- Termini: Jamaica Center–York College (north); west of Jamaica–Van Wyck (south, upper level) south of Sutphin Boulevard–Archer Avenue–JFK Airport (south, lower level)
- Stations: 3

Service
- Type: Rapid transit
- System: New York City Subway
- Operator: New York City Transit Authority
- Daily ridership: 35,891

History
- Opened: December 11, 1988; 37 years ago

Technical
- Num of tracks: 2-4
- Character: Underground
- Track gauge: 4 ft 8 1/2 in (1,435 mm)
- Electrification: 600V DC third rail

The IND and BMT Archer Avenue lines are two superposed rapid transit lines of the New York City Subway, mostly running under Archer Avenue in the Jamaica neighborhood of Queens. The two lines are built on separate levels: trains from the IND Queens Boulevard Line (E train) serve the upper level, and trains from the BMT Jamaica Line (J and Z trains) serve the lower.

Despite being built decades after the unification of the New York City Subway system, and despite the fact that the BMT and IND Trackage (and platforms) are directly subjacent/superjacent to the other, the two lines are entirely separate, and do not share track connections of any kind. They have different chainings and radio frequencies. The B2 (IND Division) Archer Avenue line uses the upper level, and the B1 (BMT Division) Archer Avenue line uses the lower level. Passengers must utilize the stairwells, escalators or elevators for transfer.

These lines were conceived as part of the Metropolitan Transportation Authority (MTA)'s 1968 expansion plans, and along with the 63rd Street lines and a small section of the Second Avenue Subway, they were the only portions of the plan to be completed before it was scaled back due to fiscal issues. These lines were originally planned to be extended further east into Queens. Construction on the line started in 1973, and the project was expected to be completed in 1980. However, due to financial issues and concern about the quality of the construction, the lines did not open until December 11, 1988. On that date, several bus routes serving the 169th Street station were diverted to the new bus terminal at Jamaica Center. This line is also used by passengers transferring to or from the Long Island Rail Road and the AirTrain JFK.

== Extent and service ==
The following services use the Archer Avenue lines:

Service information		Lines served	Section of line
	Former company	Lines served	Section of line
"E" train	IND	Eighth Avenue Local and Queens Boulevard Express	upper level, north of junction with the IND Queens Boulevard Line
"J" train "Z" train	BMT	Nassau Street and Jamaica Local/Express	lower level, north of 121st Street (at 129th Street) on the BMT Jamaica Line

The two Archer Avenue lines begin at a northern (geographic eastern) terminal, Jamaica Center–York College (E, J, and Z trains), as a bi-level subway, each level having two tracks. The upper level is used by the B2 (IND Division) Archer Avenue line, and uses IND radio frequencies, while the lower level is used by the B1 (BMT Division) Archer Avenue line, and uses BMT radio frequencies. The two lines run compass west along Archer Avenue to another station at Sutphin Boulevard–Archer Avenue–JFK Airport, where connections can be made to the Long Island Rail Road and AirTrain JFK. West of this station, the two levels diverge. The lower level tracks (J and Z trains) continue roughly compass northwest, emerging from a portal near 89th Road and 130th Street and paralleling the Main Line of the LIRR before turning west onto the elevated structure of the BMT Jamaica Line at about 127th Street. The upper level tracks (E train) turn compass north under the Van Wyck Expressway, with another station at Jamaica Avenue. Just north of Hillside Avenue, they meet the four tracks of the IND Queens Boulevard Line at a flying junction, with connections to both the local and express tracks.

Jamaica Center was not intended to be the lines' northern terminal, as there are spurs on both levels for possible future extensions. On the lower level, they continue one train length and end at bumper blocks. This was a planned extension toward Hollis. Where the lower level tracks end, there is a provision for a diamond crossover switch at the end of the tunnel (under 160th Street). On the upper level, the tracks curve south to run under 160th Street and stop at about Tuskegee Airmen Way (formerly South Road), also ending at bumper blocks. The plan was for this line to use the LIRR Atlantic Branch right-of-way and run to Springfield Boulevard or Rosedale. Where the upper level tracks stub end, there is a provision for a portal to go outside if the line going to Southeastern Queens is ever built. The tail tracks on both levels are currently used for storage.

== History ==
=== Planning ===
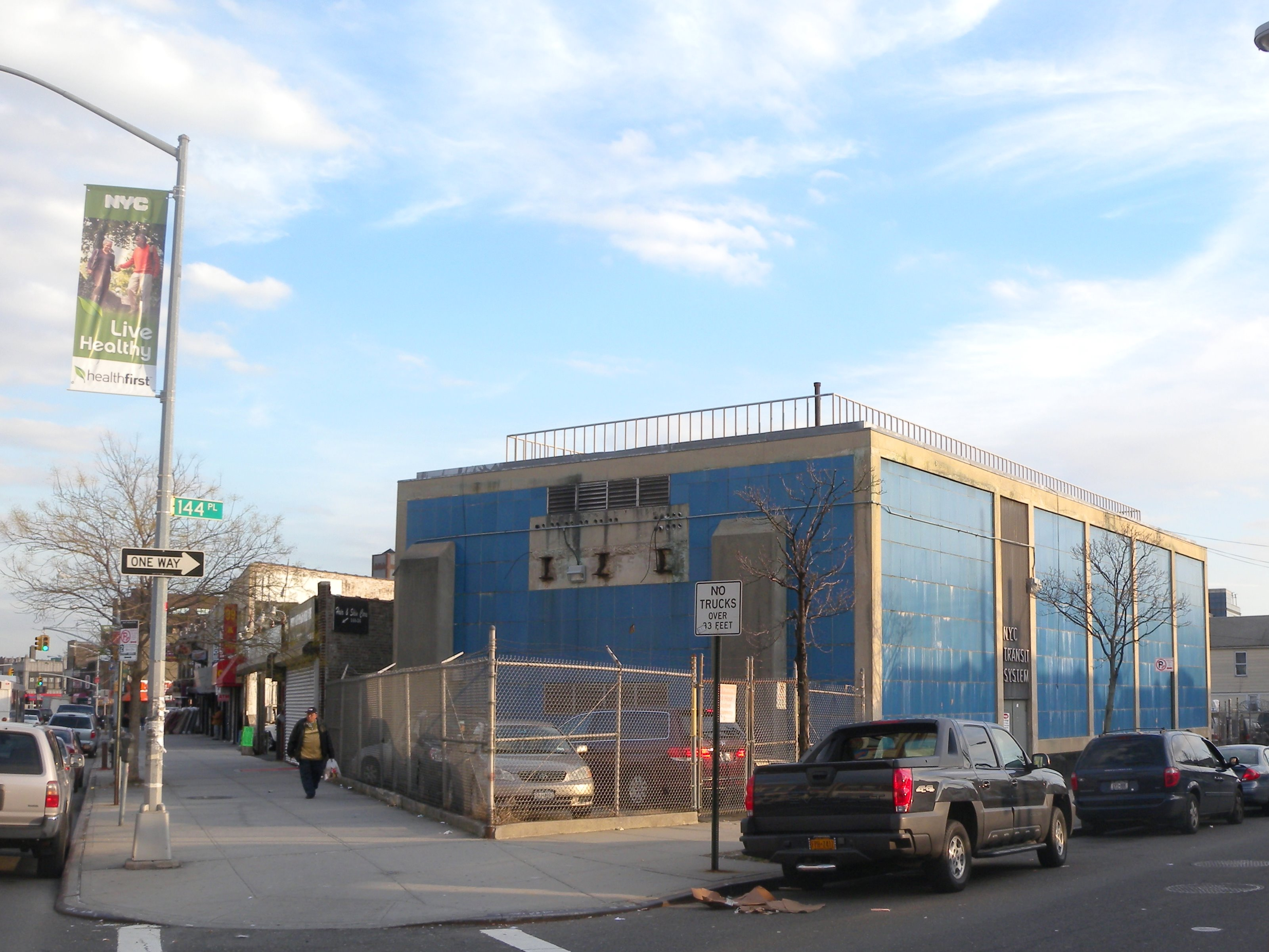
BMT powerhouse, 144th Place and Jamaica Avenue

What is now the Archer Avenue subway was originally conceived as an extension of the IND Queens Boulevard Line under the IND Second System in the 1920s and 1930s. The original plans had a line diverging south of Van Wyck Boulevard station (now called Briarwood), running down what is now the Van Wyck Expressway to Rockaway Boulevard near modern John F. Kennedy International Airport. A bellmouth with two additional trackways was built to the east of the station to facilitate this extension, which was never constructed due to lack of funding.

The current Archer Avenue plans emerged in the 1960s under the city and Metropolitan Transportation Authority (MTA)'s Program for Action. It was conceived as an expansion of Queens Boulevard service to a Southeast Queens Line along the right-of-way of the Long Island Rail Road (LIRR) Atlantic Branch towards Locust Manor, and as a replacement for the dilapidated eastern portions of the Jamaica Avenue elevated within the Jamaica business district which business owners and residents sought removal of; both would meet at the double-decked line under Archer Avenue. The two-track spur from the Queens Boulevard Line would use the original Van Wyck Boulevard bellmouths. Design work on the line began in 1969. The lines and the Jamaica El removal were part of urban renewal efforts in the Downtown Jamaica area. This included the construction of the York College campus, which was planned to be built in conjunction with the LIRR Atlantic Branch connection. The connection to the Jamaica Line, Route 133, was to begin at Jamaica Avenue and 127th Street and continue as an elevated to the LIRR embankment and then go underground at 91st Avenue before connecting with the Archer Avenue line at 132nd Street. Route 133 was to be over 4,000 feet (1,200 m) long.

The original plan for the upper level (now the E train) was for it to continue as a two-track line along the LIRR Atlantic Branch. It would have run through Locust Manor and Laurelton stations, with stops at Sutphin Boulevard, Parsons Boulevard (which was called Standard Place in planning documents), Linden Boulevard, Baisley Boulevard, and Springfield Boulevard. The line would have served a large-scale housing development at Rochdale Village; such a line would have required conversion involving modifying existing platforms at Locust Manor and Laurelton to accommodate the IND loading gauge, as well as constructing new stations to serve Southeast Queens. It would have also run parallel to the eastern Montauk Branch, which already provided parallel service through St. Albans to Jamaica. The lower level (now the J and Z trains) would have been extended eastward toward Hollis (near the Hollis LIRR station). Due to a lack of funding as well as some political opposition, these plans were never implemented.

The line's opening was intended to end the need for residents of Southeast Queens to pay a double fare to get to Manhattan.

As part of the project, several new engineering designs were employed, such as the use of graffiti resistant tiles, the use of welded steel rails on rubber pads to cut down on noise, and the use of blowers within the trackbed to disperse the heat generated by the trains' air conditioning systems. In addition, noise-dampening acoustical tiles were installed on station walls and ceilings to reduce noise levels. In the three stations, 21 escalators were installed in addition to electronic train arrival signs, backlighted station signage, and platform-edge strips. The stations were built to be nearly free of columns and have 213,000 square feet of high suspended ceiling. The mezzanine area of the Jamaica-Van Wyck station was designed to allow natural light to enter the station to the platform area, and has 5,000 square feet of windows.

=== Construction ===
==== 1970s ====
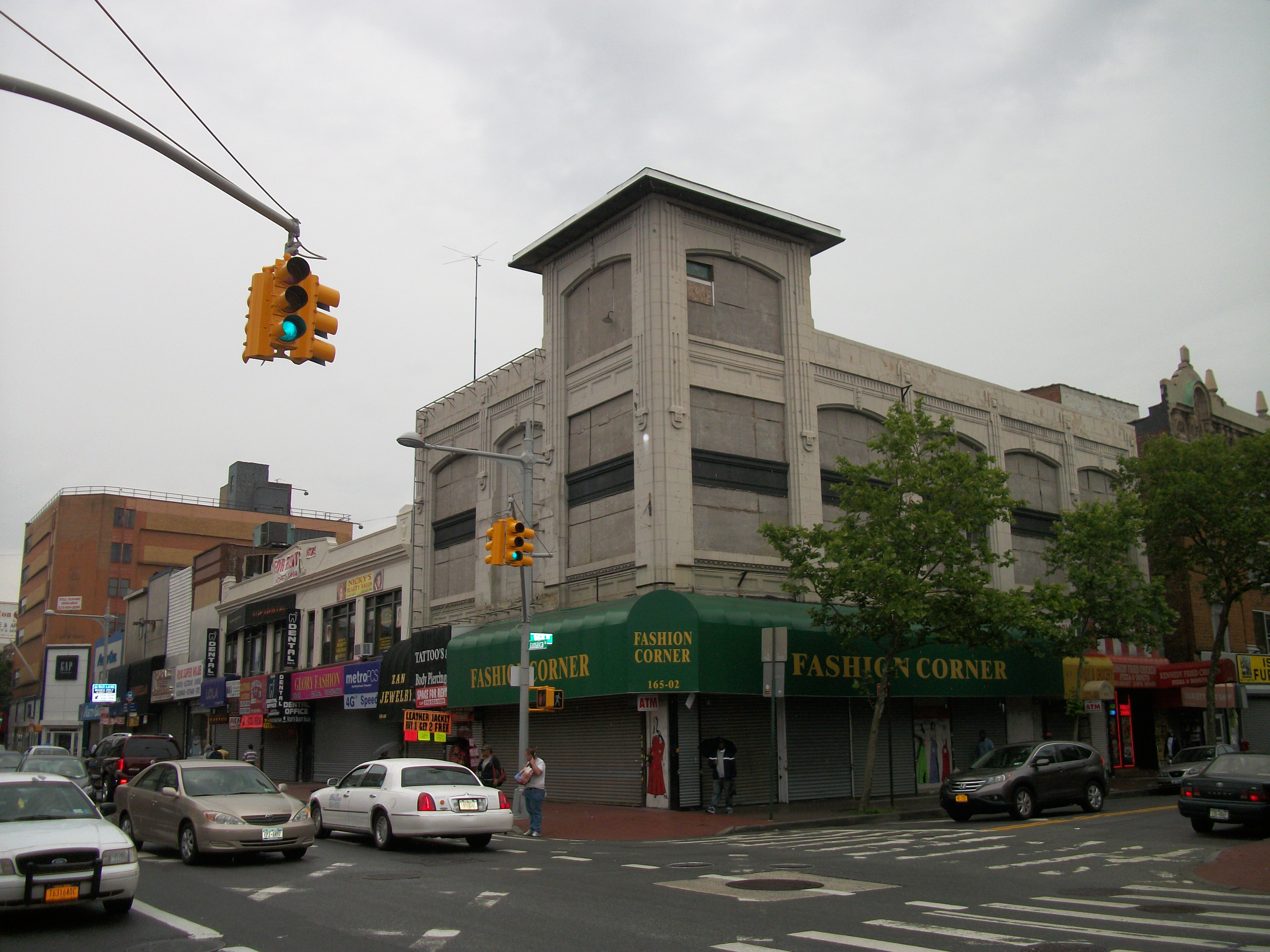
The former station house of 168th Street station, the former terminal of the BMT Jamaica Line.

The Archer Avenue subway's groundbreaking took place on August 15, 1972, at Archer Avenue and 151st Street. The first section of the line to be built was between 147th Place and 151st Street under Archer Avenue. $162 million of the $242 million project was paid for by the city, with the state footing the remainder of the bill. Construction on the Archer Avenue subway began on October 23, 1973, at 159th Street and Beaver Road, just south of Archer Avenue. It was then expected that the subway would be complete by 1980 or 1981.

On March 27, 1974, a fire broke out in the tunnel under 150th Street, temporarily severing telephone service in the area. The fire started when waterproofing tar being sprayed on the tunnel walls was ignited.

In July 1974, the federal government announced its approval of a $51.1 million grant for the project. The Jamaica–Van Wyck station was estimated to have 1,200 passengers during rush hours, while the Sutphin Boulevard and Parsons Boulevard stations were expected to be used by 5,300 and 8,700 passengers during that period, respectively. Mayor Abraham Beame, on December 13 of that year, announced that he had decided to prioritize the construction of the Southeast Queens Line while postponing construction of the Second Avenue Subway for six years, and as a result, he faced opposition among some members of the New York City Board of Estimate. Prior to making this decision, in October, Beame had considered deferring the construction of all new lines, including this line, due to the lack of federal aid. On October 31, the MTA Chairman David Yunich had announced this decision. On January 16, 1975, a spokesman for the Mayor said that work on the line would proceed even though a report found that the Mayor's plan to save the existing fare and construct new lines was off by as much $1 billion. On June 3, 1975, Queens Borough President Donald Manes and other Jamaica leaders pressed for the formal transfer of half of the $74 million in federal funds approved for the Second Avenue Subway to the Archer Avenue project. On March 5, 1975, the MTA announced that the line should open by 1981. An August MTA letter stated that the line would not open until 1984.

Construction of two 200-foot (61 m) tunnels under the nine tracks of the LIRR Main Line in Jamaica began in January 1976, and were part of a line sections starting at Archer Avenue near 159th Street and ending about 150 feet (46 m) south of South Road near the Atlantic Branch, passing underneath the center of the York College campus. The two tunnels were built by MacLean, Grove and Company for $4.35 million, while the entire segment, Section 5, cost $24,810,955. This section was constructed using the tunneling shield method. The LIRR Main Line structure was heavily reinforced with metal beams and cables to prevent movement, which could have forced a temporary shutdown of the busy line. A continuous monitoring system was put into place and direct communication was maintained with LIRR personnel at track level. This section is 45 feet (14 m) below street level and 60 feet (18 m) below the LIRR tracks, and was deemed by the MTA's chief engineer to be the most costly and difficult portion of this section of the line. The average width of the two tunnels was 35 feet (11 m). The driving of the two tunnels was expected to begin in September 1975. The first tunnel, the eastern one, was expected to be completed by late February early March 1976. On May 23, 1976, MTA Chairman David Yunich announced that the construction of the two tunnels under the Long Island Rail Road in Jamaica were completed. Work on the entire section was expected to be completed by September 1976. South of these tunnel segments, the line would have been extended south several hundred yards, going up a ramp, and onto the Atlantic Branch's right-of-way at an embankment at Liberty Avenue. Work on this section was expected to begin in the late 1980s, and would have used the Atlantic Branch to Springfield Boulevard, diverting trains to the Montauk Branch. In the interim, the agency planned to use the tracks for train storage.

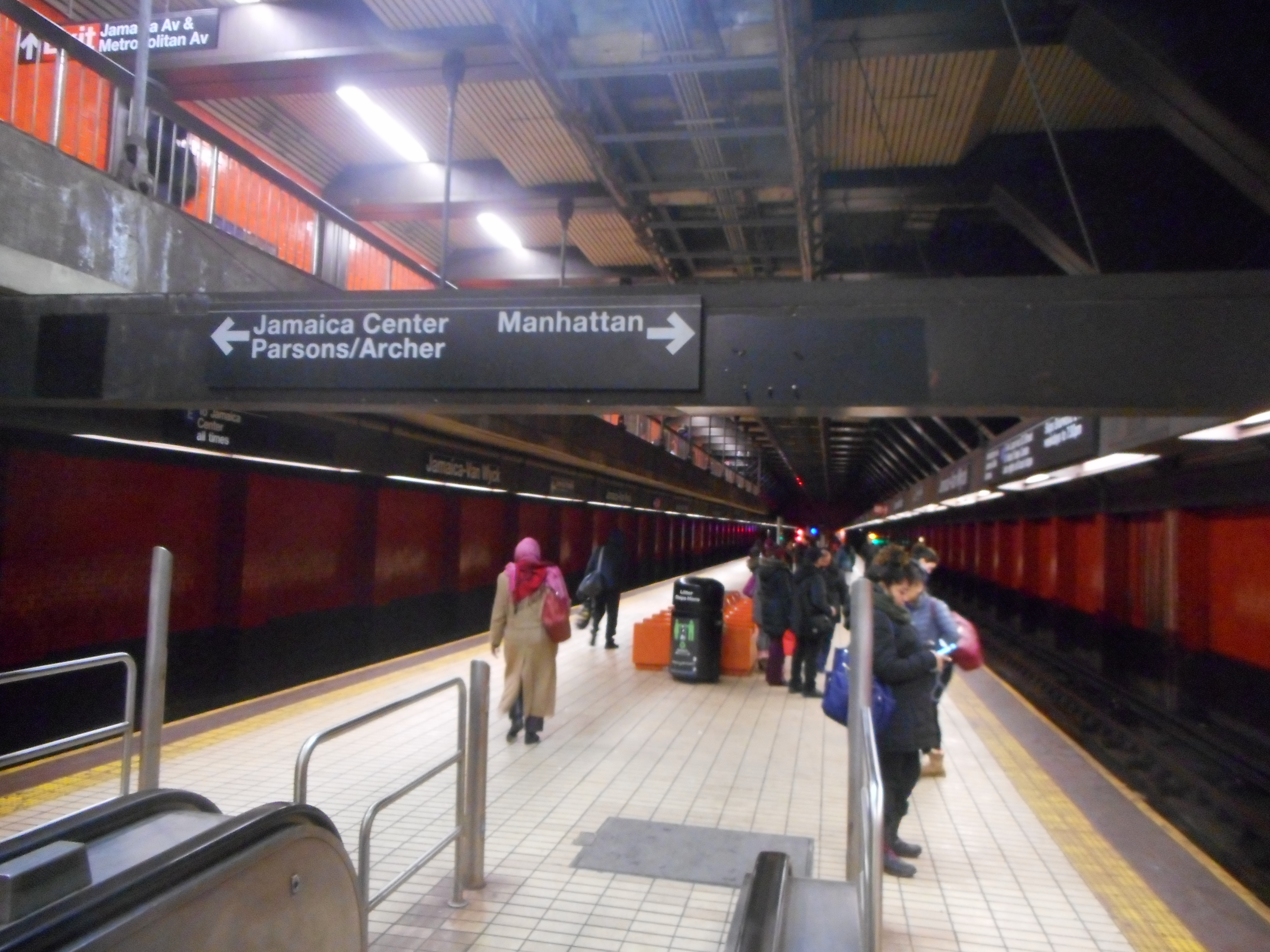
View of the Jamaica-Van Wyck station.

On March 17, 1976, construction began on a 1,145 feet (349 m)-long section of Route 133 underneath the LIRR tracks and the Van Wyck Expressway. The first tunnel between the Jamaica Avenue Elevated and the Archer Avenue subway was holed through in October 1977. The second tunnel connection holing through of the Archer Avenue subway tunnels occurred on December 14, 1977. On October 26, 1979, the groundbreaking for Section 2, which stretched from 144th Street to 147th Place, took place. This section was awarded to Slattery Associate Incorporated and Agrett Enterprise Corporation for $45,251,350, and was constructed using cut-and-cover. This section was expected to be completed in four years, and included the Sutphin Boulevard station. Work on the station was planned to begin in spring 1980.

On September 10, 1977, the Jamaica elevated was cut back from 168th Street to Queens Boulevard, closing the stations at 168th Street, 160th Street, and Sutphin Boulevard. The demolition of the elevated line was originally planned to be done upon the completion of the Archer Avenue line, but was pushed up at the request of Mayor Abe Beame, who wanted to accelerate the redevelopment plan for Downtown Jamaica. The reconstruction of the Queens Boulevard station to become the line's terminal and the transferring of equipment took 12 to 15 months and cost $2.2 million. One of the modifications made was the installation of a 350 feet (110 m)-long double crossover to the west of the station. Work on the double crossover was completed at the NYCTA's new track plant at Linden Shops, saving four months. It was installed over the course of two weekends. Q49 buses (distinct from the modern Q49 route) replaced Jamaica elevated service, and free transfers were provided to subway service at Queens Boulevard. Bus service ran every two to three minutes during rush hours, and met every train during late nights.

The removal of the elevated's frame was expected to take six to eight months. Demolition on this section was expected to begin early in 1978. In April 1978, work was scheduled to begin on May 1 and be completed in mid-July. However, the work started on June 28, 1978, and was scheduled to be completed by early fall 1978—six to ten weeks later. The $927,000 contract to demolish the structure was awarded to the Wrecking Corp. of America. The demolition of the structure, with the exception of the station platforms, was completed overnight to minimize potential impacts to businesses and traffic. Work to reconstruct the street, install new traffic lights and overhead utility lines was expected to take an additional year. Work tearing down the structure began at 168th Street and proceeded to just west of the Queens Boulevard station. In November 1978, the only sections of the structure left were at 155th Street and 160th Street.

In April 1979, the Jamaica Water Supply Company, which supplied water to 118,000 residents of western Nassau County and southeastern Queens, sent a report to the New York State Department of Environmental Conservation. The report stated that the NYCTA would excessively pump too much water out of the ground during the station's construction, which could lower the water table to the level at which salt water would infiltrate and destroy its shallowest aquifer, which produced a quarter of its water supply. These charges were denied by the NYCTA, which said that it would recharge water it pumped from the ground, like in past projects, and that it would replace water flushed into the city sewer system. 2 billion gallons of water worth $1.4 million had been given to the company since 1976. The company had agreed to reduce its pumping at wells near the subway by the amount received by the NYCTA under previous agreement, but did not do so due to an increase in consumer demand. Subsequently, a new agreement was negotiated for work at the Sutphin Boulevard stop, which required more water pumping because more time was needed for the project–a sewer underneath Sutphin Boulevard had to be reinstalled.

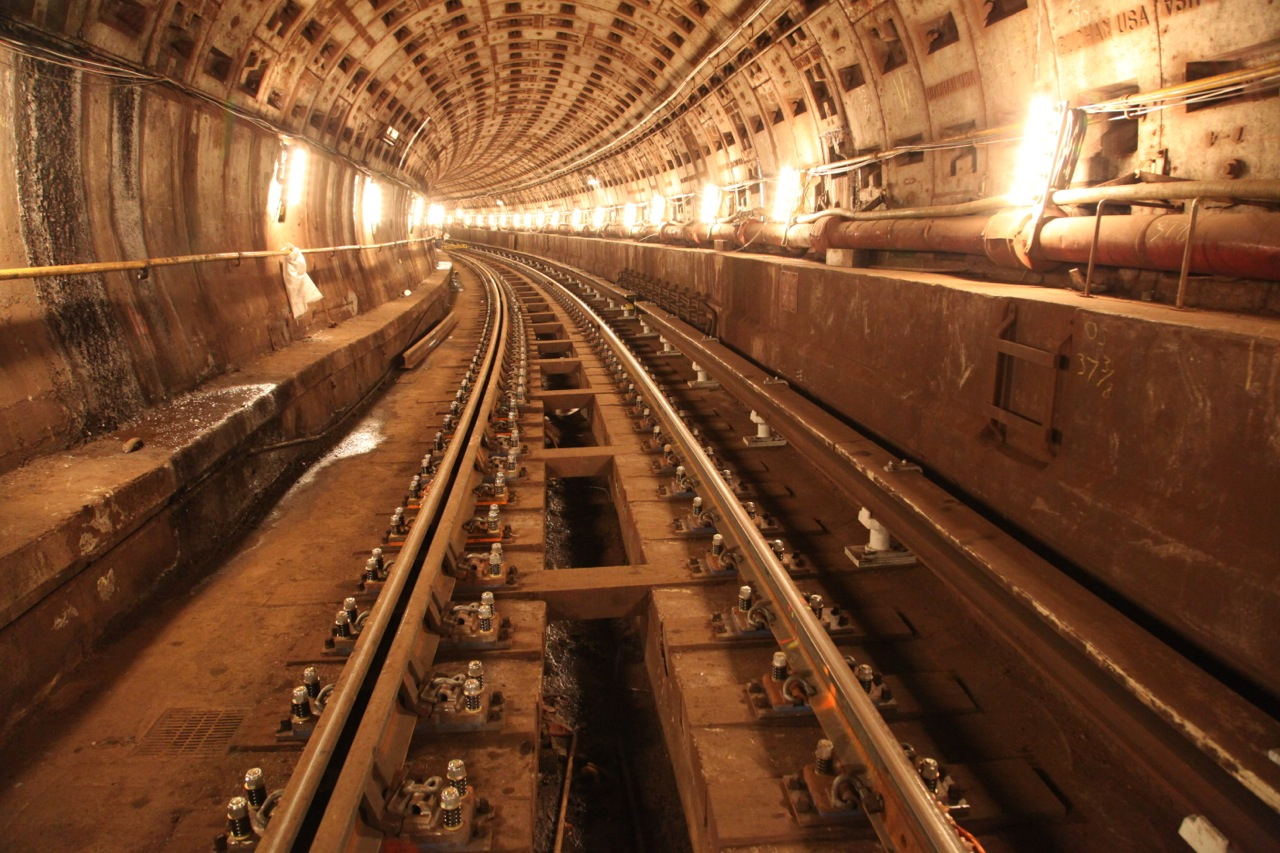
A portion of the line constructed using the tunneling shield method near Jamaica–Van Wyck station.

On October 17, 1979, the groundbreaking for Section 7, a 1,300 feet (396 m) cut-and-cover section of the Archer Avenue line, took place. This section included the Hillside Avenue Connector, which connected the line with the IND Queens Boulevard Line, and included the Jamaica–Van Wyck station. This section extended north from 89th Avenue to a point 250 feet (76 m) past Hillside Avenue, and was expected to be completed in 43 months. This section was constructed by Schiavone Construction Company for $37,728,140. Most of the project was constructed via cut-and-cover methods, with portions of the lines excavated with tunneling shield methods. The line was constructed through the sandy soil of south Jamaica, and therefore, slurry walls were used to construct the line, a relatively new construction method in New York City. This method replaced blasting and shorting. Pumps and waterproofing were used to keep ground water from getting into the tunnel. According to the engineer in charge of the project, the water could reach a depth of 40 feet (12 m) in a heavy rain without them.

On December 20, 1979, the New York City Board of Estimate passed a measure approving the selection and acquisition of easements in private property at the Van Wyck Expressway and 89th Avenue for an entrance to the Jamaica–Van Wyck station.

==== 1980s ====
On September 26, 1980, $40 million of federal funding was transferred to the MTA to build the connection to the Jamaica Line, to complete the Parsons Boulevard station, and the installation of track along the line, including the section south of that station to South Road and 158th Street. Work continued on the connection to the Queens Boulevard Line. In October, the contract for the section between 89th Avenue and Archer Avenue was supposed to be let. This grant raised the share of the project funded by UMTA to $210 million. An additional $120 million in funding was required to complete the project. The project's opening date at this juncture was October 1984.

In October 1980, the MTA considered stopping work on the line and on the 63rd Street Line, due to its budget crisis and the bad state of the existing subway system. This decision was supported by City Council President and MTA Board Member Carol Bellamy. It was unclear whether the federal government would allow the MTA to transfer the funds to system maintenance. At the time, the line was scheduled to be opened in late 1984, with the project's cost ballooning to $455 million, of which contracts worth $268 million had been awarded. Originally set to be opened in 1980, the line kept getting delayed, and by the late 1970s, the opening was delayed to 1983, then to 1985 or 1986. In 1981, due to lack of money, all bidding on new subway and bus projects for the MTA was suspended, except for the already-built portions of the 63rd Street and Archer Avenue lines, which were allowed to continue. Progress of the Archer Avenue line temporarily stopped in March 1982, when on March 4, part of the tunnel caved in around the vicinity of Archer Avenue and 138th Street, where one construction worker was killed, and three others narrowly escaped injury. In September 1983, the project was 80% complete, and was expected to be in operation in fall 1985.

Shortly after midnight on April 15, 1985, the BMT Jamaica Line was cut back to 121st Street, closing the Metropolitan Avenue and Queens Boulevard stations. The Q49 bus was extended to 121st Street to replace service. Track and signal modifications needed to accommodate the temporary operation of 121st Street as a terminal station was done during the two prior days, with J trains cut back to Eastern Parkway, replaced by the Q49. Until the opening of the Archer Avenue line in 1988, J trains alternately terminated at 111th Street and 121st Street, with peak period headways to 121st Street being ten minutes. This temporary service pattern was estimated to be in effect for six or seven months. Queens Community Board 9 members and businessmen complained about the removal of ten parking spots from the south side of Jamaica Avenue and of three spaces on the north side, all between 121st Street and 120th Street for the bus shuttle. In October 1986, the elevated section from 127th Street to Sutphin Boulevard was turned over to New York City to be demolished. The demolition of the structure and the reconstruction of Jamaica Avenue was estimated to cost $1.6 million. The removal of the structure was slated to begin in mid-1990.

=== Opening delays ===
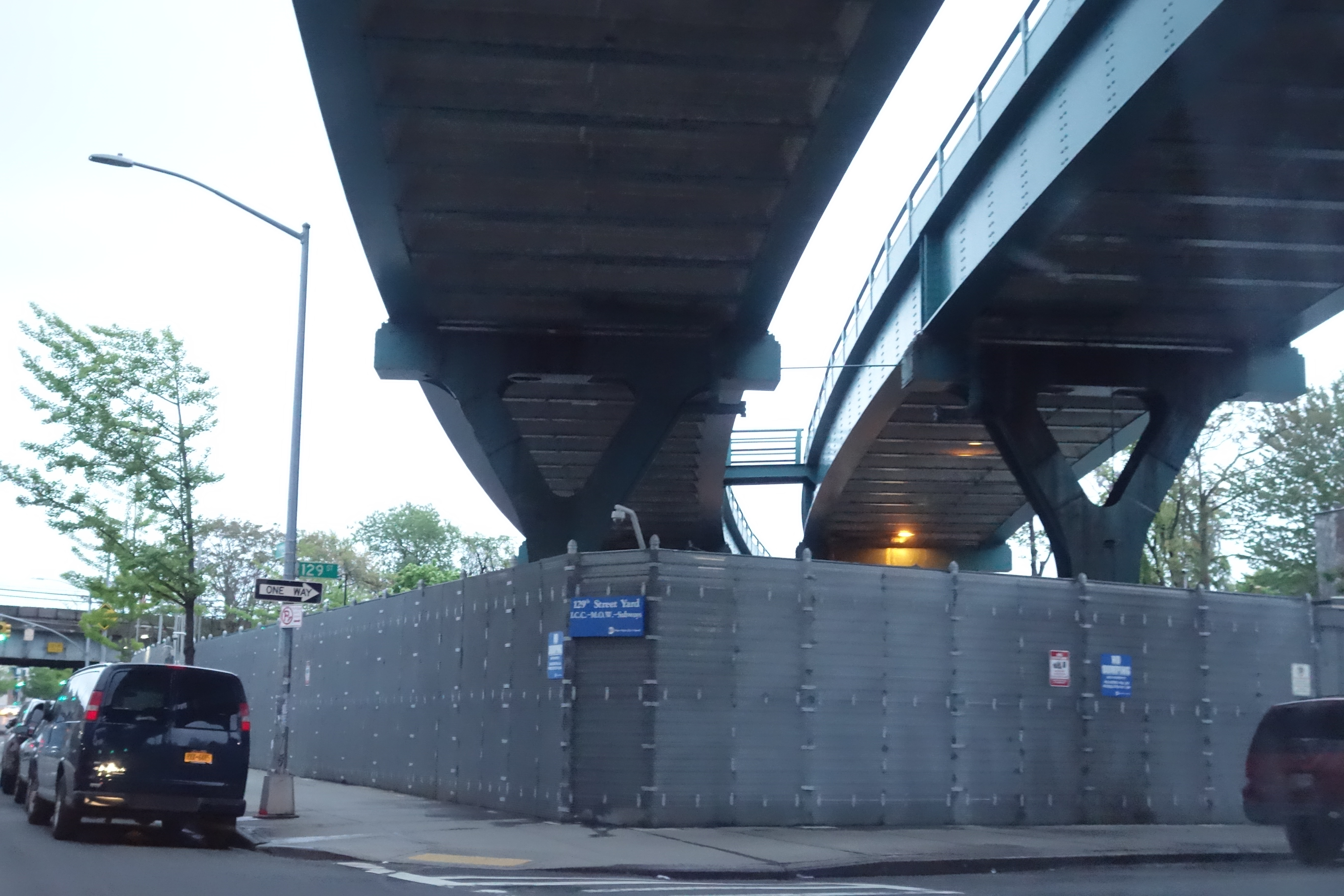
View of the elevated structure constructed to connect the BMT Jamaica Line and the BMT Archer Avenue Line.

Despite the delays, disagreements over the condition of the line and the speed of construction, and the federal Urban Mass Transportation Administration (UMTA)'s reluctance to provide funding to complete the line due to concerns over the quality of concrete and the leakage of water into the tunnels, construction was completed a year ahead of schedule, in 1983. Due to the New York City fiscal crisis in 1975, the subway line was truncated to Jamaica Center.

In May 1985, the line was slated to be opened by December 1986. Construction on the project was suspended indefinitely, the MTA announced on July 29, 1985, because of water leakage into the tunnel. The tunnel flooded in summer 1984 during a heavy rainstorm, and even though structural improvements were made to fix the issue, groundwater leaks continued, scattering puddles along 1.5 miles (2.4 km) of the line.

On August 3, 1985, Senator Al D'Amato of New York stated that the project was unsafe and called for the suspension of $44 million in federal aid for the project, citing a preliminary report by the United States Department of Transportation inspector general. The report claimed that the NYCTA failed to test the quality of 94% of the concrete poured in the project and that no follow-up work was done even though 23% of the concrete had failed tests after being reexamined. In addition, the report stated that 48,000 cubic yards of concrete had been paid for without evidence of its delivery. UMTA suspended the payments at his request on August 17. It stated that it would consider restoring the funds if the MTA hired an independent consultant completed studies on the tunnels' structural integrity. On August 26, 1985, the MTA hired an independent consultant, Construction Technology Laboratories (CTL), to inspect the tunnel. A preliminary visual inspection by CTL found corrosion on the steel beams and minor cracks in concrete walls. On August 23, the MTA agreed to commit $39 million of its own funds to fix the Archer Avenue and 63rd Street Lines, of which $14 million was given to the Archer Avenue project. Had the UMTA funds not been restored, the MTA would have absorbed the cost by cutting back other projects in its $8.5 billion capital program.

On April 9, 1986, the head of UMTA stated that if the 63rd Street and Archer Avenue lines were not completed, he would demand that the NYCTA refund more than $700 million in federal aid used on the projects. The federal government paid for two-thirds of the $1.23 billion spent on the two projects.

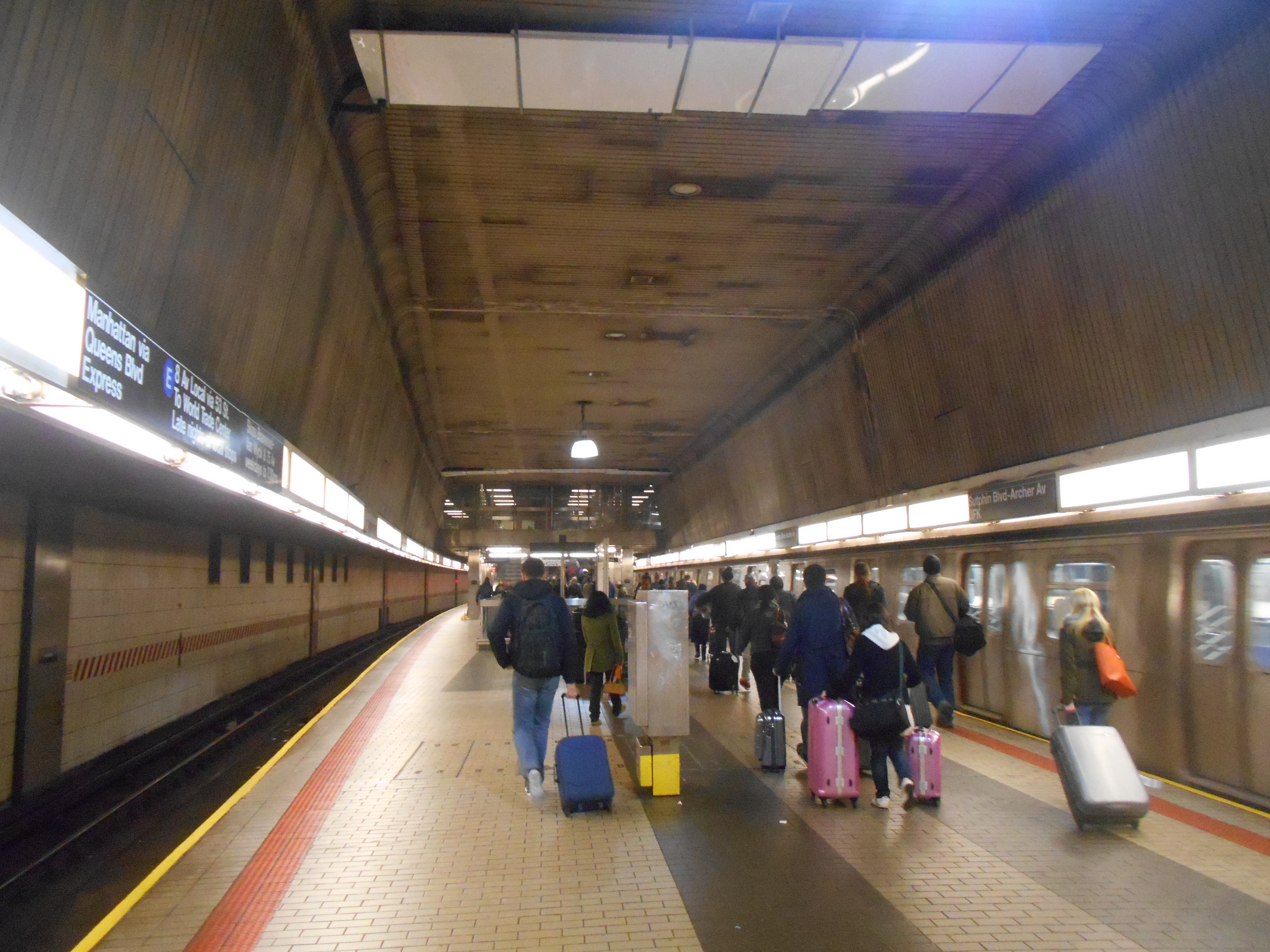
A view of the Sutphin Boulevard station. Passengers can be seen with luggage exiting the E train and heading for the AirTrain to JFK Airport.

In June 1986, CTL issued a final report that found that the tunnels of the Archer Avenue and 63rd Street Lines were structurally sound. The report had been ordered by the MTA after UMTA stopped payments on $75 million in grants for the projects, which were 90 percent complete. While the grants were frozen, for a year, the MTA spent $22 million of its own funds to complete existing contracts and to maintain them. The study was requested to show that it was possible to fix leaks and cracks in both projects and an improperly altered ceiling girder in the 63rd Street Tunnel. If the study was approved, work projected to resume in January. It found that there were minor flaws in the projects, such as flaking concrete on a portion of the Archer Avenue tunnel wall, and uneven welds in the altered girder in the 63rd Street Tunnel. The report recommended some rewelding, the removal of stalactites, filling air pockets in some sections of concrete, the removal of debris, waterproofing, and the use of weak electrical charges to prevent corrosion of steel beams.

In August 1986, a study by Knight Associates, which cost $300,000, was scheduled to be released. The study analyzed damage done to the switches, signals, lights, pumps, ventilation fans, substations, third rail and escalator and elevator equipment that resulted from years of moisture, vandalism and neglect. Damage was worse in the Archer Avenue line, where electrical equipment was damaged by a rainstorm in 1984.

On February 6, 1987, NYCTA President David Gunn announced a proposal to spend $41 million on the two projects, and request $29 million for design work on the 63rd Street Connector. UMTA released $60 million in funds to complete the Archer Avenue and 63rd Street Lines on July 1, 1987. The MTA announced that they would open in December 1988 and October 1989, respectively.

=== Opening and later use ===
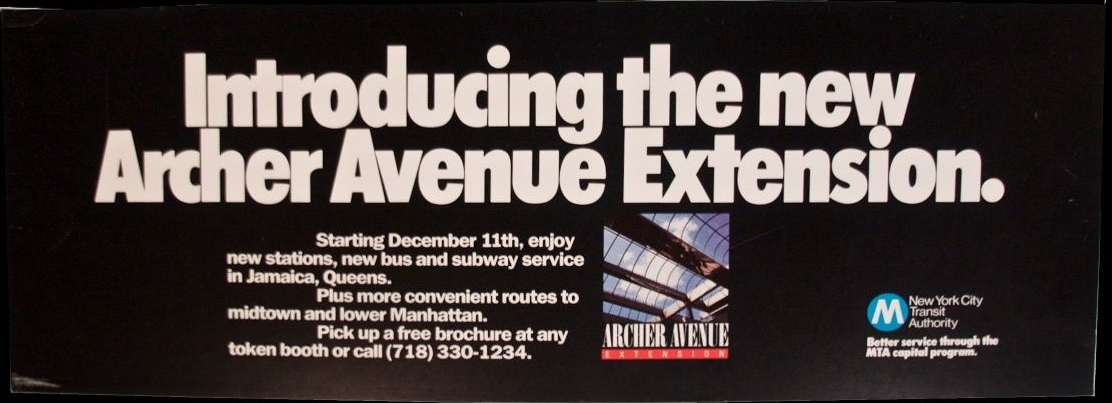
This poster from 1988 was posted on buses and in subway cars to announce the opening of the Archer Avenue Line.

The line opened on December 11, 1988, at a cost of nearly five times its original budgeted cost and cut back to a length of 2 miles (3 km). It consisted of the first stations added to the subway system since the 57th Street station opened in 1968, the first stations in the entire subway system designed to be fully accessible, and the first stations in Queens since the IND Rockaway Line opened in 1956. The project's final cost was $465 million. The line's opening was hailed as a catalyst in the redevelopment of Jamaica, ending the neighborhood's urban blight.

A study completed in December 1988, before the line's opening, found that many riders getting to the stations in Jamaica used unregulated dollar vans to get there. It found that 20,000 people rode these vans on an average weekday to get to Jamaica subway stations along Hillside Avenue.

In 2020, the MTA announced that it would reconstruct 5,500 feet (1,700 m) of track and 7,800 feet (2,400 m) of third rail on the IND Archer Avenue Line, which had become deteriorated. During the first phase of reconstruction, for six weeks between September 19 and November 2, E service was cut back to Jamaica–Van Wyck, with a shuttle bus connecting to Sutphin Boulevard and Jamaica Center. The second phase of the IND line's reconstruction was completed in December 2020. Two years later, the MTA announced it would reconstruct 12,500 feet (3,800 m) of track on the BMT Archer Avenue Line. Starting on July 1, 2022, J service was cut back to 121st Street, and Z service was temporarily discontinued. The work continued until September 2022. A shuttle bus, the J99, ran from 121st Street to Jamaica–Van Wyck for the duration of the work.

== Service plans ==
The lower level was always intended for use by J/Z skip-stop service; however, there have been varying proposals for the services that were to serve the upper level. In the original service plan, the G and N local trains were to serve the Archer Avenue upper level, while the E and F express trains would have remained on the Queens Boulevard mainline towards 179th Street. (The N ran on the IND Queens Boulevard Line until 1987, when the N and R swapped northern terminals in Queens.) The N train was to run between Jamaica Center and Coney Island during weekdays while G trains were to terminate at 71st Avenue. During weekends and evenings the G train was to run between Jamaica Center and Smith–Ninth Streets, while N trains would terminate at 57th Street–Seventh Avenue or 71st Avenue. To serve the Archer Avenue Line during late nights, a G train shuttle would have run between Jamaica Center and Van Wyck Boulevard.

=== Jamaica Line ===
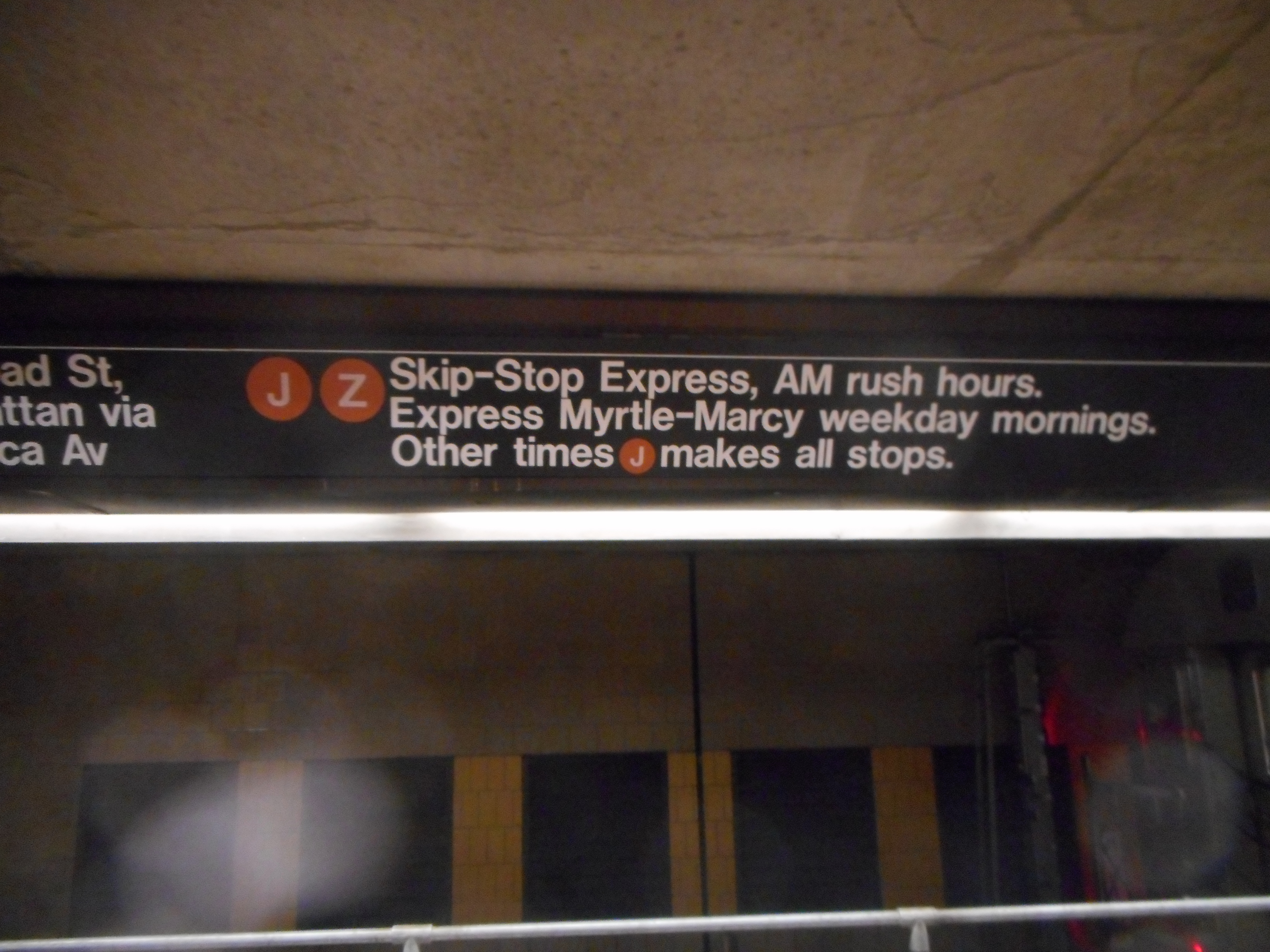
Sign at Jamaica Center explaining J/Z skip-stop service.

One of the goals of the project was to make Jamaica Avenue service as attractive as possible, and as a result, the NYCTA planned to provide a form of express service. The two options considered to speed up Jamaica Line service were skip-stop service, which would have split Jamaica services into two patterns that served alternate stops, and a zone-express service, which would have split Jamaica services into a short-turn local service and a full-length express services. The zone-express option was dismissed in favor of the skip-stop option because its operation has to be very precisely timed so as to not hinder reliability, because service in the outer zone past the boundary of zone express service at Crescent Street or 111th Street would be too infrequent, and because many stations would lose half their service. Outer-zone expresses after Crescent Street would skip stops on the local track until Eastern Parkway, from where it would run on the express track, stopping at Myrtle Avenue before going straight to Essex Street in Manhattan, skipping Marcy Avenue. Outer-zone expresses and inner-zone locals would have each been limited to frequencies of 10 minutes.

The TA decided to implement skip-stop service with two services labeled "J" and "Z", with lightly-used stops designated as "J" or "Z" stops, and those with higher ridership being all-stop stations. In addition, J and Z trains skipped Bowery in Manhattan at all times except evenings, nights and weekends. To further speed up service, J and Z trains would run express between Myrtle and Marcy. Trains on the J/Z ran every five minutes, an improvement over their previous headway of eight minutes. Skip-stop service ran to Manhattan in the morning between 7:15 and 8:15 a.m. and to Jamaica between 4:45 and 5:45 p.m.

Midday express service was added with J service continuing to run express in the peak direction between Marcy and Myrtle. Surveys of ridership at local stops found that service could be adequately provided by midday M service. The running time for skip-stop service from Parsons Boulevard to Broad Street was 48 minutes, compared to 54.5 minutes for all-local service and 52 for the E. It was expected that 2,250 Queens Boulevard riders would switch to the J and Z. To make J/Z service more attractive, all trains on those lines consisted of refurbished subway cars that were quieter, graffiti-free, and had improved lighting and new floors. All cars on the J/Z were expected to have air-conditioning by summer 1989, which was expected to make it a more attractive alternative to the E.

Queens Borough President Claire Shulman made multiple recommendations about revisions to the service plan for the extension at the MTA's February 1988 board meeting. She recommended that trains should use the express track between Myrtle Avenue and Eastern Parkway to reduce travel times, that the Chrystie Street Connection be reused for service to the Jamaica Line, that R service be extended to 179th Street, the restoration of 24-hour F service to 179th Street, and cutting back the G to 71st Avenue. Shulman also wanted consistency on the E and F routings, with all E service to Archer Avenue and all F service to 179th Street, and suggested the reopening of the Union Hall Street station on the LIRR.

=== Queens Boulevard Line ===
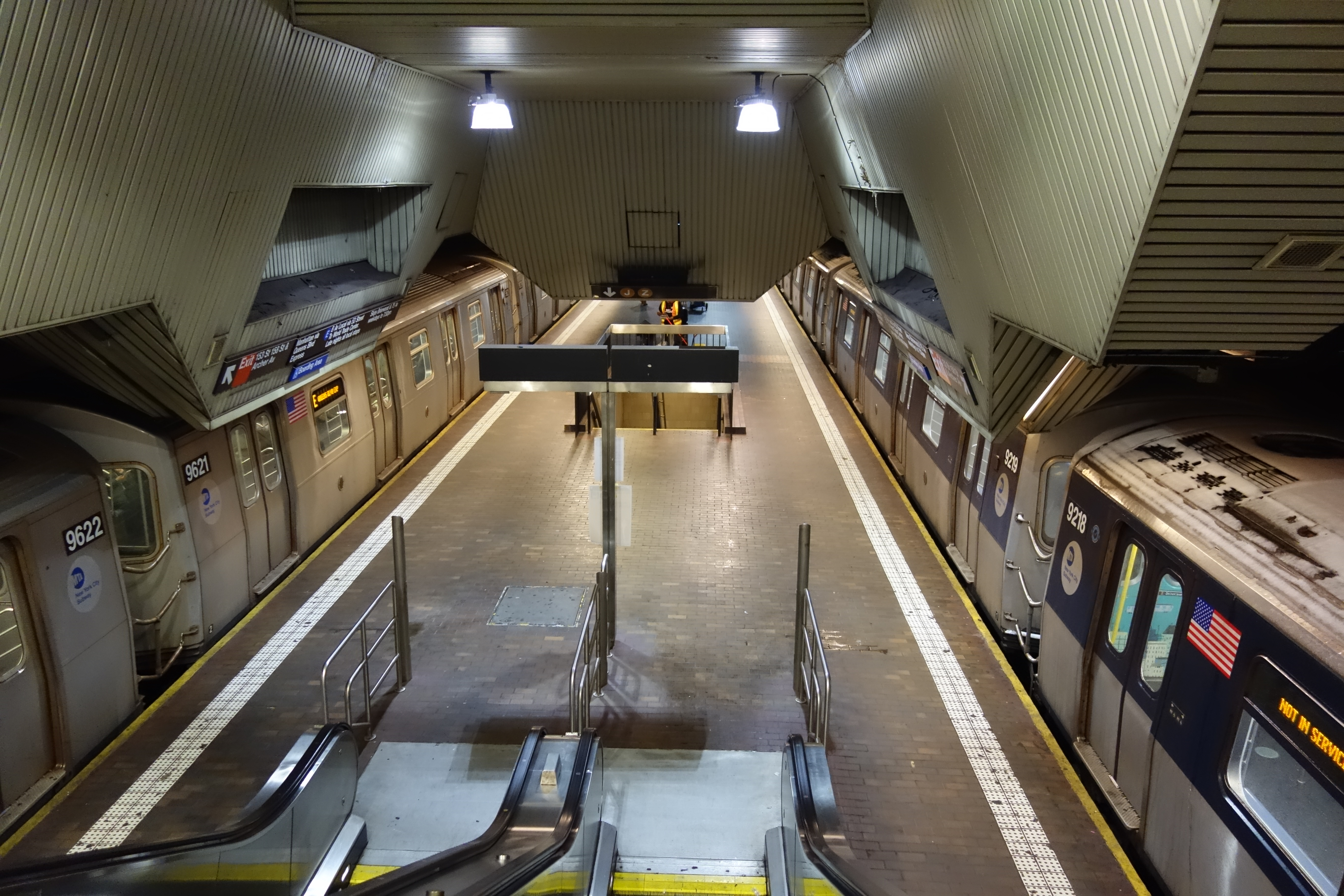
A pair of E trains at Jamaica Center

The opening of the Archer Avenue line was expected to reroute 17,500 riders from Hillside Avenue to Archer Avenue. Two service plans were identified prior to the February 25, 1988 public hearing. The first would have split rush-hour E service between the two branches, with late night service to 179th Street provided by the R, while the second would have had all E trains run via Archer Avenue and would have extended R locals to 179th Street. A modified version of the second plan was decided upon. When the Archer Avenue line opened in 1988, the E ran to Jamaica Center via the Queens Boulevard Line's express tracks. One E train began at 71st Avenue during the morning rush hour. The R was extended to 179th Street to serve local stations east of 71st Avenue and to allow F trains to continue running express to 179th Street. F trains no longer stopped at 169th Street between 10 a.m. and 3:30 p.m.

The change in the plan was the operation of some E trains from 179th Street as expresses during the morning rush hour to provide an appropriate level of E service to Archer Avenue during the morning rush, to maintain the same level of service to 179th Street while providing express service, and to provide greater choice for riders at the Parsons Boulevard and 179th Street stations on Hillside Avenue. It was decided not to divert some E trains to 179th Street during the afternoon rush hour so that Queens-bound riders would not be confused about where their E train was headed.

It was decided to serve Archer with the E as opposed to the F to minimize disruption to passengers who continued to use Hillside Avenue, to maximize Jamaica Avenue ridership and the length of the peak ridership period, which is longer on the F. The NYCTA had found that most riders using buses diverted to Archer used the E, while passengers on buses to 179th used the F. Having E trains run local between Continental Avenue and Van Wyck Boulevard was dismissed in order to provide 24 hour express service to the Archer Avenue line.

By 1992, R service was cut back to 71st–Continental Avenue at all times. In its place, the F ran local between 71st Avenue and 179th Street at all times.

=== Bus service ===
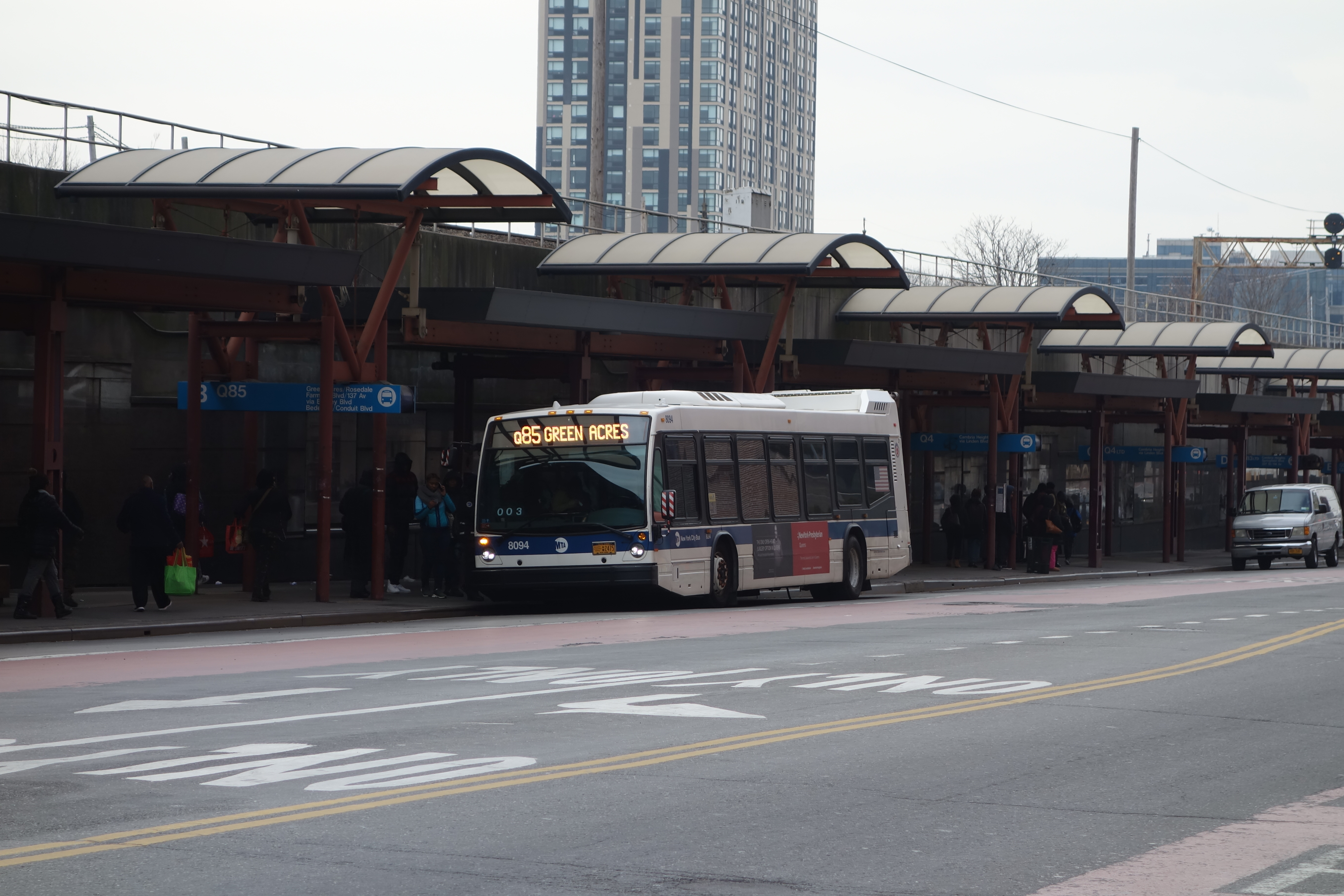
A view of a Q85 bus at the Jamaica Center Bus Terminal. This is one of the bus routes rerouted with the opening of the line.

In conjunction with the opening of the Archer Avenue line, major modifications were made to bus service. To reduce severe overcrowding at the 169th Street station, Merrick Boulevard bus routes were rerouted to the new Jamaica Center station, including the Q3A and Q4A, which were renumbered the Q83 and Q84, respectively, the Q5, Q42 and the Q85 (renamed/combined Q5A and Q5AB). A canopy was constructed soon after the opening to protect passengers from inclement weather. Limited-stop service was added to the Q4 in the evening rush-hour, supplementing that service in the morning, and was added to the Q5 and Q83 in both rush hours. The Q30, renumbered from the Q17A, and the Q31 were rerouted to serve the Jamaica Center and Sutphin Boulevard stations, having been extended from Jamaica Avenue and 169th Street. The Q17 bus was extended from the 165th Street Bus Terminal to Archer Avenue and Merrick Boulevard, and the Q75 was extended to the Jamaica Bus Terminal. The B22 bus, renamed the Q24, was extended to 171st Street and Jamaica Avenue. The B53 bus was renamed the Q54; the B56, the Q56; the B58, the Q58; the B59, the Q59; and the Q5S, the Q86. The Q49 shuttle bus was discontinued.

Initially three options were considered for modifications to bus service. Under all three options, the B22 was going to be extended to 171st Street and Jamaica Avenue and the Q49 shuttle was discontinued. Under Proposal 1 and 2, all Merrick Boulevard buses were to be rerouted to Archer Avenue. Proposal 1 would have also included the extension of Q17 to 168th Street and Archer Avenue, and the extension of the Q17A and Q31 to Archer Avenue and Sutphin Boulevard. Proposal 2 would have created a new shuttle bus route from Baisley Boulevard and Merrick Boulevard to 168th Street and Hillside Avenue. Proposal 3 would have extended all Merrick Boulevard buses to Archer Avenue with the exception of the Q42, which would be left unchanged.

The NYCTA studied proposals to lower the bus fares so that the combined bus-subway fare would not be greater than the cost of taking the bus directly into Manhattan.

== Station listing ==
Station service legend
Stops all times	Stops 24 hours a day
Stops rush hours in the peak direction only	Stops during weekday rush hours in the peak direction only
Time period details
Disabled access	Station is compliant with the Americans with Disabilities Act
↑	Station is compliant with the Americans with Disabilities Act in the indicated direction only
↓	Station is compliant with the Americans with Disabilities Act in the indicated direction only
	Elevator access to mezzanine only

Neighborhood (approximate)	Disabled access	Station	Tracks	Services	Opened	Transfers and notes
Jamaica	Disabled access	Jamaica Center–York College	all	E J Z	December 11, 1988	Q44 Select Bus Service
Jamaica	Disabled access	Sutphin Boulevard–Archer Avenue–JFK Airport	all	E J Z	December 11, 1988	Q44 Select Bus Service; Connection to LIRR at Jamaica; Connection to AirTrain JFK to JFK Int'l Airport
Jamaica	Merge into BMT Jamaica Line (lower level) (J Z )					
Jamaica	Disabled access	Jamaica–Van Wyck		E	December 11, 1988	
Jamaica	Merge into IND Queens Boulevard Line (upper level) (E )					
