= John F. Kennedy Stadium (disambiguation) =

John F. Kennedy Stadium was a stadium in Philadelphia, Pennsylvania, United States.

John F. Kennedy Stadium may also refer to:

- John F. Kennedy Stadium (Bridgeport), Connecticut, United States
- JFK Stadium (Springfield, Missouri), United States
