= JFK Medical Center =

JFK Medical Center may refer to:

- JFK Medical Center (Atlantis, Florida)
- JFK Medical Center (Edison, New Jersey)
- John F. Kennedy Medical Center (Liberia)
