= John F. Kennedy Elementary School =

John F. Kennedy Elementary School may refer to an elementary school in one of the following districts:

- Newark Unified School District in California
- Southfield Public Schools in Michigan
- Independent School District 196 in Minnesota
- Kennedy Elementary School in Butte, Montana operated by Butte Public Schools
- Brewster Central School District in New York
- Great Neck School District in New York
- West Babylon Union Free School District in New York
- Sioux Falls School District in South Dakota
- Kingsport City Schools in Tennessee
- Grafton School District in Wisconsin
- John F. Kennedy Elementary in Ogdensburg, New York, operated by the Ogdensburg City School District

== See also ==
- Memorials to John F. Kennedy § Schools
