= Sutphin Boulevard–Archer Avenue–JFK Airport station =

New York City Subway station in Queens

Sutphin Blvd–Archer Av–JFK
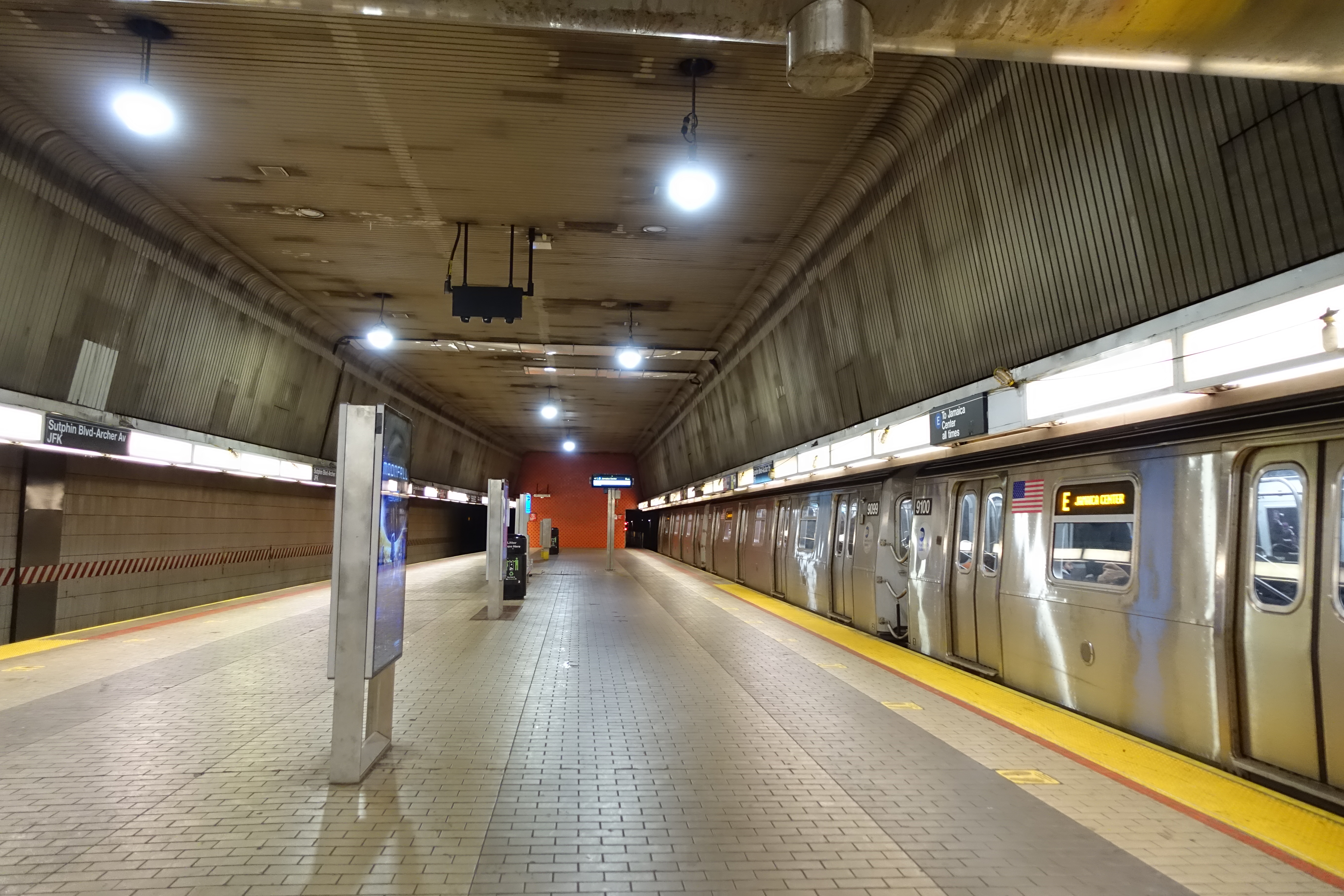
- Upper-level platform with E train

Station statistics
- Address: Sutphin Boulevard and Archer Avenue; Queens, New York
- Borough: Queens
- Locale: Jamaica
- Coordinates: 40.700488°N 73.80774°W
- Division: B (BMT/IND)
- Line: BMT Archer Avenue Line; IND Archer Avenue Line
- Services: E (all times); J (all times); Z (rush hours, peak direction)
- Transit: NYCT Bus: Q1, Q20, Q24, Q30, Q31, Q43, Q44 SBS, Q54, Q56, Q75; MTA Bus: Q6, Q8, Q9, Q25, Q40, Q41, Q60, Q65; AirTrain JFK: Jamaica; LIRR Jamaica station
- Structure: Underground
- Levels: 2
- Platforms: 2 island platforms (1 on each level)
- Tracks: 4 (2 on each level)

Other information
- Opened: December 11, 1988; 37 years ago
- Accessible: Yes
- Former/other names: Sutphin Boulevard

Traffic
- 2025: 7,148,144 ▲11%
- Rank: 31 out of 423
Services
| Preceding station | New York City Subway | Following station |
|---|---|---|
| Jamaica–Van Wyck E toward World Trade Center | E (New York City Subway service) | Jamaica Center–York College E J Z Terminus |
| 111th Street J skip-stop | J/Z (New York City Subway service) | Jamaica Center–York College E J Z Terminus |
| 121st Street J Z toward Broad Street | J/Z (New York City Subway service) | Jamaica Center–York College E J Z Terminus |
Location
Location within New York City Subway
Location within New York City
Location within New York
Track layout
Upper level
Lower level
Street map
Station service legend
| Symbol | Description |
| Stops all times | Stops in station at all times |
| Stops all times except late nights | Stops all times except late nights |
| Stops late nights only | Stops late nights only |
| Stops late nights and weekends | Stops late nights and weekends only |
| Stops weekdays during the day | Stops weekdays during the day |
| Stops weekends during the day | Stops weekends during the day |
| Stops all times except rush hours in the peak direction | Stops all times except rush hours in the peak direction |
| Stops all times except weekdays in the peak direction | Stops all times except weekdays in the peak direction |
| Stops daily except rush hours in the peak direction | Stops all times except nights and rush hours in the peak direction |
| Stops rush hours only | Stops rush hours only |
| Stops rush hours in the peak direction only | Stops rush hours in the peak direction only |
| Station closed | Station is closed |
(Details about time periods)

The Sutphin Boulevard–Archer Avenue–JFK Airport station is a two-level station on the IND and BMT Archer Avenue Lines of the New York City Subway. It is located at the intersection of Sutphin Boulevard and Archer Avenue in Jamaica, Queens. It is served by the E and J trains at all times, as well as the Z train during rush hours in the peak direction. This station has four tracks and two island platforms, with two platform levels: E trains are on the upper level while J and Z trains are on the lower level.

The station was planned as part of the construction of IND and BMT's Archer Avenue Line as outlined in the Program for Action in 1968. The construction began around 1982 and it was opened to service on December 11, 1988. Originally named Sutphin Boulevard, it served as a replacement for the former Sutphin Boulevard elevated station on the demolished segment of the BMT Jamaica Line two blocks north. In 2003, when the AirTrain JFK opened at the adjacent Jamaica station, the JFK Airport suffix was added. The station is announced as Sutphin Boulevard–Archer Avenue–JFK on E trains and Sutphin Boulevard–JFK Airport on J and Z trains.

== History ==
The plans for the Archer Avenue Lines emerged in the 1960s under the city and MTA's Program for Action. Because of the 1975 New York City fiscal crisis, the Archer Avenue Line's construction was delayed. Design on the station started on October 1, 1974, and was completed on February 24, 1982, by Hellmuth, Obata & Kassabaum. Bids on the station's construction were received on July 9, 1982, and the contract was awarded to Carlin-Atlas Corporation for $17.91 million. Work on the station started on July 15, 1982, and opened along with the rest of the Archer Avenue Line on December 11, 1988.

In 2003, when the AirTrain opened, this station was renamed as Sutphin Boulevard–Archer Avenue–JFK Airport, as the station connects with the AirTrain at Jamaica Station.

In 2020, the MTA announced that it would reconstruct the track and third rail on the IND Archer Avenue Line, which had become deteriorated. From September 19 to November 2, 2020, E service was cut back to Jamaica–Van Wyck, with a shuttle bus connecting to Sutphin Boulevard and Jamaica Center. The MTA then announced it would reconstruct the track on the BMT Archer Avenue Line. Starting on July 1, 2022, J service was cut back to 121st Street, and Z service was temporarily discontinued, with a shuttle bus connecting to Sutphin Boulevard and Jamaica Center. The work was completed in September 2022.

The MTA announced in December 2021 that it would install wide-aisle fare gates for disabled passengers at five subway stations, including Sutphin Boulevard, by mid-2022. The implementation of these fare gates was delayed; the MTA's chief accessibility officer indicated in February 2023 that the new fare gates would be installed at the Sutphin Boulevard–Archer Avenue–JFK Airport and Atlantic Avenue–Barclays Center stations shortly afterward. On December 4, 2023, wide aisle turnstiles were installed, making the station the first in the New York City Subway system to have such turnstiles. A customer service center at the station opened the same month. The station was cleaned and repaired in 2024 as part of the MTA's Re-New-Vation program. In October 2026, the MTA announced plans to install taller fare gates with glass panels at 20 additional stations, including extra gates at the Sutphin Boulevard–Archer Avenue–JFK Airport station.

Additionally, in February 2022, the MTA announced that the IND platform (but not the BMT platform) would receive platform screen doors as part of a pilot program involving three stations. The announcement came after several people had been shoved onto tracks, including one incident that led to a woman's death at another station. The MTA started soliciting bids from platform-door manufacturers in mid-2022; the doors were planned to be installed starting in December 2023 at a cost of $6 million. Designs for the platform doors were being finalized by June 2023.

== Station layout ==
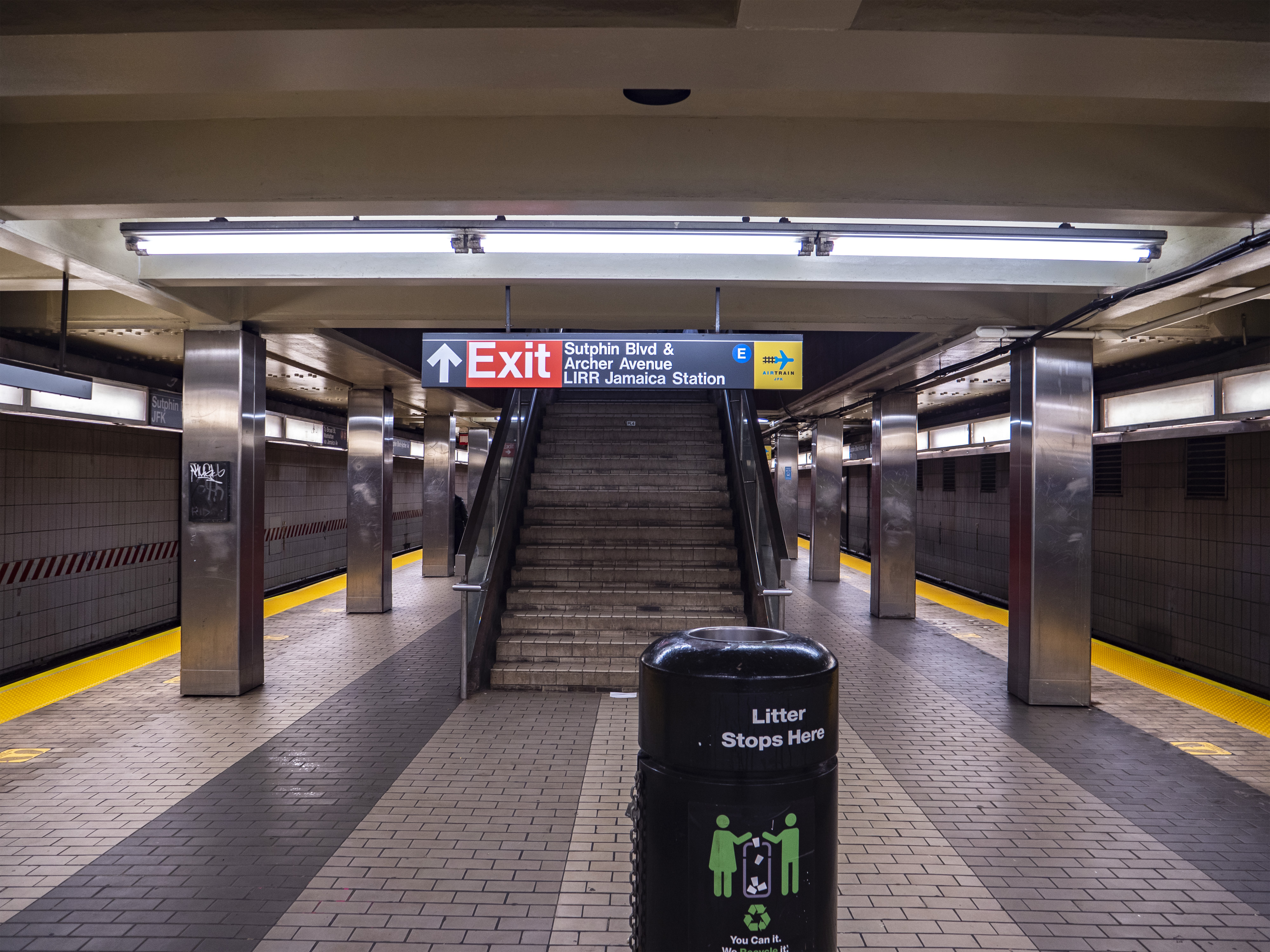
Lower level platform

The Sutphin Boulevard–Archer Avenue–JFK Airport station contains two levels, each with two tracks and an island platform. The E train serves the upper level (IND) at all times. The J and Z trains serve the lower level (BMT); the former operates all times and the latter operates during rush hours in the peak direction. The next stop to the west is Jamaica–Van Wyck for E trains, 121st Street for local J and skip-stop Z trains, and 111th Street for skip-stop J trains. The next stop to the east is Jamaica Center–York College. Like the other stations on the Archer Avenue Line, Sutphin Boulevard is fully ADA-accessible. Both platforms are 600 feet (183 m) in length, standard for a full-length B Division train.

As with other stations constructed as part of the Program for Action, the Sutphin Boulevard–Archer Avenue–JFK Airport station contained technologically advanced features such as air-cooling, noise insulation, CCTV monitors, public announcement systems, electronic platform signage, and escalator and elevator entrances. This station had six escalators and two elevators when it opened. The station's mezzanine is located above the IND platform under the intersection of Sutphin Boulevard and Archer Avenue.

There are gray vertical acoustic tile side walls and a glassed-in crossover. The mezzanine is glass and stainless steel and features a "Sutphin" mosaic on the geographic north wall. The station's tiling scheme is creme along the platform walls, with some patches of maroon and orange tiling in various places.

=== Exits ===
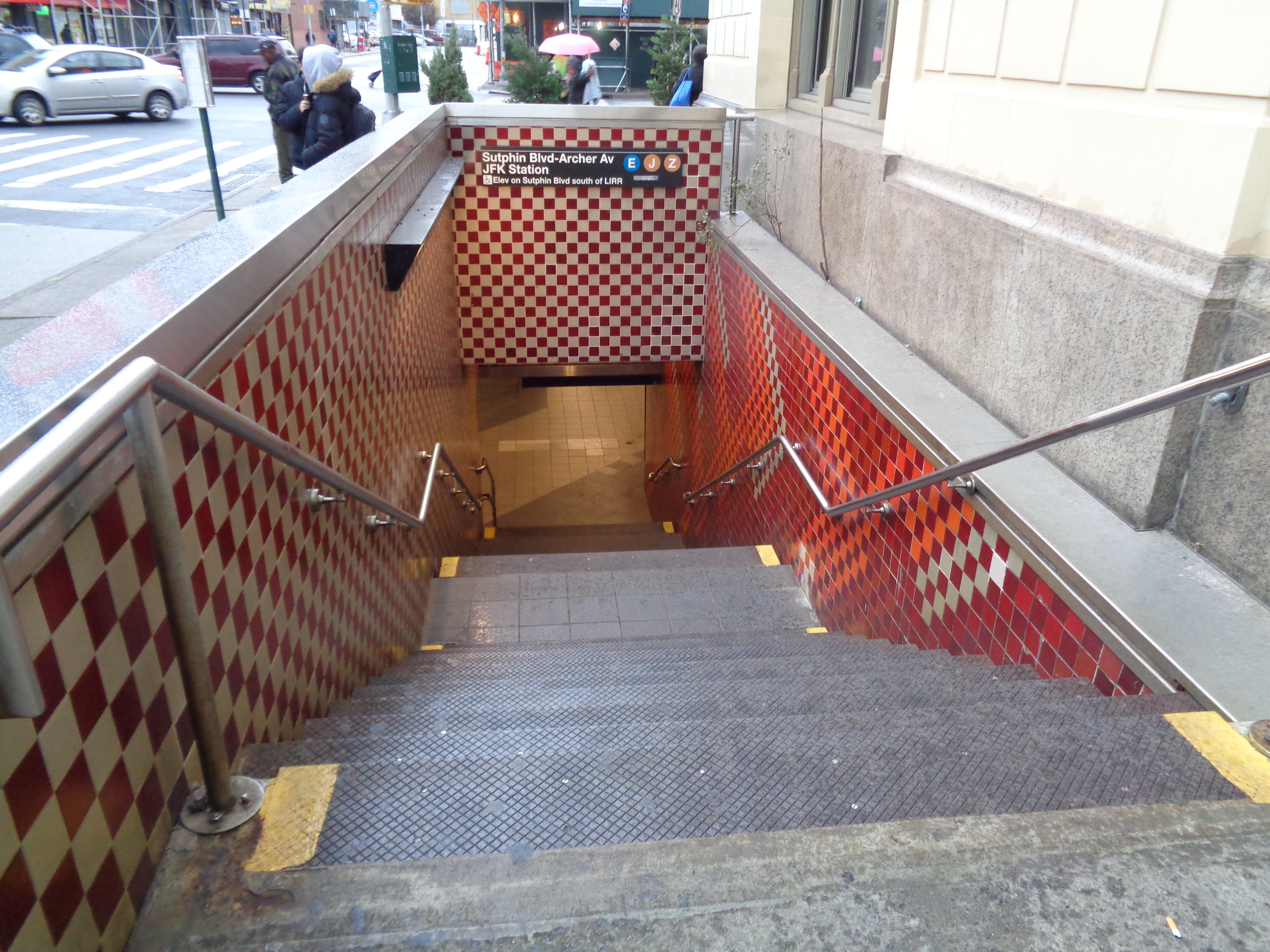
Subway entrance next to the Jamaica station

Stairs go up to all four corners of Sutphin Boulevard and Archer Avenue. The two northern staircases go down to an unstaffed fare control area, which as of 2007 consists of four High Entry-Exit Turnstiles. The full-time fare control area is at the southern end and includes seven regular turnstiles. On the southeast corner, two escalators (one up, one down) and a staircase lead to street level, just outside the Long Island Rail Road (LIRR)'s Jamaica station. Additional staircases lead from street level to each of the LIRR platform. Three elevators provide access to the street level and the LIRR station's main mezzanine areas. Connection is also available to AirTrain JFK, which provides service to John F. Kennedy International Airport; the AirTrain JFK also has its own entrance from the street just south of the LIRR station. As part of upgrades to the Jamaica Transportation Center Station Plaza, two new subway station entrances, with canopies, are planned to be constructed as of 2016.

== Ridership ==
In 1990, after the Archer Avenue line opened, the station had 2,491,760 boardings. By 2007, the ridership in this station had more than doubled to 6.064 million annual passengers. In 2018, the station had 7,282,128 boardings, making it the 146th most used station in the 423-station system. This amounted to an average of 23,388 passengers per weekday.

== Bus and rail connections ==
There are connections to the Long Island Rail Road and AirTrain JFK at Jamaica station.

New York City Bus routes Q1, Q20, Q24, Q30, Q31, Q43, Q44 SBS, Q54, Q56, Q75 and MTA Bus routes Q6, Q8, Q9, Q25, Q40, Q41, Q60 and Q65 also stop at the station.

== Gallery ==
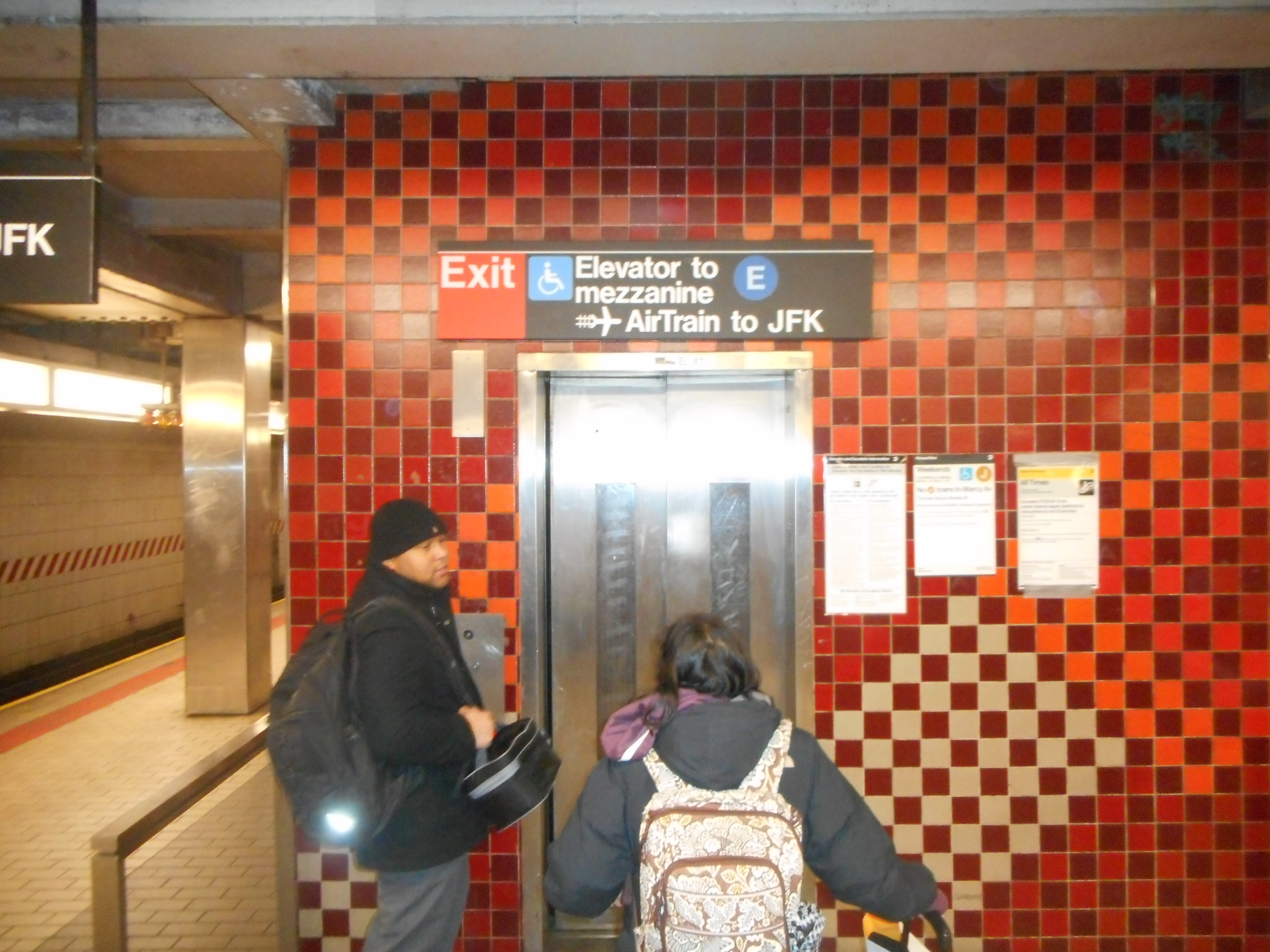
A view of the elevator leading to the upper level and mezzanine

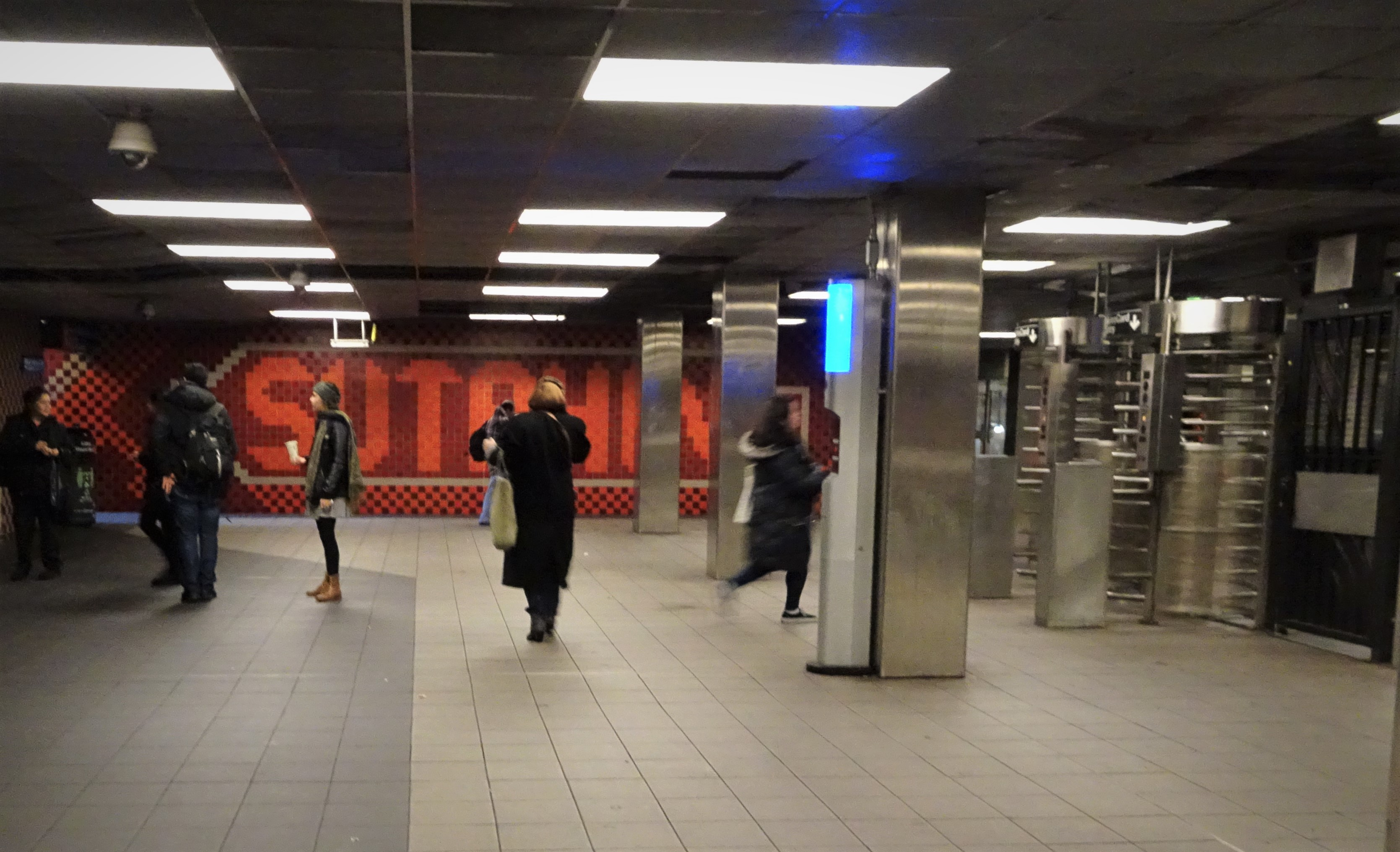
A view of the mezzanine with the "SUTPHIN" mosaic

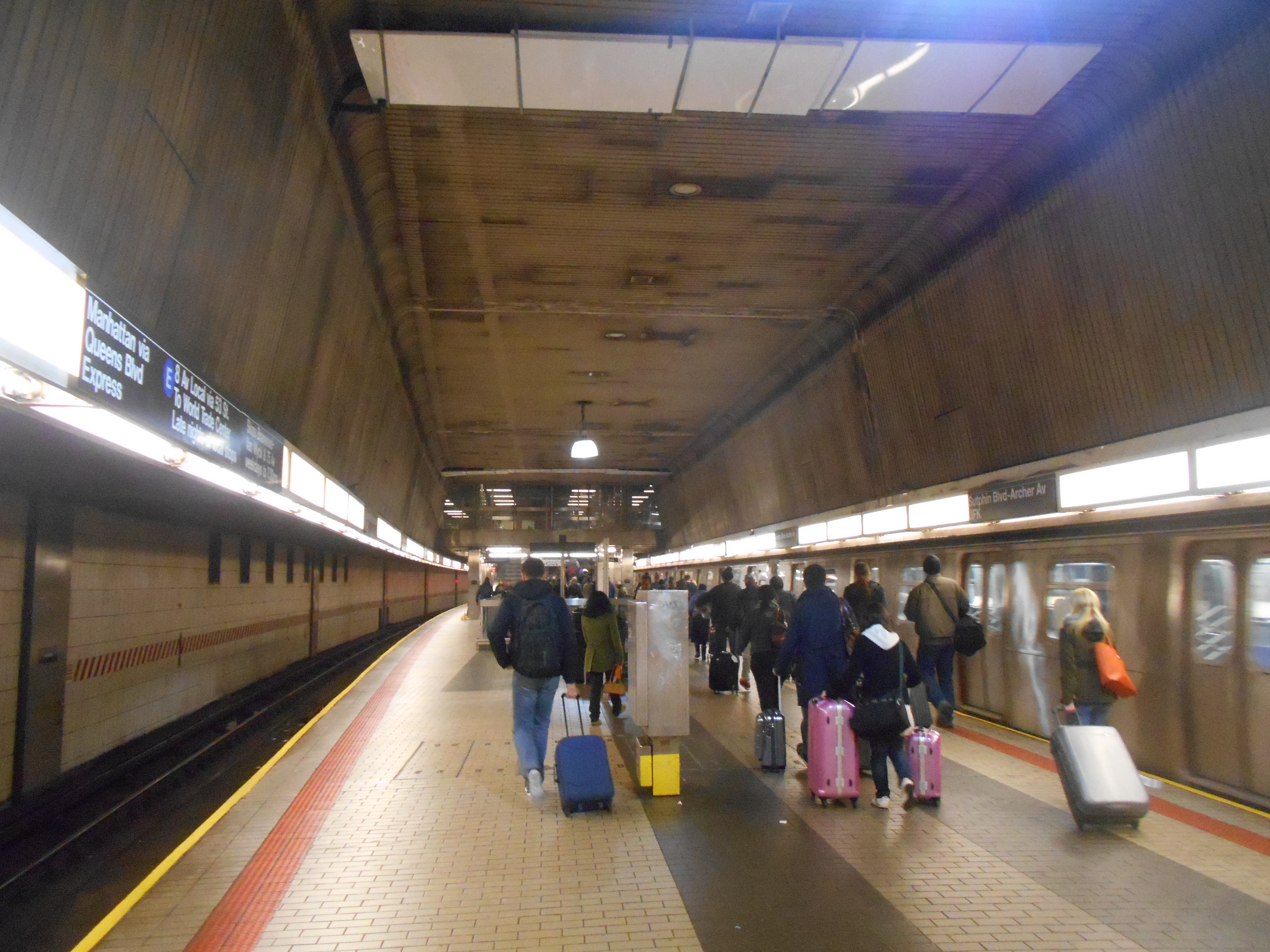
A view of passengers at the upper level, exiting an E train with luggage and heading for the AirTrain to JFK Airport
