= John F. Kennedy Memorial Airport =

- IATA: ASX; ICAO: KASX; FAA LID: ASX

Summary
- Airport type: Public
- Owner: City & County of Ashland
- Serves: Ashland, Wisconsin
- Opened: September 1958
- Time zone: CST (UTC−06:00)
  - Summer (DST): CDT (UTC−05:00)
- Elevation AMSL: 827 ft (252 m)
- Coordinates: 46°32′55″N 090°55′08″W

Map
- Location of airport in Wisconsin ASX (the United States)

Runways
Direction	Length		Surface
Direction	ft	m	Surface
2/20	5,197	1,584	Asphalt
13/31	3,498	1,066	Asphalt

Statistics
- Aircraft operations (2022): 10,525
- Based aircraft (2024): 24
- Source: Federal Aviation Administration

John F. Kennedy Memorial Airport (IATA: ASX, ICAO: KASX, FAA LID: ASX) is a city and county-owned public-use airport located two nautical miles (4 km) southwest of the central business district of Ashland, a city in Ashland County, Wisconsin, United States. It is also known as JFK Memorial Airport.

It is included in the Federal Aviation Administration (FAA) National Plan of Integrated Airport Systems for 2025–2029, in which it is categorized as a local general aviation facility.

== Facilities and aircraft ==
John F. Kennedy Memorial Airport covers an area of 511 acres (207 ha) at an elevation of 827 feet (252 m) above mean sea level. It has two runways with asphalt surfaces: the primary runway 2/20 is 5,197 by 100 feet (1,584 x 30 m) with approved LOC and GPS approaches and the crosswind runway 13/31 is 3,498 by 75 feet (1,066 x 23 m) with approved GPS approaches.

For the 12-month period ending August 23, 2022, the airport had 10,525 aircraft operations, an average of 29 per day: 95% general aviation and 5% air taxi. In August 2024, there were 24 aircraft based at this airport: 21 single-engine, 2 multi-engine and 1 jet.

== See also ==
- List of airports in Wisconsin
- List of memorials to John F. Kennedy
