= Cleveland Street station =

New York City Subway station in Brooklyn

Cleveland Street
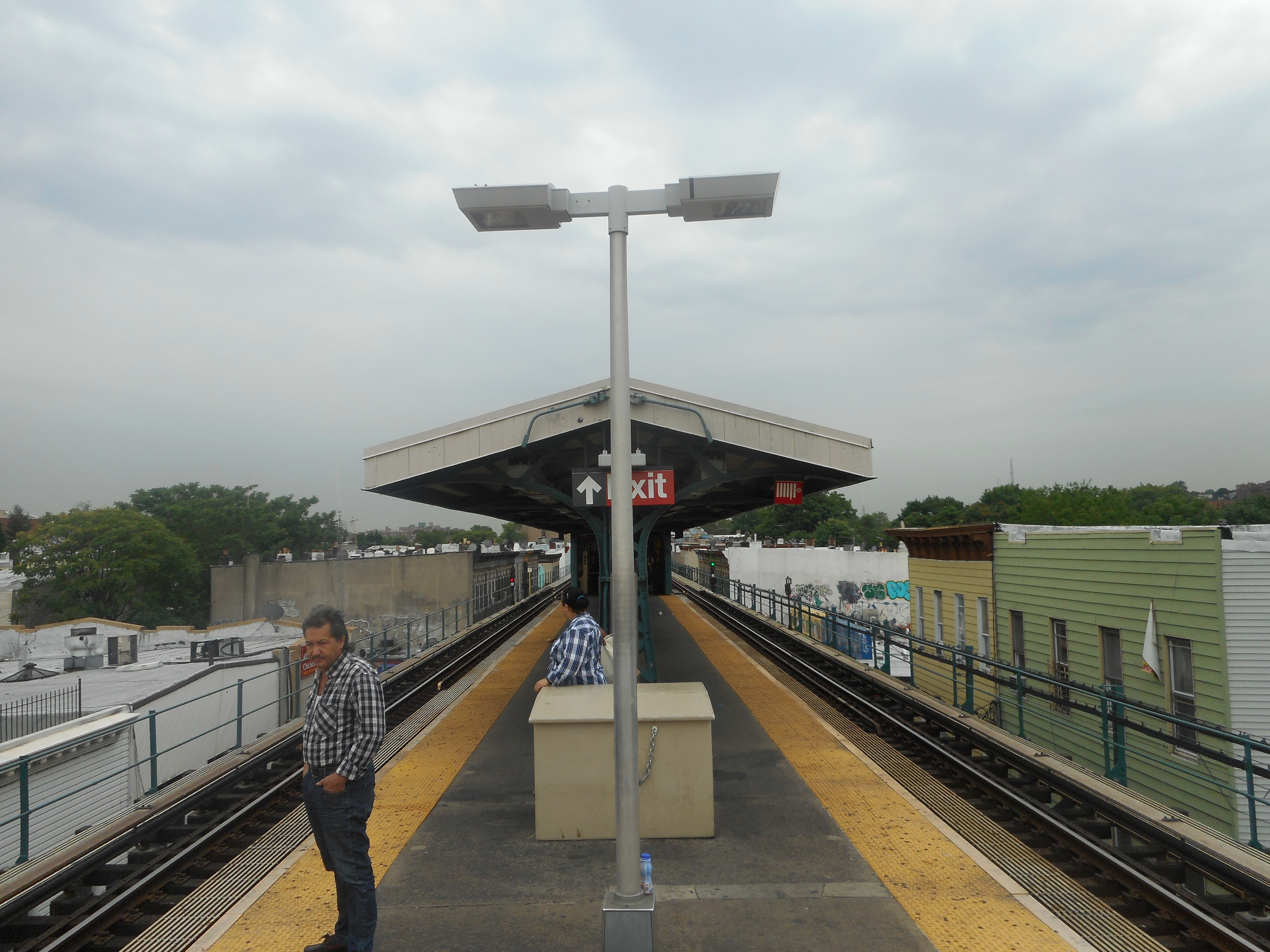
- The west end of the platform

Station statistics
- Address: Cleveland Street and Fulton Street; Brooklyn, New York
- Borough: Brooklyn
- Locale: Cypress Hills
- Coordinates: 40.679629°N 73.885589°W
- Division: B (BMT)
- Line: BMT Jamaica Line
- Services: J (all times)
- Transit: NYCT Bus: Q24
- Structure: Elevated
- Platforms: 1 island platform
- Tracks: 2

Other information
- Opened: May 30, 1893; 133 years ago

Traffic
- 2025: 507,869 ▲22.2%
- Rank: 394 out of 423
Services
Preceding station	New York City Subway	Following station
Alabama Avenue J skip-stop	J/Z (New York City Subway service)	Crescent Street J skip-stop
Van Siclen Avenue J toward Broad Street	J/Z (New York City Subway service)	Norwood Avenue J toward Jamaica Center–York College
does not stop here
Location
Location within New York City Subway
Location within New York City
Location within New York
Track layout
Street map
Station service legend
Symbol	Description
Stops all times except rush hours in the peak direction	Stops all times except rush hours in the peak direction
Stops rush hours in the peak direction only	Stops rush hours in the peak direction only

The Cleveland Street station (formerly the Cleveland Avenue station) is a skip-stop station on the BMT Jamaica Line of the New York City Subway in Brooklyn. It is served by the J train at all times. The Z train skips this station when it operates.

== History ==
This elevated station was originally built by the Brooklyn Elevated Railroad as the first station to be built along the Cypress Hills extension of the Lexington Avenue Elevated line, which was also shared by the Broadway Elevated east of Gates Avenue. The station opened on May 30, 1893. The station has been exclusively for the Jamaica Line since the closure of the Lexington Avenue Line on October 13, 1950.

The station was closed for renovations in the mid-2000s. As part of the station renovation project, the stairs were rehabilitated, the floors were renewed, major structural repairs were made, new canopies were installed, the area around the station booth was reconfigured, the platform edge strips were replaced, walls were replaced, and a high-quality public address system was installed. The renovation cost $8.41 million.

== Station layout ==
The station has two tracks and one island platform. The canopy is located at the west end of the platform and is short and has arched supports.

=== Exit ===
The station's only entrance and exit is a station house at the west end of the platform. It has a bank of two turnstiles, token booth, and one staircase going down to an elevated passageway beneath the tracks. Outside of fare control, there are two stairs, one to each western corner of Fulton and Cleveland Streets.

== See also ==
- Substation 401
