= Broadway Local =

Broadway Local is the name of the following subway services in New York City:

- 1 (Broadway-Seventh Avenue Local)
- R (Broadway Local)
- W (Broadway Local)
- Broadway Brooklyn Local, former service between Manhattan and eastern Brooklyn
