= Alabama Avenue station =

New York City Subway station in Brooklyn

Alabama Avenue
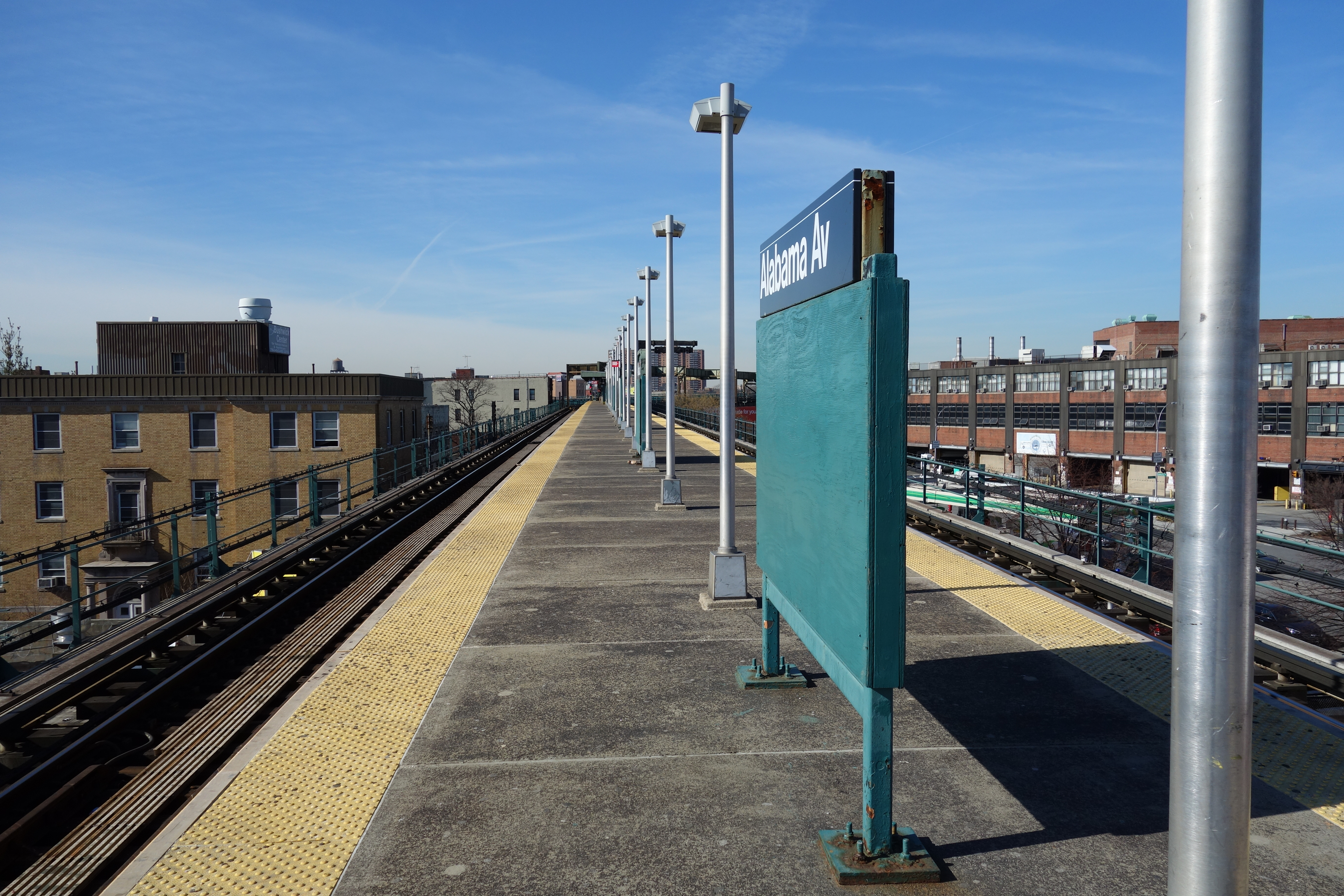
- Looking west from the platform

Station statistics
- Address: Alabama Avenue and Fulton Street; Brooklyn, New York
- Borough: Brooklyn
- Locale: Cypress Hills
- Coordinates: 40.67683°N 73.900008°W
- Division: B (BMT)
- Line: BMT Jamaica Line
- Services: J (all times); Z (rush hours, peak direction)
- Transit: NYCT Bus: B12, B20, B25, B83, Q24, Q56
- Structure: Elevated
- Platforms: 1 island platform
- Tracks: 2

Other information
- Opened: September 5, 1885 (141 years ago)

Traffic
- 2025: 433,043 ▲16.8%
- Rank: 400 out of 423
Services
| Preceding station | New York City Subway | Following station |
|---|---|---|
| Broadway Junction J Z toward Broad Street | J/Z (New York City Subway service) | Van Siclen Avenue J Z toward Jamaica Center–York College |
| Broadway Junction J Z toward Broad Street | J/Z (New York City Subway service) | Van Siclen Avenue J Z toward Jamaica Center–York College |
| Broadway Junction J Z toward Broad Street | J/Z (New York City Subway service) | Cleveland Street J skip-stop |
Location
Location within New York City Subway
Location within New York City
Location within New York
Track layout
Street map
Station service legend
| Symbol | Description |
| Stops all times except rush hours in the peak direction | Stops all times except rush hours in the peak direction |
| Stops rush hours in the peak direction only | Stops rush hours in the peak direction only |
| Stops all times | Stops all times |

The Alabama Avenue station is an elevated station on the BMT Jamaica Line of the New York City Subway. Located at the intersection of Alabama Avenue and Fulton Street in Cypress Hills, Brooklyn, it is served by the J train at all times and the Z train during rush hours in the peak direction.

== History ==
On September 5, 1885, the Brooklyn Elevated Railway was extended to Alabama Avenue, with 1,500 passengers using the station during the morning of its first day of service.

In 1985, the station had only 321 paying daily riders on a typical weekday not counting farebeaters, making it one of the least used stations in the system.

The station was closed for renovations from January 13 to December 14, 2005. As part of the station renovation project, the stairs were rehabilitated, the floors were renewed, major structural repairs were made, new canopies were installed, the area around the station booth was reconfigured, the platform edge strips were replaced, walls were replaced, and a high-quality public address system was installed. The renovation cost $8.89 million.

Prior to May 2014, Alabama Avenue was a skip-stop station where only J trains stopped during weekday rush hours in the peak direction. By May 2014, all J and Z trains began stopping at this station.

== Station layout ==
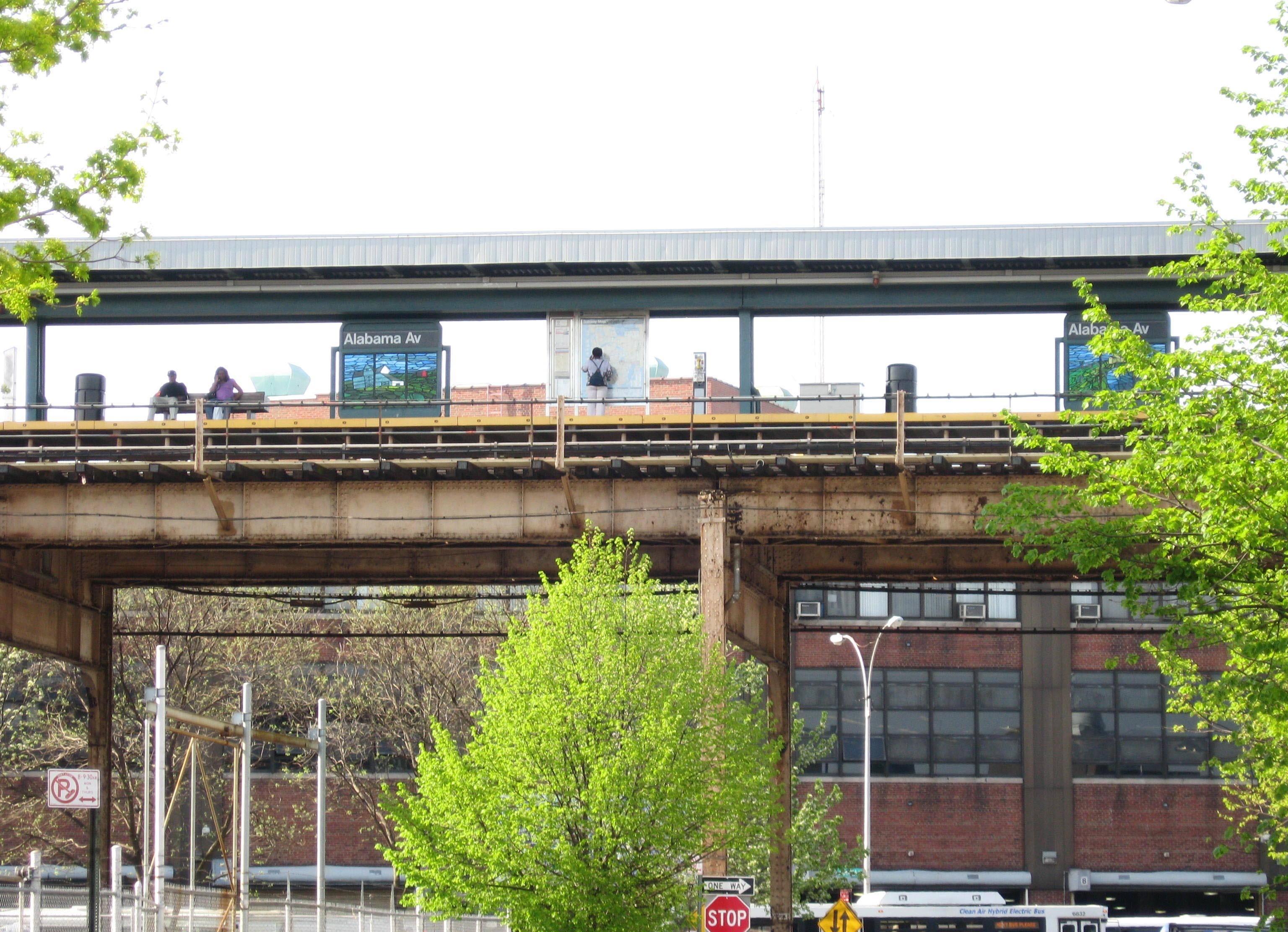
The station as seen from street level

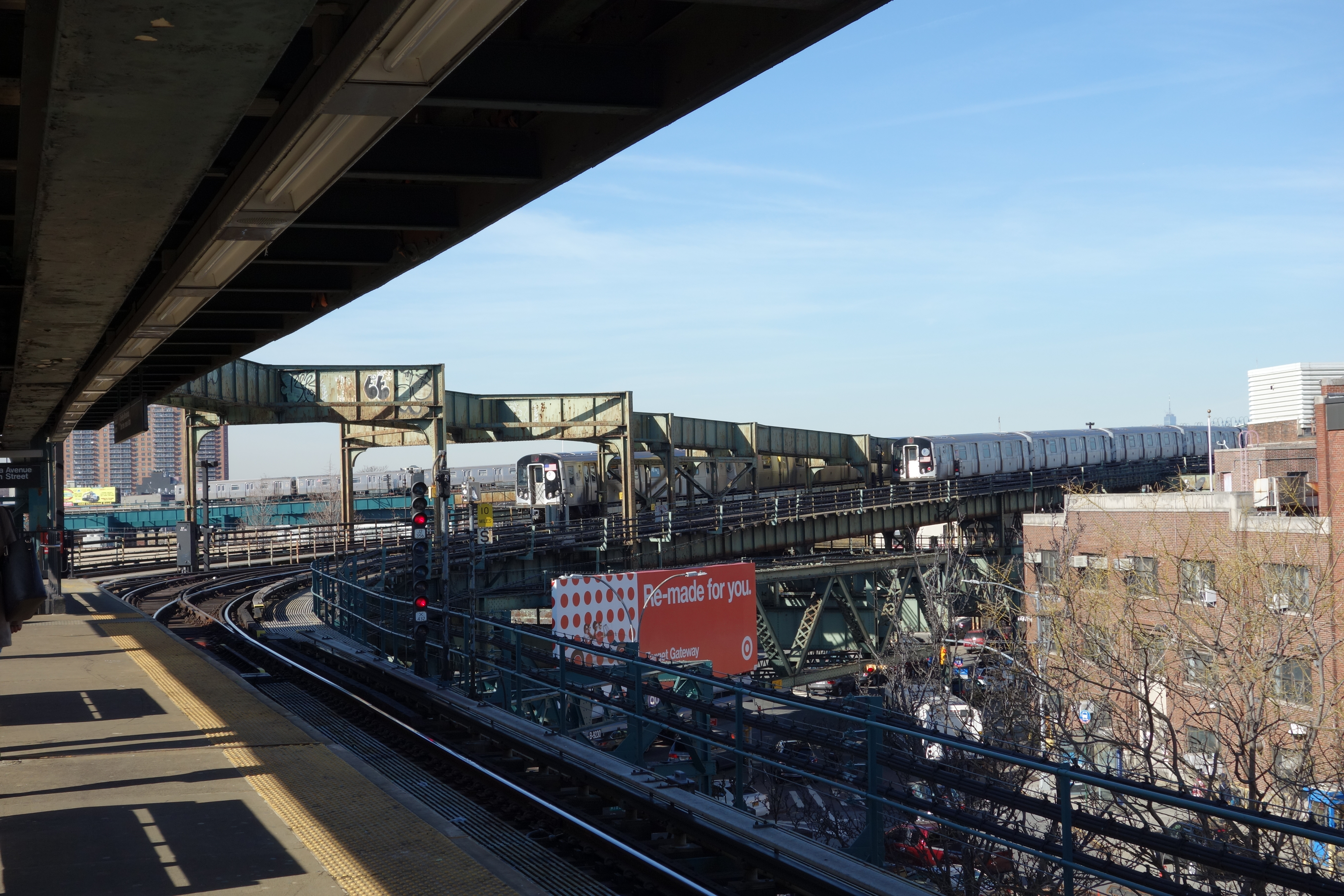
Looking northwest at the express trackway

This elevated station has one island platform and two tracks. The platform has a red canopy with green frames and support columns at the west (railroad south) end.

A trackway starts at the top of the station's flat canopy and runs to the elevated complex at Broadway Junction. This track was intended to be an express track, with work beginning on the proposed express track in the late 1960s. However, engineering studies completed after the work started indicated that the vibration of trains passing over the stations would be too severe and would literally shake the stations apart.

A nameless artwork by Scott Redden was installed here in 2008. It consists of three stained glass panels in eight of the nine station sign structures on the platform. The panels depict scenes related to farming including a farmhouse, chicken, and pick-up truck.

The street area under the station was depicted in a painting created by artist Rackstraw Downes, titled "Under the J Line at Alabama Avenue, 2007."

=== Exits ===
The station's only entrance/exit is an elevated station house beneath the tracks. It has one staircase to the platform at the south end, turnstile bank, token booth, and two staircases facing in opposite directions going down to the southeast corner of Alabama Avenue and Fulton Street.
