= Norwood Avenue station =

New York City Subway station in Brooklyn

Norwood Avenue
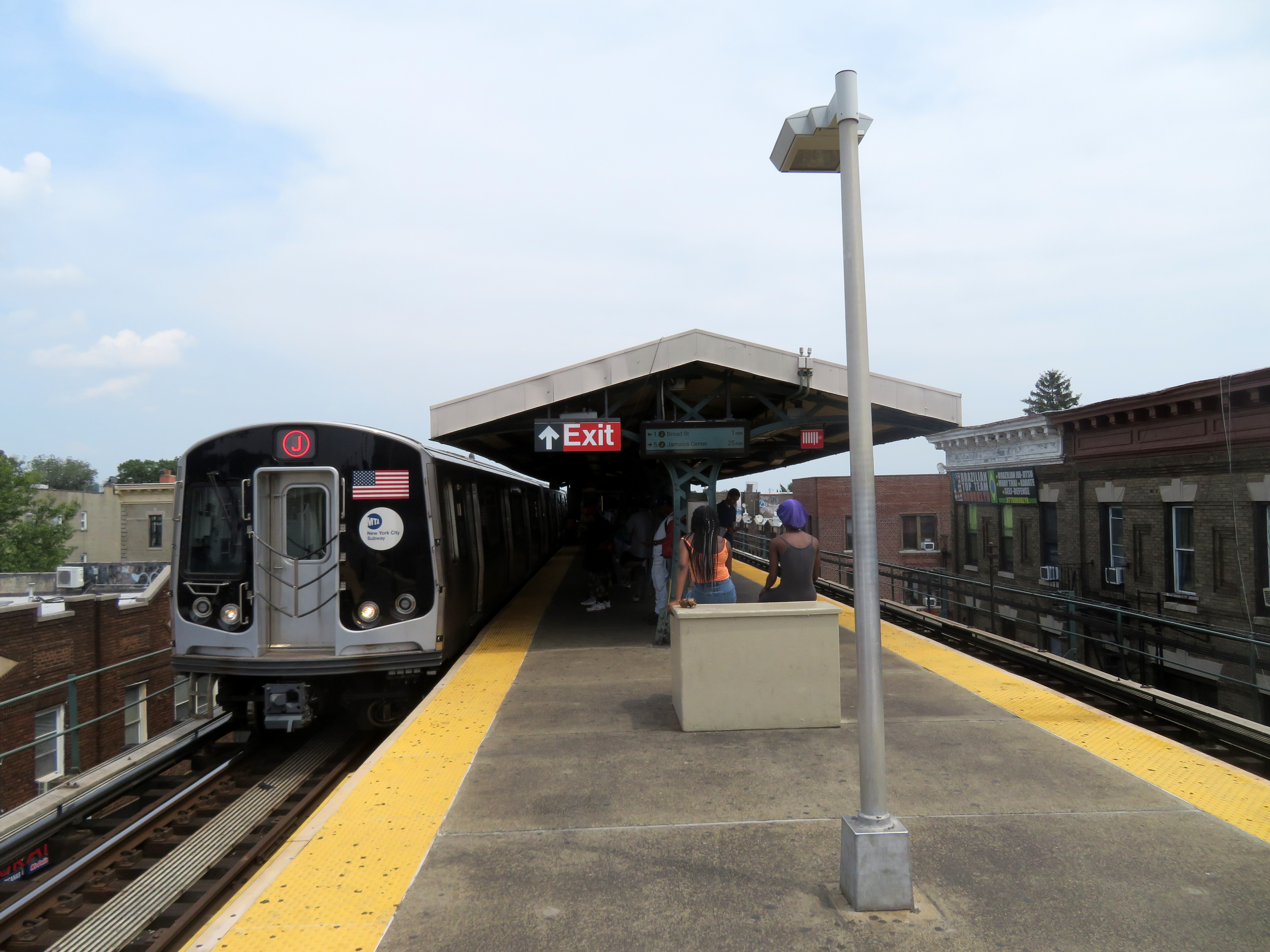
- Manhattan-bound R179 J train in 2019

Station statistics
- Address: Norwood Avenue and Fulton Street; Brooklyn, New York
- Borough: Brooklyn
- Locale: Cypress Hills
- Coordinates: 40.681582°N 73.879151°W
- Division: B (BMT)
- Line: BMT Jamaica Line
- Services: J (all except rush hours, peak direction); Z (rush hours, peak direction)
- Transit: NYCT Bus: Q24
- Structure: Elevated
- Platforms: 1 island platform
- Tracks: 2

Other information
- Opened: May 30, 1893 (133 years ago)
- Accessible: No; under construction

Traffic
- 2025: 571,549 ▲22.4%
- Rank: 378 out of 423
Services
| Preceding station | New York City Subway | Following station |
|---|---|---|
| Van Siclen Avenue Z skip-stop | J/Z (New York City Subway service) | Crescent Street J Z toward Jamaica Center–York College |
| Cleveland Street J toward Broad Street | J/Z (New York City Subway service) | Crescent Street J Z toward Jamaica Center–York College |
Former services
| Preceding station | Brooklyn Rapid Transit | Following station |
|---|---|---|
| Cleveland Street toward Chambers Street | Union Elevated Broadway Line | Crescent Street toward 111th Street |
| Cleveland Street toward Chambers Street | Union Elevated Broadway Line | Woodhaven Junction 1898–1917 toward Rockaway Park |
Location
Location within New York City Subway
Location within New York City
Location within New York
Track layout
Street map
Station service legend
| Symbol | Description |
| Stops all times except rush hours in the peak direction | Stops all times except rush hours in the peak direction |
| Stops rush hours in the peak direction only | Stops rush hours in the peak direction only |
| Stops all times | Stops all times |

The Norwood Avenue station is a skip-stop station on the BMT Jamaica Line of the New York City Subway. Located at the intersection of Norwood Avenue and Fulton Street in Cypress Hills, Brooklyn, it is served by the J train at all times except rush hours in the peak direction, when the Z train takes over service.

== History ==
This station was opened on May 30, 1893 as part of the Brooklyn Elevated Railroad's four stop extension of the Lexington Avenue Line to Cypress Hills.

From July 18, 2005 to March 13, 2006 this station was closed for rehabilitation. As part of the rehabilitation project, the stairs were rehabilitated, the floors were renewed, major structural repairs were made, new canopies were installed, the area around the station booth was reconfigured, the platform edge strips were replaced, walls were replaced, and a high-quality public address system was installed. The renovation cost $8.40 million.

In 2019, the Metropolitan Transportation Authority announced that this station would become ADA-accessible as part of the agency's 2020–2024 Capital Program. The MTA received $254 million from the Federal Transit Administration in 2023 for accessibility upgrades to four subway stations, including the Norwood Avenue station. Work on new elevators began in December 2024.

== Station layout ==
This elevated station has two tracks and one island platform. The platform has a short red canopy with green frames and support columns at the east (railroad north) end and silver lampposts and black station sign structures for the rest of the length.

The 2007 artwork here is called "Culture Swirl" by Margaret Lazetta, It consists of stained glass artwork of various images on the platform sign structures, as of March 2022, The artwork has been covered up with green pained wood for reasons unknown.

Joint service with the Long Island Rail Road's Atlantic Branch existed between Norwood Avenue and Crescent Street stations with a connection built at Chestnut Street in Brooklyn. This allowed BRT trains to access the Rockaways and Manhattan Beach while affording the LIRR a connection into Manhattan to the BRT terminal located at Park Row over the Brooklyn Bridge (this service predated the opening of the East River Tunnels to Penn Station). This service ended in 1917 when the United States Railroad Administration took over the LIRR, and classified different operating standards between rapid transit trains and regular heavy rail railroads such as the LIRR.

=== Exit ===
The station's sole entrance/exit is a station house connected to the platform at the extreme east end. It has a bank of three turnstiles, token booth, and one staircase going down to an elevated passageway beneath the tracks, where two staircases go down to either eastern corners of Norwood Avenue and Fulton Street.

As part of the work to install ADA-accessible elevators at the station, a new entrance is expected to be built near the middle of the station, with one staircase and the elevator going down to the east side of Hale Avenue, between Arlington Avenue and Fulton Street.
