= Limited-stop =

Public transport trip pattern

In public transit, a limited-stop (or sometimes referred to as semi-fast) service is typically a train that skips some stations served by local or all-stations trains, but stops more frequently than a true express.

The term is normally used on routes with a mixture of locals, limited-stops, and expresses; the specific difference between local trains, limited stop services, and expresses varies by region and operator. A pair of limited-stop services which each skip alternating minor stations while both calling at major destinations and interchanges can form a skip-stop service.

== Railways ==
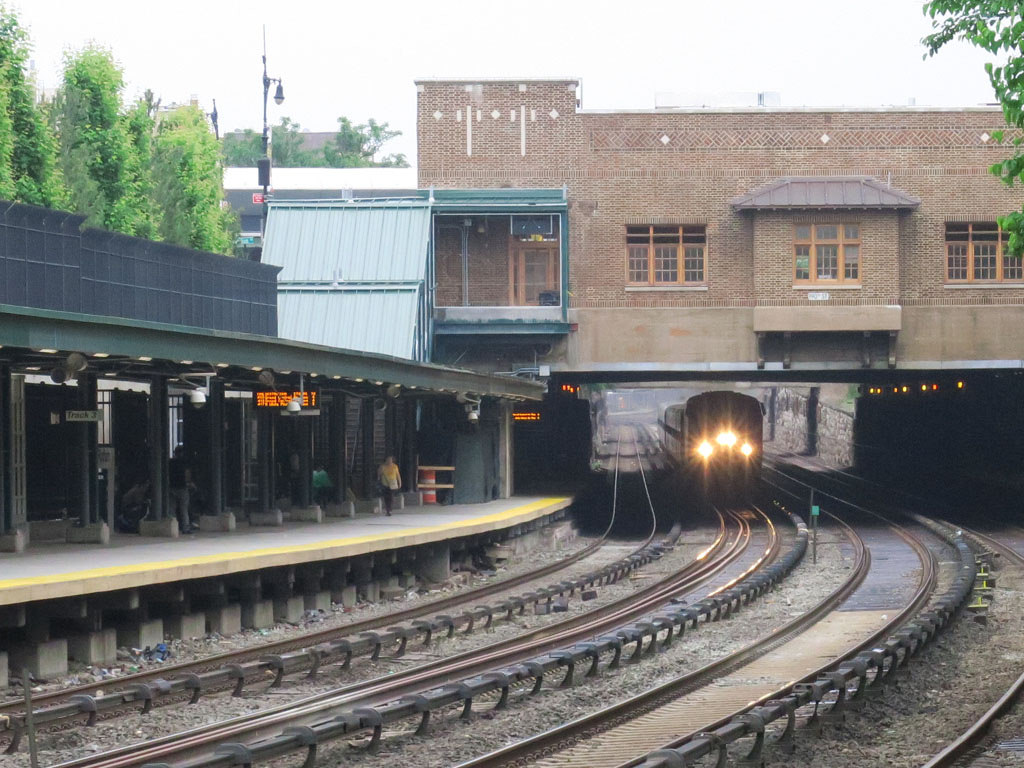
This approaching train will not stop at this station.

On railways, the layout of the tracks and number and length of platforms at stations normally limit the extent to which a blend of fast/semi-fast/slow services can be operated.

=== Australia ===
In Australia, particularly in Brisbane and Sydney, limited stop services are formed by commuter trains that run as limited stops or express services from the city centre to the edge of the suburban area and then as all stops in the interurban area (an example of such an express pattern can be seen on the Gold Coast line and the East Hills line).

=== Finland ===
In Helsinki, Finland, VR commuter rail services are formed by trains that run as limited stops or express from the city centre and then stop all stations in the interurban area. The Y train is one such example.

=== Japan ===
In Japan, the limited stops train is known as a semi-express train (準急 Junkyū). An example is applied to Nankai Railway's Koya Line.

=== United Kingdom ===
In the United Kingdom, some railway stations have tracks for which there are no platforms, allowing a larger number of fast trains to pass them without stopping. They may go down the middle of the station or down the side such as at Forest Hill, Raynes Park, Kentish Town and Totnes (the middle track at Totnes is used only in the summer by Great Western Railway services between London Paddington and Newquay).

=== United States ===
In the United States, some railway stations have tracks for which there are no platforms. For instance, various commuter rail services run along the same tracks as Amtrak's Acela Express and Northeast Corridor routes with four rails, two in the middle for Amtrak, and two on either side for the commuter rail. There are also Express services within those, as at many smaller stations, the Northeast Corridor trains will split off onto the commuter rail tracks to make a stop, and the Acela trains will continue.

==== Subways ====
The United States also uniquely has subways that use this method. In New York City, services are designated as separate lines, which are often part-express, part-local, while others are only express at certain times of day, for example the J and Z services. In Philadelphia, they are considered the same line, but with a few different types of services. The B has the local (B1), which makes all stops; the express (B2), which has an early Southern terminus in the city center; the spur (B3), which makes a few more stops than the express but less than the local, and then branches out to service two other stations), and the special, which is run only during sporting events, and runs as the express but then continues nonstop down to the southern terminus of the local, sharing tracks with the local.

== Buses ==
Traditionally, limited-stop bus services usually operate on an identical or similar route to one or more local bus routes, only serving primary stops, and skipping the others served by local routes. Typically, the stops that are served by limited stop routes are chosen so that stops are evenly spaced or are transfer points, major intersections, or popular destinations. Within downtowns, limited-stop services may stop more frequently. Depending on the transit agency, this can sometimes be referred to as express service. For example, Chicago Transit Authority refers to both this type and non-stop services as express.

Limited-stop bus service is a core component of bus rapid transit (BRT), but differs by not sharing most of the common features of bus rapid transit such as unique route branding, off-vehicle fare collection, signal preemption, frequent all-day service, and dedicated right-of-way. For example, the RapidRide lines in Seattle, Washington are existing local King County Metro routes but with fewer stops and some BRT features being adopted at some stations. In other cities, such as Hong Kong, limited stop bus service currently uses the same branding and has the same features (except stopping less frequently) as regular bus routes.

Other forms of limited-stop bus service other than the traditional type characterized by serving only some of the stops. Some bus routes with portions of the route are non-stop are referred to as limited stop by the transit agency that operates the route.

One form is a route that operates partially on a highway. It is more similar to an express bus route than the traditional limited stop route. However, the non-stop portion of the route is typically shorter than that of an express route, and the fare structure of the transit agency cause a limited stop route to have a lower fare than an express route.

One example of this type of route would be Metro Transit Route 114 in Minneapolis, MN. The route originates at the University of Minnesota campus in Minneapolis, then it travels several miles on Interstates 35W and 94, before it begins to operate as local service through the Uptown area of Minneapolis.

Another form of limited stop bus service includes local routes that may operate certain trips with limited or non-stop sections. For example, to aid commute times for downtown workers, Metro Transit Route 12 in Minneapolis operates during peak hours as non-stop for approximately eight blocks between Franklin Avenue and Uptown Transit Station, but the route serves all stops along that section at other times.

== See also ==
- Bus rapid transit
- Express bus service
- Express train
- Limited express
- Skip-stop
