= Van Siclen Avenue station (BMT Jamaica Line) =

New York City Subway station in Brooklyn

Van Siclen Avenue
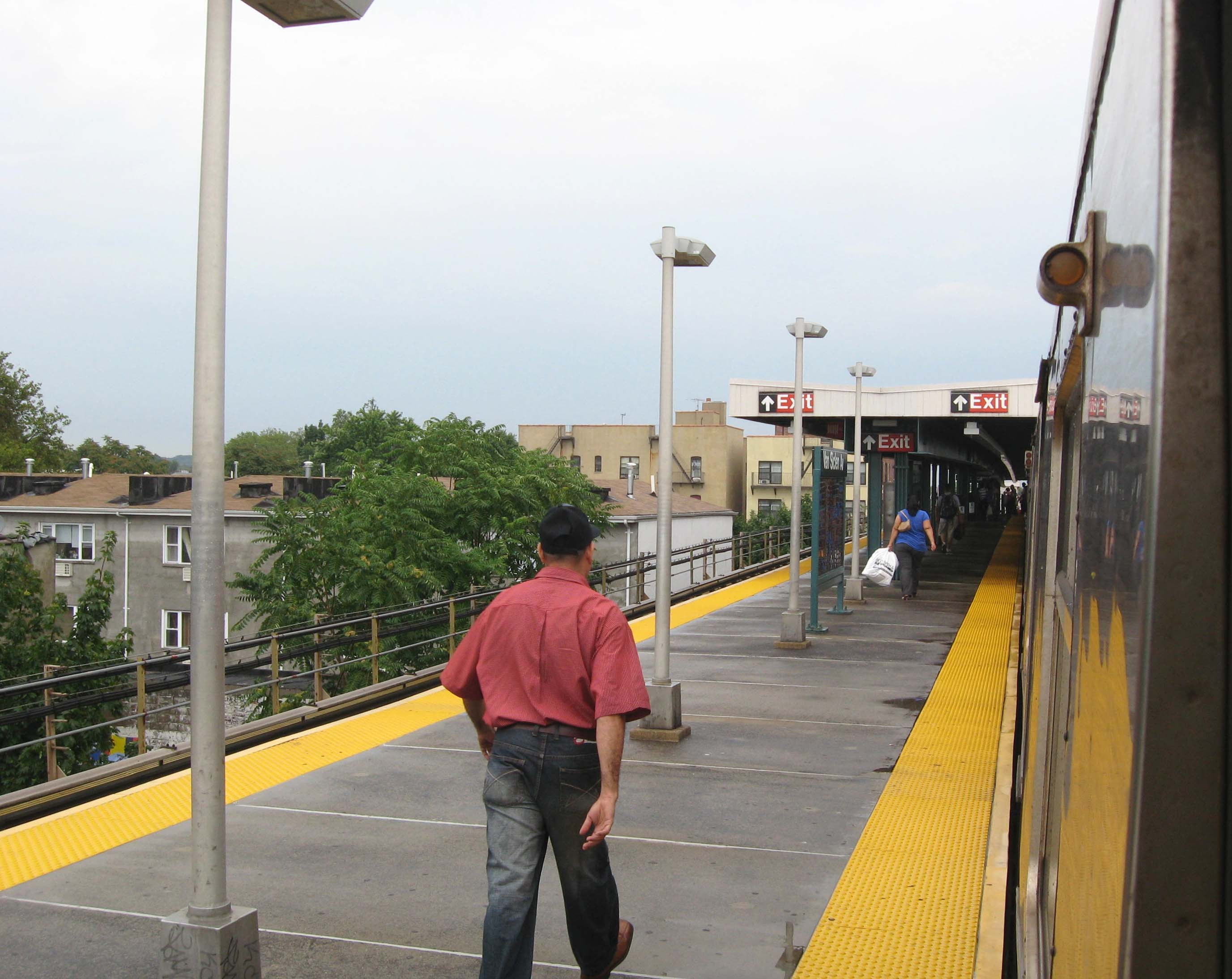
- Passengers at the west end of the platform

Station statistics
- Address: Van Siclen Avenue & Fulton Street; Brooklyn, NY
- Borough: Brooklyn
- Locale: Cypress Hills
- Coordinates: 40.678002°N 73.891726°W
- Division: B (BMT)
- Line: BMT Jamaica Line; BMT Lexington Avenue Line (formerly)
- Services: J (all except rush hours, peak direction); Z (rush hours, peak direction)
- Transit: NYCT Bus: Q24
- Structure: Elevated
- Platforms: 1 island platform
- Tracks: 2

Other information
- Opened: December 3, 1885; 140 years ago
- Accessible: No; planned

Traffic
- 2025: 677,108 ▲28.7%
- Rank: 356 out of 423
Services
Preceding station	New York City Subway	Following station
Alabama Avenue J Z toward Broad Street	J/Z (New York City Subway service)	Norwood Avenue Z skip-stop
Alabama Avenue J Z toward Broad Street	J/Z (New York City Subway service)	Cleveland Street J toward Jamaica Center–York College
Location
Location within New York City Subway
Location within New York City
Location within New York
Track layout
Street map
Station service legend
Symbol	Description
Stops all times except rush hours in the peak direction	Stops all times except rush hours in the peak direction
Stops rush hours in the peak direction only	Stops rush hours in the peak direction only

The Van Siclen Avenue station is an elevated skip-stop station on the BMT Jamaica Line of the New York City Subway. Located at the intersection of Fulton Street and Van Siclen Avenue in Brooklyn, it is served by the J train at all times except rush hours in the peak direction, when the Z train takes over service.

== History ==
The station opened on December 3, 1885, as part of a one-station extension of the Lexington Avenue Line from Alabama Avenue. This station was the eastern terminus of the line until May 30, 1893, when it was extended to Cypress Hills.

This station was closed from March 25 to August 6, 2006, for renovations. As part of the rehabilitation project, the stairs were rehabilitated, the floors were renewed, major structural repairs were made, new canopies were installed, the area around the station booth was reconfigured, the platform edge strips were replaced, walls were replaced, and a high-quality public address system was installed. The rehabilitation project cost $8.52 million. As part of its 2025–2029 Capital Program, the MTA has proposed making the station wheelchair-accessible in compliance with the Americans with Disabilities Act of 1990.

== Station layout ==
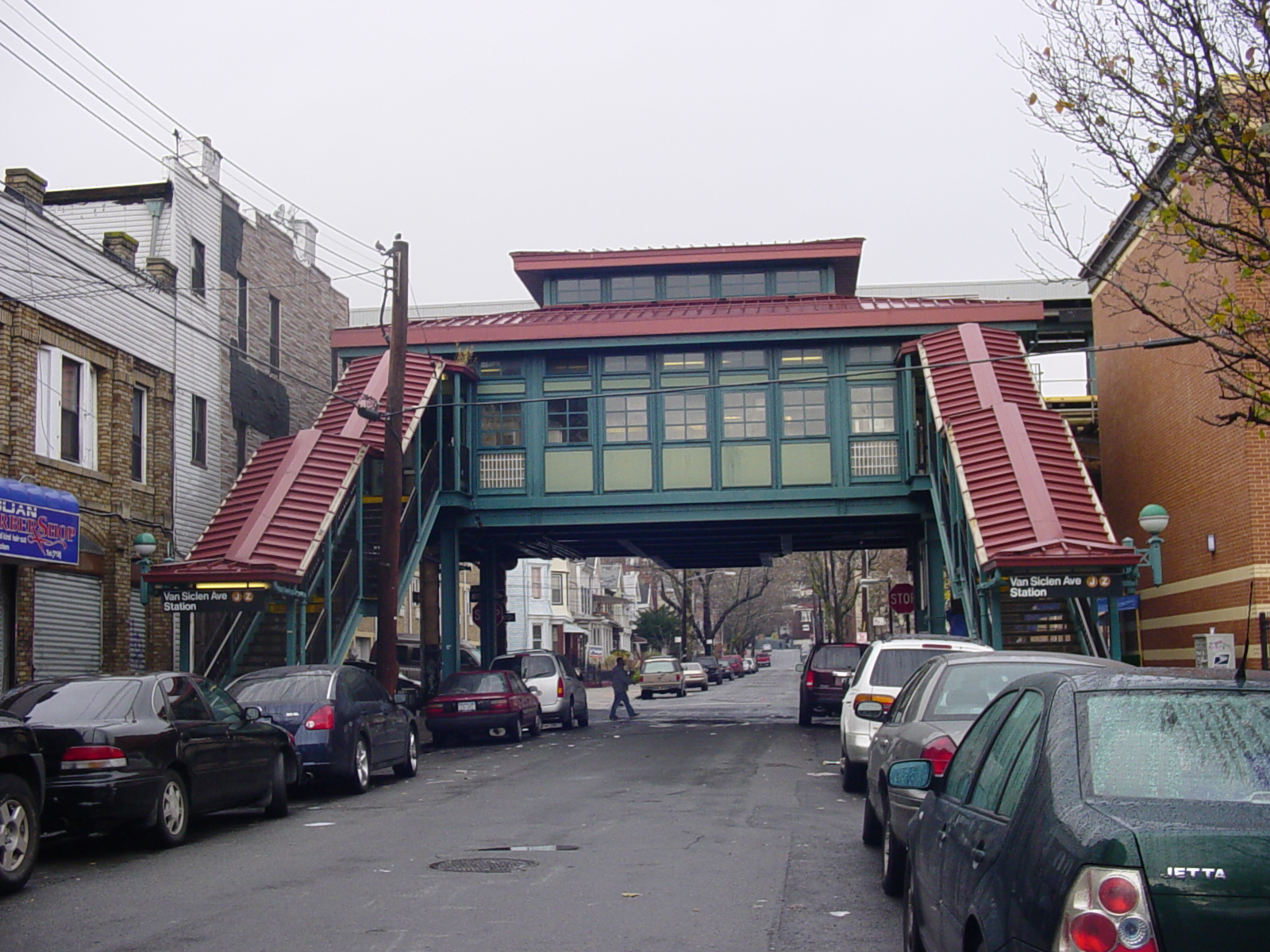
From the street, facing north

This elevated station has two tracks and one island platform. The canopy is short and has a squared off, flat roofline.

The artwork at the station, THE VIEW FROM HERE by Barbara Ellmann, was installed in 2007. It was intended to be evocative of structures in the surrounding area.

=== Exit ===
The station's only entrance and exit is a center mezzanine under the tracks with wooden floors and walls. This mezzanine is to the geographic south of the northbound track. Outside of fare control, two stairs descend to the southwest and southeast corners of Fulton Street and Van Siclen Avenue.
