= BMT Nassau Street Line =

New York City Subway line

- The J and Z trains, which use the Nassau Street Line through downtown, are colored brown. One station is also served by the M train, which is now part of the IND Sixth Avenue Line.

Overview
- Owner: City of New York
- Locale: Lower Manhattan, New York City
- Termini: Essex Street; Broad Street
- Stations: 6

Service
- Type: Rapid transit
- System: New York City Subway
- Operator: New York City Transit Authority
- Rolling stock: R160 R179 R143
- Daily ridership: 112,631

History
- Opened: September 16, 1908; 118 years ago
- Last extension: 1931

Technical
- Num of tracks: 2–4
- Character: Underground
- Track gauge: 4 ft 8 1/2 in (1,435 mm) standard gauge
- Electrification: Third rail, 625 V DC

The BMT Nassau Street Line is a rapid transit line of the B Division of the New York City Subway system in Manhattan. At its northern end, the line is a westward continuation of the BMT Jamaica Line in Brooklyn after the Jamaica Line crosses the Williamsburg Bridge into Manhattan. The Nassau Street Line continues south to a junction with the BMT Broadway Line just before the Montague Street Tunnel, after which the line reenters Brooklyn. Although the tracks merge into the Broadway Line south of Broad Street, there has been no regular service south of the Broad Street station since June 25, 2010. While the line is officially recognized as the Nassau Street Line, it only serves one station on Nassau Street: Fulton Street.

The line is served at all times by the J train. The Z provides supplemental rush hour service, operating in the peak direction. The M service has historically served the Nassau Street Line, but since 2010, the M has been rerouted via the Chrystie Street Connection to run on the IND Sixth Avenue Line, as a replacement for the V, which was discontinued due to financial shortfalls. The M continues to serve one Nassau Street Line station: the Essex Street station.

== Service ==
The following services use part or all of the BMT Nassau Street Line. The trunk line's bullets are colored brown:

	Time period			Section of line
	Rush hours	Middays, evenings, weekends	Late nights	Section of line
"J" train	local			north of Broad Street
"Z" train	local in peak direction	no service		north of Broad Street
"M" train	Essex Street only		no service	Essex Street

== History ==
=== Planning, construction, and first section ===
After the original lines of the Interborough Rapid Transit Company (IRT) opened, the city began planning new lines. Two of these were extensions of that system, to Downtown Brooklyn and Van Cortlandt Park, but the other two – the Centre Street Loop subway (or Brooklyn Loop subway) and Fourth Avenue subway (in Brooklyn) – were separate lines for which construction had not progressed as far. The Centre Street Loop, approved on January 25, 1907 as a four-track line (earlier proposed as two tracks), was to connect the Brooklyn Bridge, Manhattan Bridge, and Williamsburg Bridge via Centre Street, Canal Street, and Delancey Street. An extension south from the Brooklyn Bridge under William Street to Wall Street was also part of the plan, as were several loops towards the Hudson River and a loop connecting the bridges through Brooklyn. Trains coming from Brooklyn via the Manhattan and Williamsburg Bridges would be able to head back to that borough via the Brooklyn Bridge as well as the Montague Street Tunnel at the south end of the Centre Street Loop, and vice versa. All trains would pass through a large central station with four tracks and five platforms at Chambers Street, just north of the Brooklyn Bridge.

Construction contracts for the main line in Manhattan were awarded in early 1907, though the city had not yet selected an operator for the line. The work was divided into five sections: two under Centre Street and three under other streets or buildings. The city began receiving bids for the sections under Centre Street in March 1907. The city received bids for the sections between Centre Street and Bowery (under Kenmare Street), between Bowery and Norfolk Street (under Delancey Street), and between Pearl Street and Park Row (under the Manhattan Municipal Building) that June. The line was assigned to a proposed Tri-borough system in early 1908 and to the Brooklyn Rapid Transit Company (BRT) in the Dual Contracts, adopted on March 4, 1913. Unlike previous subway contracts that the city government had issued, the BRT was responsible only for constructing the Centre Street Loop and installing equipment, not for operating the loop. As a result, although the loop was almost completed by late 1908, there was no operator for the route at the time. Furthermore, the BRT did not originally want to operate the loop.

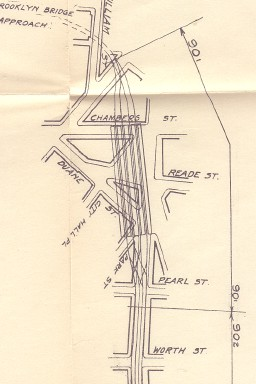
1908 plan for Chambers Street and the Brooklyn Bridge connection

The BRT began operating through a short piece of subway, coming off the Williamsburg Bridge under Delancey Street to Essex Street, on September 16, 1908. The BRT tunnel under Centre Street was completed by 1910, except for the section under the Municipal Building, which contained the incomplete Chambers Street station. The tunnel remained unused for several years. In March 1913, the Public Service Commission authorized the BRT to lay tracks, install signals, and operate the loop. The Centre Street Loop was opened to Chambers Street on August 4, 1913, with temporary operation at first on the two west tracks. The south tracks on the Manhattan Bridge, also running into Chambers Street, were placed in service on June 22, 1915.

=== Second section ===
==== Construction ====
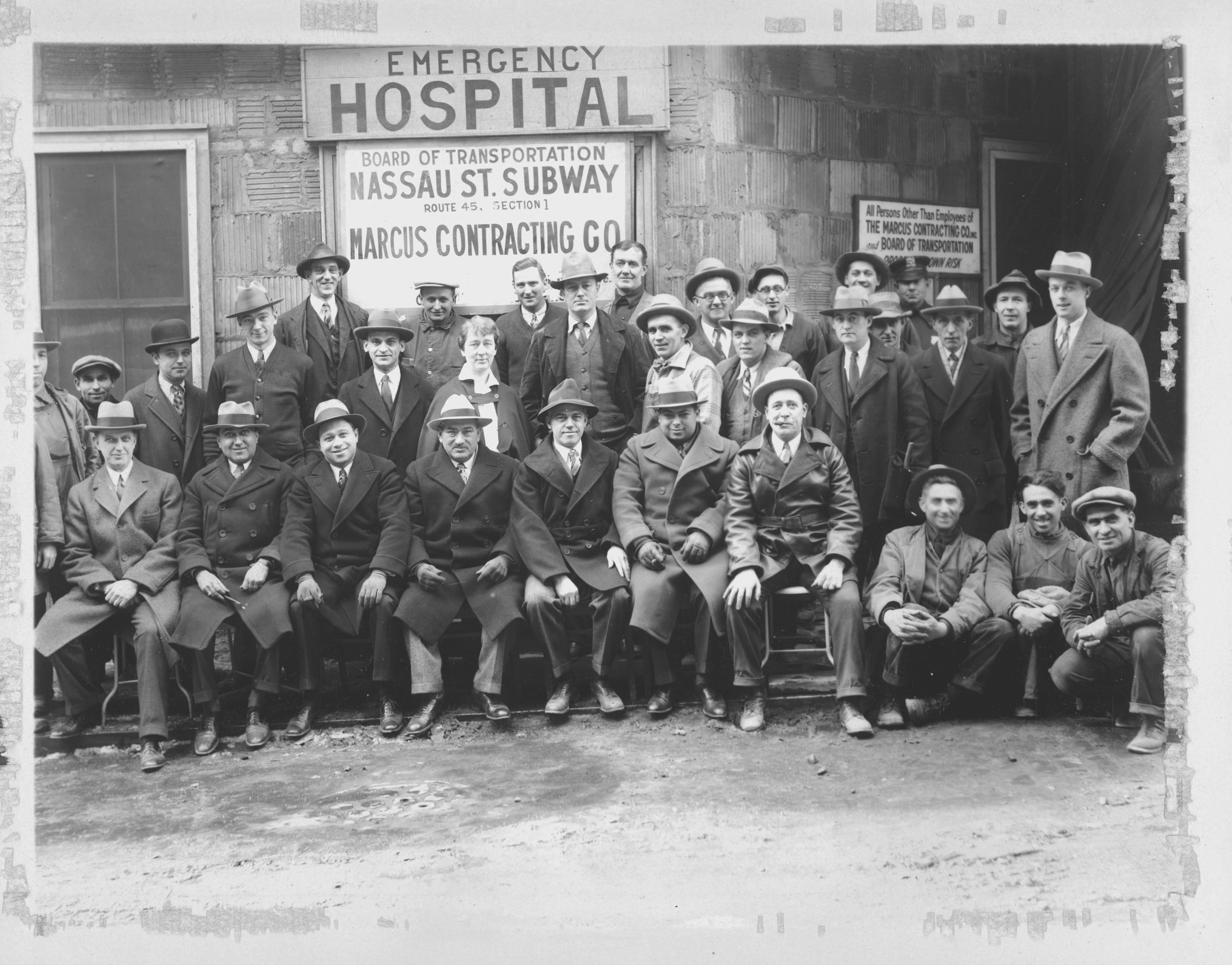
Group photo of the Marcus Contracting Co. taken during construction of the Nassau Street subway, circa 1928

Under Contract 4 of the Dual Contracts, the BRT (later reorganized as the Brooklyn–Manhattan Transit Corporation or BMT) was to operate the Nassau Street Line. The southern portion of the line remained incomplete for several years, and the BRT brought a $30 million suit against the city for not building the line before January 1, 1917. Most of the BMT's Dual Contracts lines were completed by 1924, except for the Nassau Street Line. BMT chairman Gerhard Dahl was persistent at requesting that the city build the line, saying in 1923 that the BMT was willing to operate the line as soon as the city completed it. At the time, the BMT was planning to construct two stations on the Nassau Street Line: one at Fulton Street, where the BMT planned to place the northbound platform above the southbound platform due to the street's narrowness, and the other at the intersection at Broad and Wall Streets, where both platforms would be on the same level. However, mayor John Hylan refused to act during his final two years in office. BOT chairman John H. Delaney believed that the line was unnecessary because both of its planned stations would be extremely close to existing subway stations. Meanwhile, the BMT claimed that the city's failure to complete the line was overburdening other BMT lines. By January 1925, the BMT was asking its passengers to pressure Hylan into approving the remainder of the Nassau Street Line. Work did not commence until after James Walker succeeded Hylan as mayor at the end of 1925.

The city government agreed to build the Nassau Street Line in May 1927, after the BMT sued the city for $30 million. At the time, the city wanted to take over the BMT's lines but could not do so until all Dual Contracts lines were completed. The BOT received bids for the construction of the line that July, but it rejected every bid the next month because of concerns over the lowest bidder's ability to complete the work. That September, contractors again submitted bids to the BOT; some bidders offered to build the entire line, while others only offered to construct the segments of the line to the north or south of Liberty Street. The BOT awarded construction contracts for the line's construction two months later. The Marcus Contracting Company was hired to build the portion north of Liberty Street, including the Fulton Street station, for $4.7 million, while Moranti and Raymond were hired to build the portion to the south for $5.7 million. The New York City Board of Estimate approved the contracts in January 1928, allowing the builders to construct the line using the cut-and-cover method, despite merchants' requests that the line be constructed using tunnelling shields.

The line was constructed 20 feet (6.1 m) below the active IRT Lexington Avenue Line, next to buildings along the narrow Nassau Street, and the project encountered difficulties such as quicksand. When the construction contracts were awarded, work had been projected to be completed in 39 months. By early 1929, sixty percent of the work had been finished. Nassau Street is only 34 feet (10 m) wide, and the subway floor was only 20 feet (6.1 m) below building foundations. As a result, 89 buildings had to be underpinned to ensure that they would stay on their foundations. Construction had to be done 20 feet below the active IRT Lexington Avenue Line. An area filled with quicksand with water, which used to belong to a spring, was found between John Street and Broad Street. Construction was done at night so as to not disturb workers in the Financial District. The project was 80 percent complete by April 1930, and Charles Meads & Co. was awarded a $252,000 contract to install the Fulton Street station's finishes the next month. The plans for that station had been changed so that the southbound platform was above the northbound platform. The total construction cost was $10.072 million for 0.9 miles (1.4 km) of new tunnels, or $2,068 per foot ($6,780/m), which was three times the normal cost of construction at the time.

==== Opening of loop ====
The Nassau Street Loop opened at 3 p.m. on May 29, 1931, when Mayor Jimmy Walker took the controls of a train of D-type Triplex cars from Chambers Street to Broad Street. This completed what was known as the Nassau Street Loop. The loop ran from the line's previous terminus at Chambers Street, running through the Fulton Street and Broad Street stations before merging with the Montague Street Tunnel to Brooklyn. The completion of the line relieved congestion on several BMT lines to southern Brooklyn, which previously had to operate to Midtown Manhattan using the Broadway Line. When the line was completed, Culver Line trains began operating on the loop; previously, elevated Culver Line trains from Coney Island ran only as far as Ninth Avenue, where transfers were made to West End subway trains. The new line provided an additional ten percent capacity compared with existing service through DeKalb Avenue. Service on the Jamaica Line was extended to operate to this station. The station at Wall Street was named "Broad Street" to distinguish it from the already-open Wall Street stations on the Lexington Avenue Line and Seventh Avenue Line.

Plans for the Chambers Street area changed several times during construction, always including a never-completed connection to the Brooklyn Bridge tracks. By 1910, only the west two tracks were to rise onto the bridge, and the east two were to continue south to the Montague Street Tunnel. As actually built for the 1931 opening south of Chambers Street, the two outer tracks ran south to the tunnel, while the two inner tracks continued several blocks in a lower level stub tunnel to allow trains to reverse direction.

=== Service changes and modifications ===
A major change to the Nassau Street Line occurred on November 27, 1967, when the extensive Chrystie Street reroutes resulted in the discontinuation of service over the south tracks of the Manhattan Bridge into Chambers Street, as those tracks were now directly connected to the upper level (Broadway) Canal Street station. This ended all "loop" service, which had most recently seen rush hour "specials" on both the Brighton and 4th Avenue lines operating via both the Manhattan Bridge and Montague Street tunnel in single directions.

As part of the Metropolitan Transportation Authority's 2000–2004 Capital Program, the reconfiguration of the Nassau Street Line between Canal Street and Essex Street took place. As part of the plan, Jamaica-bound trains were rerouted along the southbound inner track, and the former northbound platforms at Canal Street and Bowery were closed. The northbound inner track was removed; the northbound outer track was retained for non-revenue moves. Work on the project started in 2001. This change took effect on September 20, 2004. The reconfiguration provided additional operational flexibility by providing a third through track (previously the center two tracks stub-ended at Canal Street), which was equipped with reverse signaling. The consolidation of the Bowery and Canal Street stations was intended to enhance customer security while consolidating passengers onto what used to be the southbound platforms. The project was completed in May 2005, seven months behind its scheduled completion. The project cost $36 million.

Weekend service terminated at Canal Street between September 30, 1990, and January 1994. Weekend service terminated at Chambers Street until June 2015; during that time, Broad Street and the J/Z platforms at Fulton Street were two of the few New York City Subway stations that lacked full-time service. On June 14, 2015, weekend J service was extended back to Broad Street; this was proposed in July 2014 to improve weekend service between Lower Manhattan and Brooklyn.

In 2024, as part of a program to upgrade the signaling of the New York City Subway, the MTA proposed installing communications-based train control (CBTC) on the Nassau Street Line as part of its 2025–2029 Capital Program.

== Station listing ==
Station service legend
Stops all times	Stops 24 hours a day
Stops all times except late nights	Stops every day during daytime hours only
Stops late nights only	Stops every day during overnight hours only
Stops weekdays during the day	Stops during weekday daytime hours only
Stops rush hours only	Stops during weekday rush hours only
Stops rush hours in the peak direction only	Stops during weekday rush hours in the peak direction only
Time period details
Disabled access	Station is compliant with the Americans with Disabilities Act
↑	Station is compliant with the Americans with Disabilities Act in the indicated direction only
↓	Station is compliant with the Americans with Disabilities Act in the indicated direction only
	Elevator access to mezzanine only

Neighborhood (approximate)	Disabled access	Station	Services	Opened	Transfers and notes
Begins as the BMT Jamaica Line from the Williamsburg Bridge (J M Z)
Lower East Side		Essex Street	J M Z	September 16, 1908	IND Sixth Avenue Line (F <F>) at Delancey Street
Lower East Side	Split to Chrystie Street Connection (M )				
Lower East Side		Bowery	J Z	August 4, 1913	
Chinatown	Elevator access to mezzanine only	Canal Street	J Z	August 4, 1913	BMT Broadway Line (N Q R W ) IRT Lexington Avenue Line (4 6 <6> )
Former Connection to Manhattan Bridge south tracks
Civic Center	Disabled access	Chambers Street	J Z	August 4, 1913	IRT Lexington Avenue Line (4 5 6 <6> ) at Brooklyn Bridge–City Hall
Financial District	Disabled access	Fulton Street	J Z	May 29, 1931	IRT Broadway–Seventh Avenue Line (2 3 ) IRT Lexington Avenue Line (4 5 ) IND Eighth Avenue Line (A C ) Connection to BMT Broadway Line (N R W ) at Cortlandt Street via Dey Street Passageway; Connection to PATH at World Trade Center
Financial District		Broad Street	J Z	May 29, 1931	
Financial District	Terminus of all service				
Line merges with the BMT Broadway Line (N R ) and becomes the BMT Fourth Avenue Line via the Montague Street Tunnel
