= Bowery station =

New York City Subway station in Manhattan

Bowery
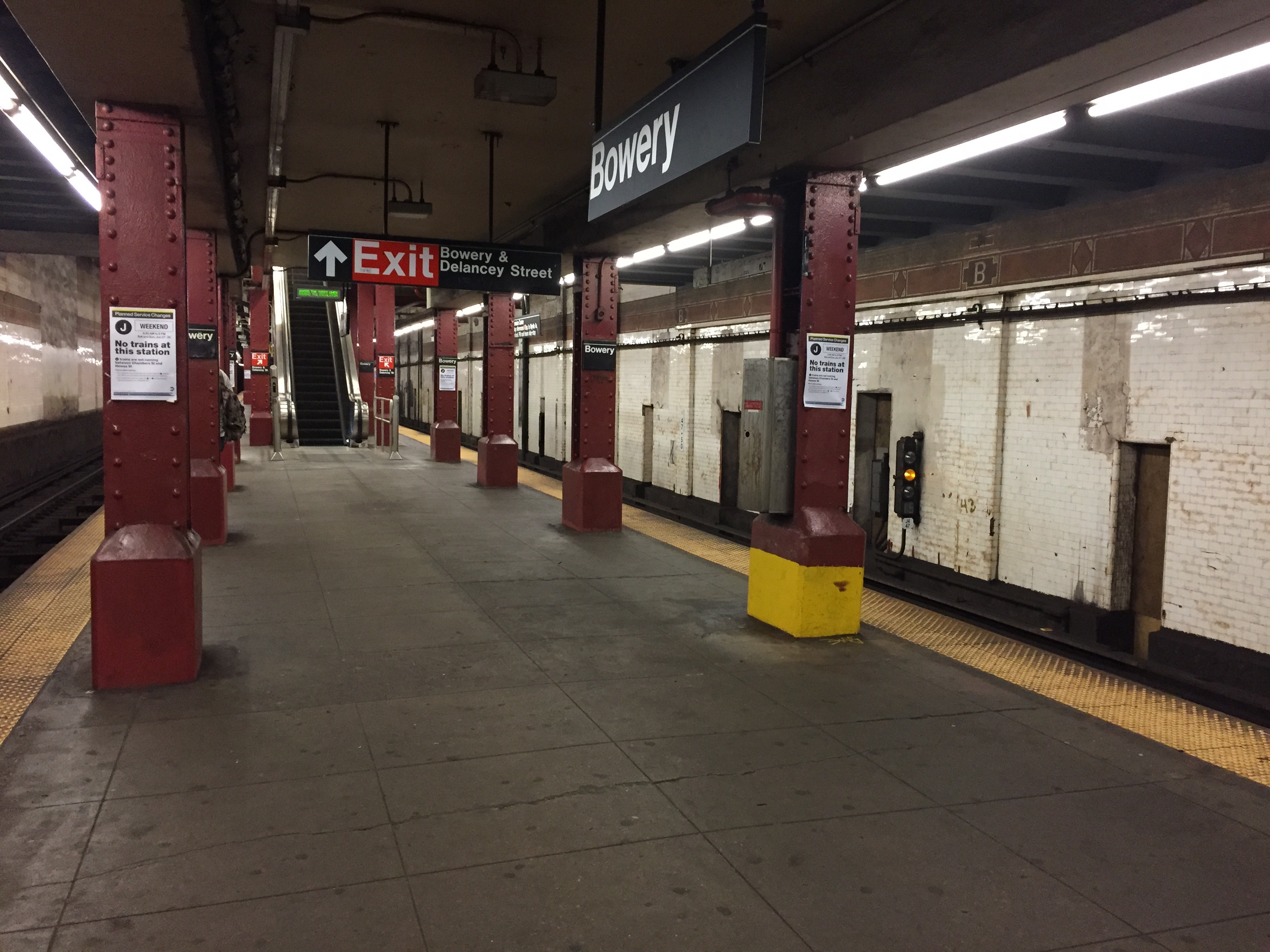

Station statistics
- Address: Bowery & Delancey Street; New York, New York
- Borough: Manhattan
- Locale: Lower East Side, Little Italy
- Coordinates: 40.720299°N 73.994079°W
- Division: B (BMT)
- Line: BMT Nassau Street Line
- Services: J (all times); Z (rush hours, peak direction)
- Transit: NYCT Bus: M103
- Structure: Underground
- Platforms: 2 island platforms (1 in regular service)
- Tracks: 3 (2 in regular service; 1 not in regular service; 1 removed)

Other information
- Opened: August 4, 1913; 113 years ago

Traffic
- 2025: 1,005,874 ▲14.3%
- Rank: 310 out of 423
Services
Preceding station	New York City Subway	Following station
Canal Street J Z toward Broad Street	J/Z (New York City Subway service)	Essex Street J Z toward Jamaica Center–York College
Location
Location within New York City Subway
Location within New York City
Location within New York
Track layout
Street map
Station service legend
Symbol	Description
Stops all times	Stops all times
Stops rush hours in the peak direction only	Stops rush hours in the peak direction only
Stops weekday evenings only	Stops weekday evenings only

The Bowery station is a station on the BMT Nassau Street Line of the New York City Subway. Located at the intersection of Bowery and Delancey Street on the Lower East Side of Manhattan, it is served by the J train at all times and the Z train during rush hours in the peak direction.

== History ==
Construction contracts for the Nassau Street main line in Manhattan were awarded in early 1907, despite no determination of the operator once completed. The line was assigned to a proposed Tri-borough system in early 1908 and to the Brooklyn Rapid Transit Company (BRT) in the Dual Contracts, adopted on March 4, 1913. Construction of this underground station began in August 1907 and was almost completed by the end of 1910. However, the BMT Nassau Street Line to the south did not open until August 4, 1913, when Chambers Street was ready for service, and the Centre Street Loop was opened.

The station's platforms originally could only fit six 67-foot-long (20 m) cars. In April 1926, the New York City Board of Transportation (BOT) received bids for the lengthening of platforms at three stations on the Centre Street Loop, including the Bowery station, to accommodate eight-car trains. The New York City Board of Estimate approved funds for the project in July 1926, and the extensions were completed in 1927, bringing the length of the platforms to 535 feet (163 m).

This station was originally configured like a typical express station with two island platforms and four tracks; express service ran on the inner tracks and local service on the outer tracks. When it was built, the station was an important connection point for elevated and streetcar lines. With those lines long gone, a four-track station was no longer considered necessary.

As part of its 2000–2004 Capital Program, the Metropolitan Transportation Authority reconfigured the Nassau Street Line between Canal Street and Essex Street. Northbound trains were rerouted via the second track from the west, and the former northbound platforms at Canal Street and Bowery were closed. The second track from the east was removed. Work on the project started in 2001. This change took effect on September 20, 2004. The reconfiguration provided additional operational flexibility by adding a third through track (previously, the two center tracks stub-ended at Canal Street), which was equipped with reverse signaling. The consolidation of the Bowery and Canal Street stations was intended to enhance customer security while consolidating passengers onto what used to be the southbound platforms. The project was completed in May 2005, seven months behind its scheduled completion. The project cost $36 million.

The closed platform has been used for fashion shows, a police terrorism drill, and for dozens of movie and television shoots yearly.

== Station layout ==
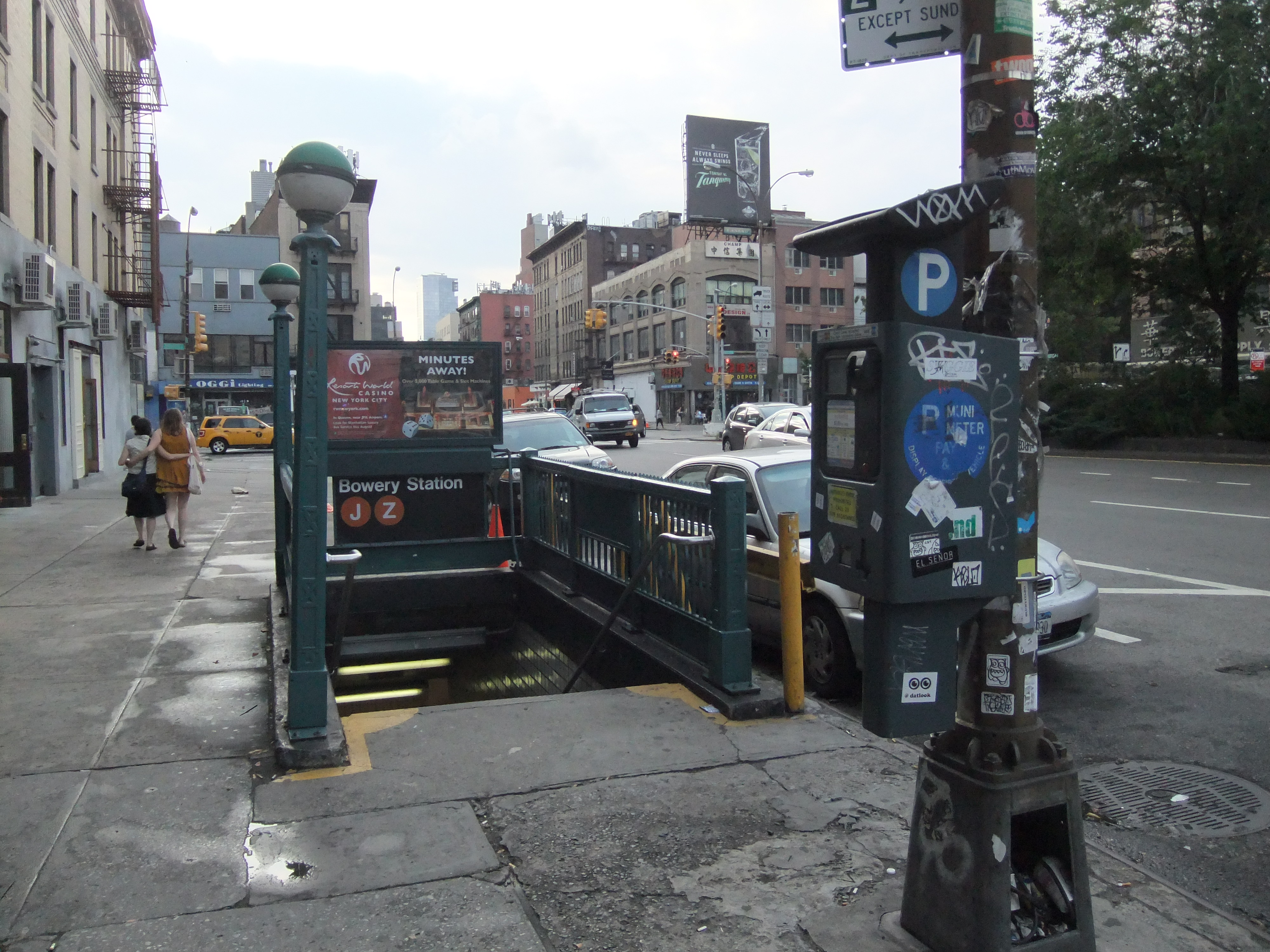
Entrance on Bowery and Delancey Street

The station has three tracks and two island platforms, but only the northern island platform is accessible to passengers. The fourth track, the former northbound express on the abandoned side, was removed in the 2004 renovations.

The J and Z trains serve the Bowery station; the former operates all times, and the latter operates during rush hours in the peak direction. The next stop to the west is Canal Street, while the next stop to the east is Essex Street. Fixed platform barriers, which are intended to prevent commuters falling to the tracks, are positioned near the platform edges.

Mosaics include the name tablet, "B," "newsstand," "Women," and "Men" in raised letters. A unique feature of the station is the arched wall niches at the north end, rather than the standard rectangular niches. The station featured a news-stand and restrooms, all of which have long been closed.

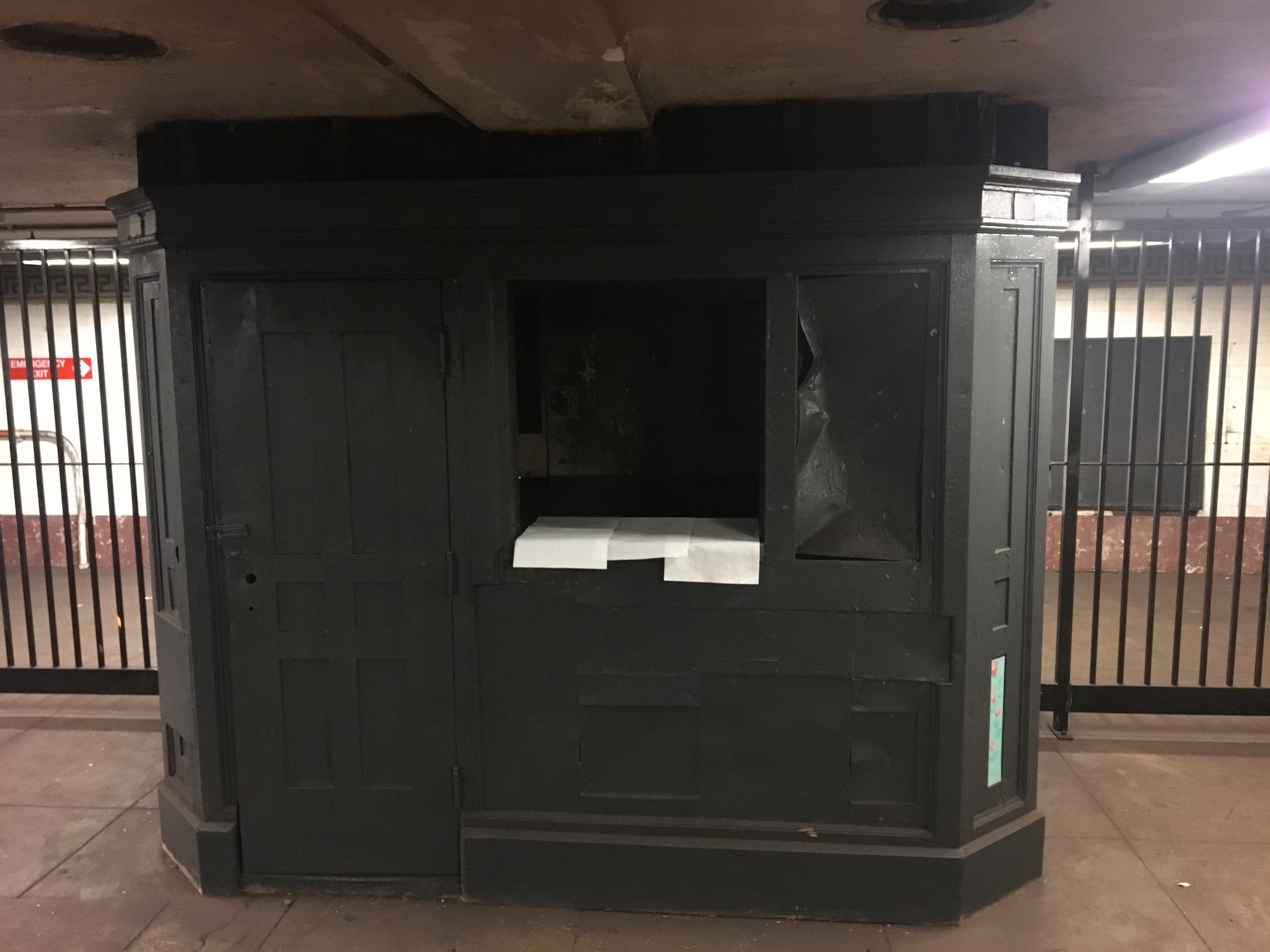
Decommissioned token booth

The station has two mezzanine areas on each side of Bowery. Only the eastern mezzanine is open today; the western mezzanine has long been closed, and stairways to it are blocked. The eastern mezzanine is reached via three flights of stairs or a single escalator from the open platform.

=== Provisions ===
The east end of the station has a high ceiling; this was to allow for a proposed subway line to pass through it. This section had an opening in the wall separating both platforms to bracket the new line, but has been covered with plywood. At the curve between Bowery and Canal Street, there is a small provision for a line into Spring Street, for which no definite plan was ever provided. Due to the depth, there were escalators that were provided in the original construction, one on each platform running to the east mezzanine. The escalator on the south platform was either not installed or removed long ago.

=== Exits ===
Two exits go from the east mezzanine to either eastern corner of Delancey Street and Bowery. These are the only open entrances to the station. The original exit from the east mezzanine led to the median of Delancey Street just east of Bowery; it has since been demolished and sealed.

In addition to the open exits, there are two exits from the closed west mezzanine that go to either western corner of Kenmare Street and Bowery from inside buildings. The exit to the northwestern corner was completely demolished, while the exit to the southwestern corner was partly repurposed; part of the southwestern exit remains under MTA property as an emergency exit. It is located immediately to the east of the 10 Kenmare Street storefront, behind a red door.
