= Crescent Street station (BMT Jamaica Line) =

New York City Subway station in Brooklyn

Crescent Street
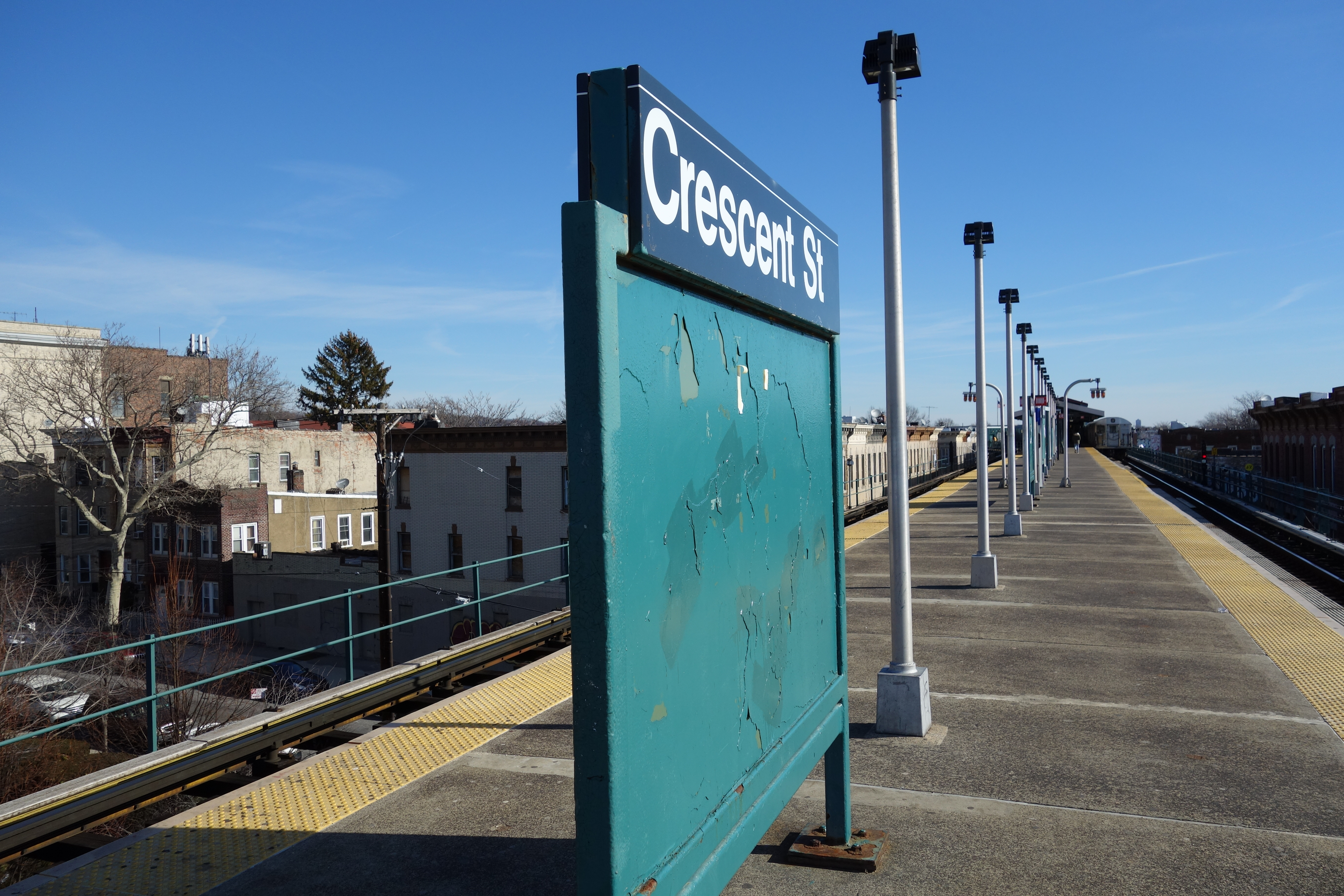
- Platform view, looking east

Station statistics
- Address: Crescent Street and Fulton Street; Brooklyn, New York
- Borough: Brooklyn
- Locale: Cypress Hills
- Coordinates: 40.683655°N 73.872414°W
- Division: B (BMT)
- Line: BMT Jamaica Line
- Services: J (all times); Z (rush hours, peak direction)
- Transit: NYCT Bus: B13, Q24
- Structure: Elevated
- Platforms: 1 island platform
- Tracks: 2

Other information
- Opened: May 30, 1893; 133 years ago

Traffic
- 2025: 960,044 ▲32.3%
- Rank: 319 out of 423
Services
Preceding station	New York City Subway	Following station
Norwood Avenue J Z toward Broad Street	J/Z (New York City Subway service)	75th Street–Elderts Lane Z skip-stop
Norwood Avenue J Z toward Broad Street	J/Z (New York City Subway service)	Cypress Hills J toward Jamaica Center–York College
Cleveland Street J skip-stop	J/Z (New York City Subway service)	Cypress Hills J toward Jamaica Center–York College
Location
Location within New York City Subway
Location within New York City
Location within New York
Track layout
Street map
Station service legend
Symbol	Description
Stops all times except rush hours in the peak direction	Stops all times except rush hours in the peak direction
Stops rush hours in the peak direction only	Stops rush hours in the peak direction only
Stops all times	Stops all times

The Crescent Street station is a station on the BMT Jamaica Line of the New York City Subway. Located at the intersection of Crescent and Fulton Streets in Cypress Hills, Brooklyn, it is served by the J train at all times and the Z during rush hours in the peak direction.

== History ==
This station was opened on May 30, 1893, as part of the Brooklyn Elevated Railroad's four stop extension of the Lexington Avenue Line to Cypress Hills.

Joint service with the Long Island Rail Road's Atlantic Branch existed between Norwood Avenue and Crescent Street stations with a connection built at Chestnut Street in Brooklyn. This allowed BRT trains to access the Rockaways and Manhattan Beach while affording the LIRR a connection into Manhattan to the BRT terminal located at Park Row over the Brooklyn Bridge (this service predated the opening of the East River Tunnels to Penn Station). This service ended in 1917 when the United States Railroad Administration took over the LIRR, and classified different operating standards between rapid transit trains and regular heavy rail railroads such as the LIRR. The ramp was taken down in 1942 for World War II scrap. A tower continued to stand west of the station to control trains using the incline until it was taken down sometime after 1970.

This station was renovated in 2007. As part of the station renovation project, the stairs were rehabilitated, the floors were renewed, major structural repairs were made, new canopies were installed, the area around the station booth was reconfigured, the platform edge strips were replaced, walls were replaced, and a high-quality public address system was installed. The renovation cost $8.43 million. In 2023, a short barrier was installed at the center of the platforms to reduce the probability of passengers being pushed into the tracks.

== Station layout ==
This elevated station has two tracks and one narrow island platform. An arched canopy covers the eastern half (railroad north) of the platform.

An artwork called Wheel of Bloom – Soak Up the Sun by Jung Hyang Kim was installed in this station during a 2007 renovation. It consists of stained glass panels on the platform's sign structures showing subway train wheels lit by sunlight.

A sharp S Curve moves the line from Fulton Street to Jamaica Avenue immediately north of the station. The first turn, from Fulton Street onto Crescent Street, ranks as the sharpest curve in the B Division, and second sharpest in the entire New York City Subway, second only to City Hall on the IRT Lexington Avenue Line. From the late-1950s into the 1960s the New York City Transit Authority had a proposal to realign the BMT Jamaica Line from this station (actually from Grant or Nichols Avenues) northeast to 80th Street and Jamaica Avenue, west of the 85th Street station. This would have also included an express track. The realignment was never carried out.

=== Exits ===
The station's small, single station house is on the extreme eastern end of the platform. It has a turnstile bank, token booth, and a single staircase going to an overpass below the tracks that splits into two staircases going down to either side of Fulton Street between Crescent and Pine Streets.

== Gallery ==
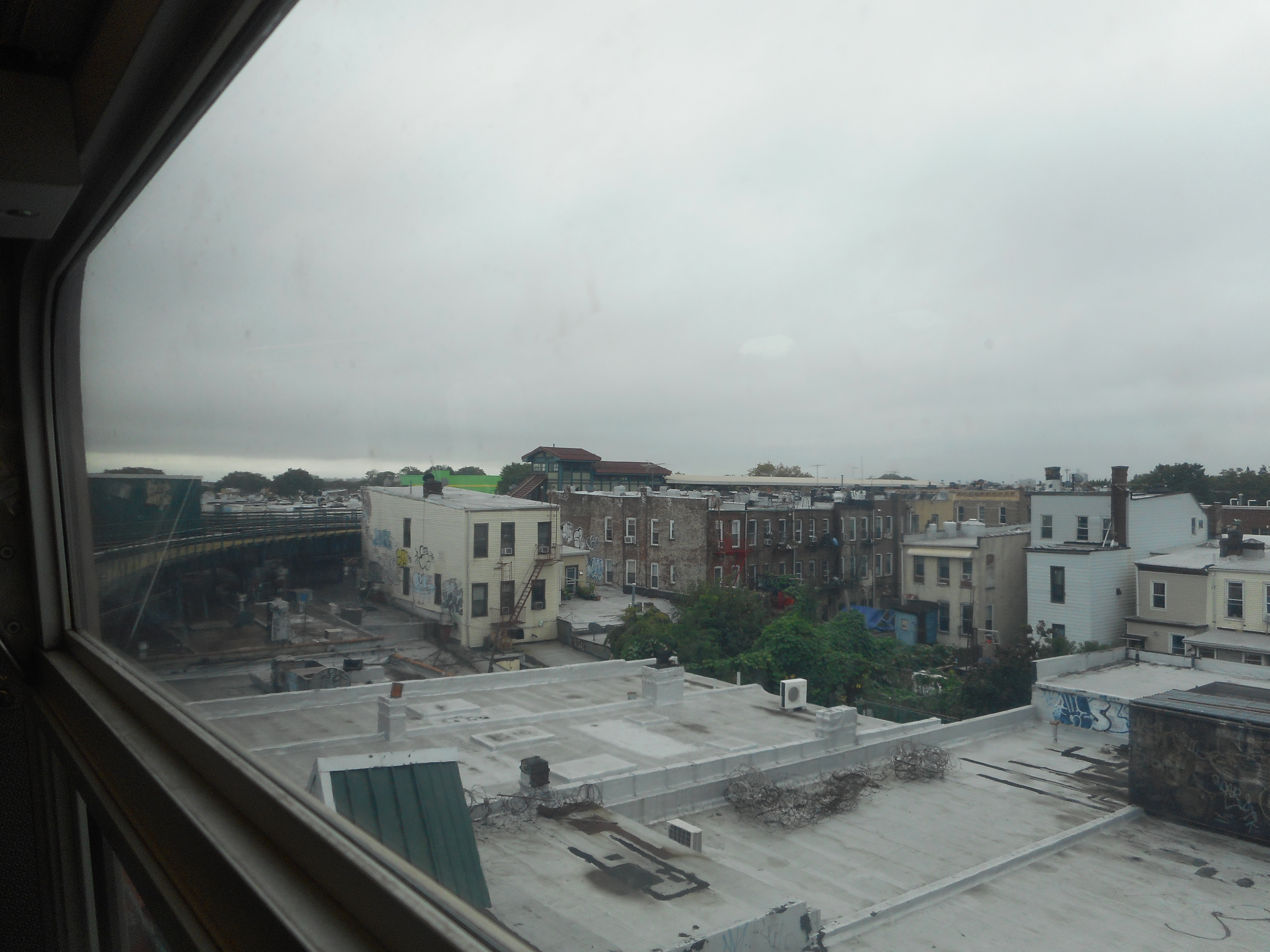
The station as seen from the "S-curve"

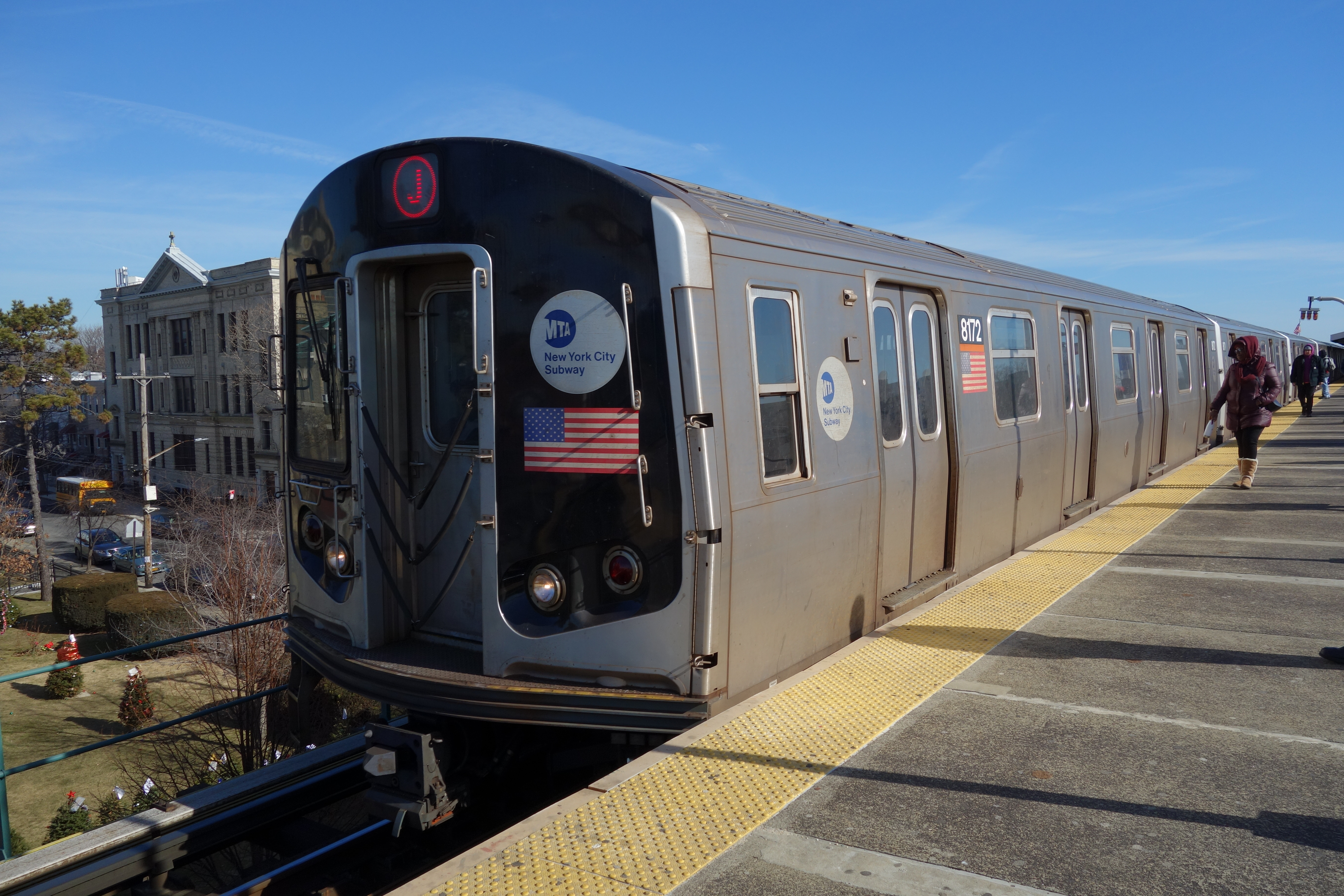
Southbound J train arriving

The Crescent Street platform at sunset, fall 2026
