= J/Z (New York City Subway service) =

Rapid transit services

- Nassau Street Local; Nassau Street Express

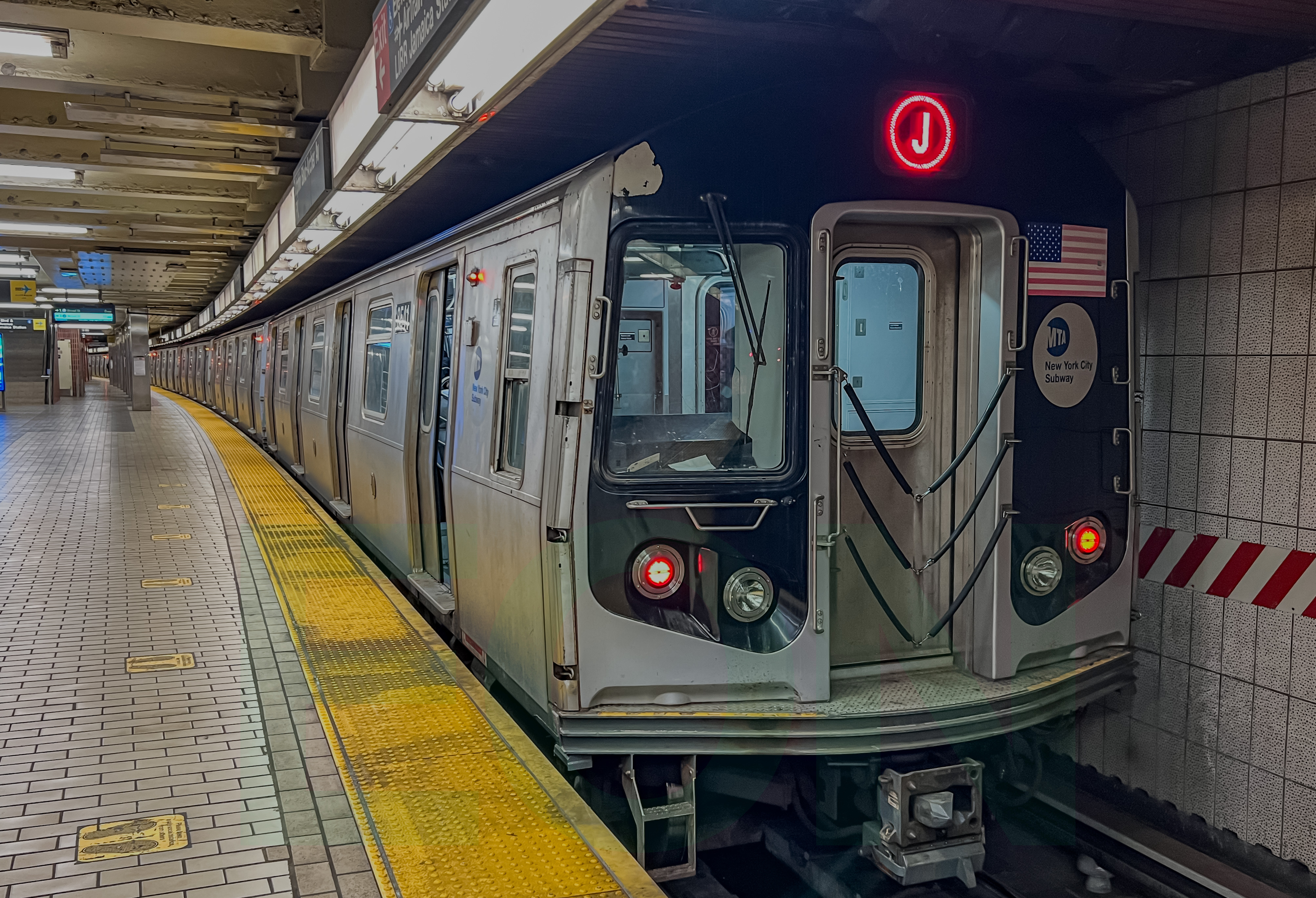
- A Manhattan-bound J train of R160As at Sutphin Boulevard-Archer Avenue-JFK

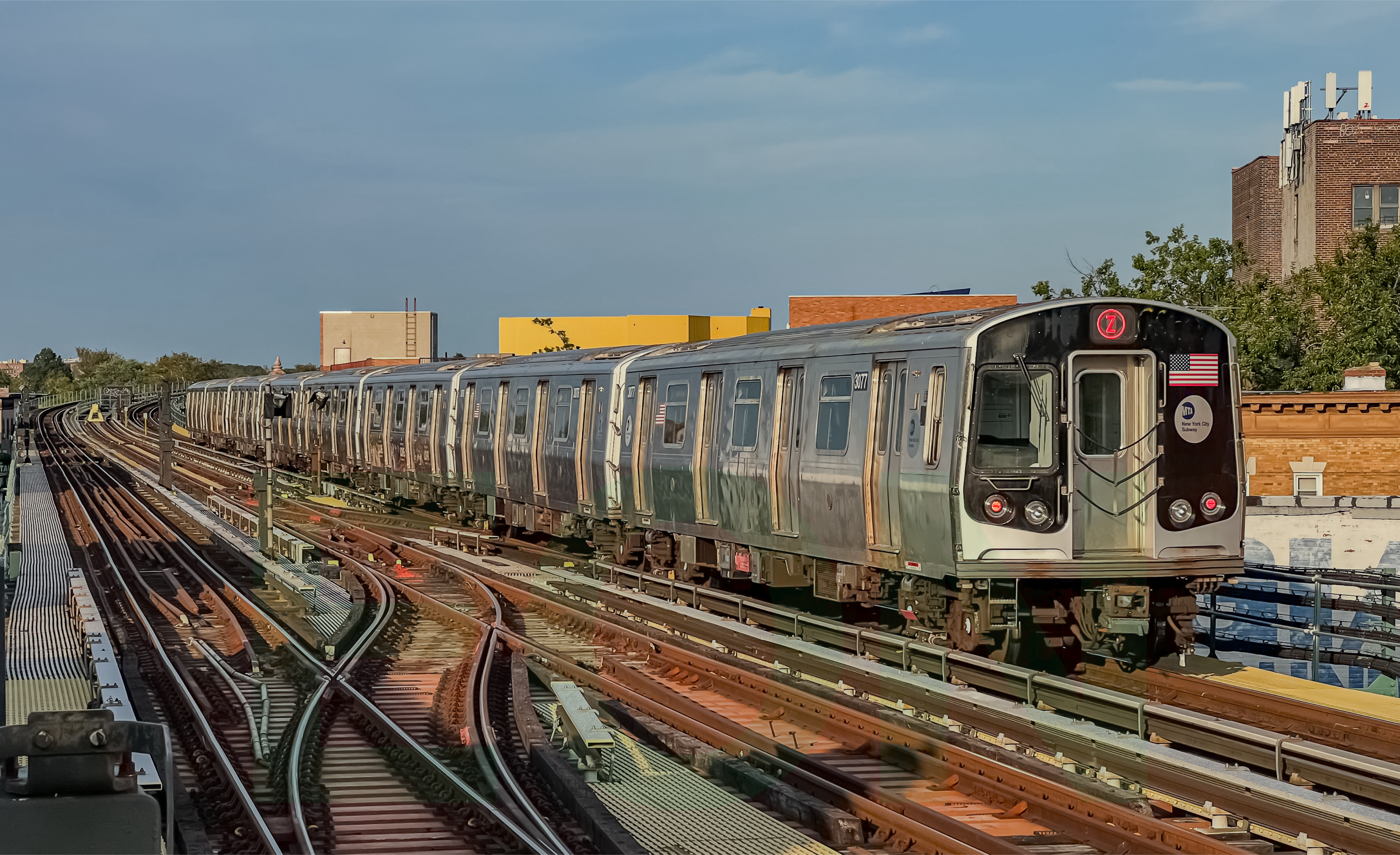
- A Jamaica Center-bound Z train of R179s leaving 111th Street

- Western end: Broad Street
- Eastern end: Jamaica Center–York College
- Stations: 30 (J service); 21 (Z service); 20 (J skip-stop service)
- Rolling stock: R160; R179 (Rolling stock assignments subject to change)
- Depot: East New York Yard
- Started service: 1893; 133 years ago (predecessor); November 1967; 59 years ago (present-day J service); December 11, 1988; 37 years ago (present-day Z service)

The J Nassau Street Local and Z Nassau Street Express are two rapid transit services in the B Division of the New York City Subway. Their route emblems, or "bullets", are colored brown. The services use the BMT Nassau Street Line in Lower Manhattan.

The J operates 24 hours daily, while the Z is a variant to the J and operates only in the peak direction during rush hours; both services operate between Jamaica Center–York College in Jamaica, Queens, and Broad Street in Lower Manhattan. When the Z operates, the two services form a skip-stop pair between Sutphin Boulevard–JFK and Myrtle Avenue/Broadway and also make express stops between Myrtle and Marcy Avenues in Brooklyn. Midday J service also makes express stops between Myrtle and Marcy Avenues and all stops along the full route other times.

The J/Z's current skip-stop pattern was implemented in 1988. The J/Z is derived from four routes:

- The JJ/15 between Broad or Chambers Streets in Lower Manhattan and 168th Street in Queens
- The KK between 57th Street/Sixth Avenue in Midtown Manhattan and 168th Street in Queens
- The QJ between Brighton Beach (Coney Island August 1968–January 1973) in Brooklyn and 168th Street in Queens
- The 14 between Broad or Chambers Streets in Lower Manhattan and Canarsie–Rockaway Parkway in Brooklyn

== History ==
=== Before the Chrystie Street Connection ===
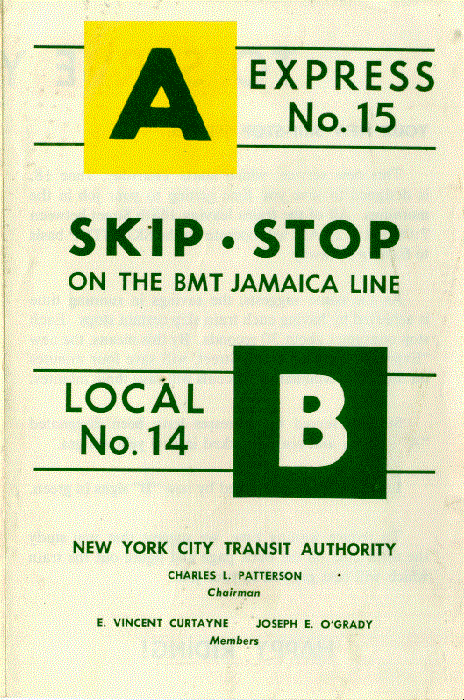
A brochure describing the introduction of A/B skip-stop service on the No. 14 and No. 15 services of the BMT Jamaica Line on June 18, 1959

The Jamaica Line – then known as the Broadway Elevated – was one of the original elevated lines in Brooklyn, completed in 1893 from Cypress Hills west to Broadway Ferry in Williamsburg. It was then a two-track line, with a single local service between the two ends, and a second east of Gates Avenue, where the Lexington Avenue Elevated merged. This second service later became the 12, and was eliminated on October 13, 1950, with the abandonment of the Lexington Avenue Elevated.

The second major service on the Broadway Elevated ran between Canarsie and Williamsburg via the BMT Canarsie Line, started on July 30, 1906, when the Broadway and Canarsie tracks were connected at East New York. As part of the Dual Contracts, an extension from Cypress Hills east to Jamaica was completed on July 3, 1918, a third track was added west of East New York, and express trains began running on it in 1922.

The Brooklyn–Manhattan Transit Corporation numbered its services in 1924, and the Canarsie and Jamaica services became 14 and 15. Both ran express during rush hours in the peak direction west of East New York. Express trains would only stop at Myrtle Avenue, Essex Street and Canal Street, before making local stops afterwards. Additional 14 trains, between Eastern Parkway or Atlantic Avenue on the Canarsie Line and Manhattan provided rush-hour local service on Broadway. When the 14th Street–Eastern Line and Canarsie Line were connected on July 14, 1928, the old Canarsie Line service was renamed the Broadway (Brooklyn) Line, providing only weekday local service over the Broadway Elevated west of Eastern Parkway. The Atlantic Avenue trips remained, and rush-hour trains continued to serve Rockaway Parkway (Canarsie), though they did not use the Broadway express tracks. The 14 was later cut back to only rush-hour service.

On the Manhattan end, the first extension was made on September 16, 1908, when the Williamsburg Bridge subway tracks opened. Broadway and Canarsie trains were extended to the new Essex Street terminal, and further to Chambers Street when the line was extended on August 4, 1913. When the BMT Nassau Street Line was completed on May 30, 1931, the 15 was extended to Broad Street, and the 14 was truncated to Canal Street.

Weekday midday 14 Broadway-Brooklyn Local and midday 15 Jamaica Express service was discontinued on June 26, 1952. Some 14 trains began terminating at Crescent Street on the Jamaica Line in 1956.

Manhattan-bound rush hour skip-stop service between Jamaica and East New York was implemented on June 18, 1959, with trains leaving 168th Street on weekdays between 7 a.m. and 8:30 a.m. Express 15 trains served "A" stations, while the morning 14 became the Jamaica Local, running between Jamaica and Canal Street, and stopped at stations marked "B". Express 15 trains continued to run express between Eastern Parkway and Canal Street, making only stops at Myrtle Avenue, Essex Street, and Canal Street. These stations were as follows:

- All trains: 168th Street • Sutphin Boulevard • 75th Street–Elderts Lane • Eastern Parkway • Myrtle Avenue • Essex Street • Canal Street
- "A" stations: 168th Street • Sutphin Boulevard • 121st Street • 111th Street • Woodhaven Boulevard • 85th Street–Forest Parkway • Elderts Lane • Crescent Street • Cleveland Street • Eastern Parkway
- "B" stations: 168th Street • 160th Street • Sutphin Boulevard • Queens Boulevard • Metropolitan Avenue • 104th Street • Elderts Lane • Cypress Hills • Norwood Avenue • Van Siclen Avenue • Alabama Avenue • Eastern Parkway

Letters were assigned to most BMT services in the early 1960s. The BMT Jamaica services retained their numbers until November 1967. The 15 became the J (express), and the 14 became the JJ.

=== Chrystie Street Connection to 1977 ===
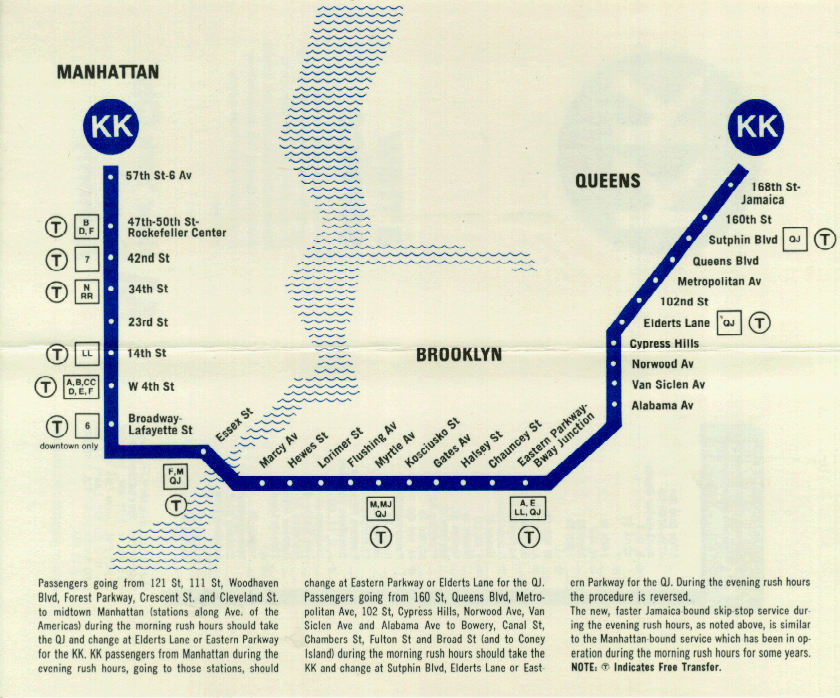
A new service brochure map for the KK service

When the Chrystie Street Connection opened on November 26, 1967, many services were changed. The two local services – the #15 (non-rush hour Jamaica local) and #14 (rush hour Broadway-Brooklyn local) – continued as the JJ without any major routing changes. Thus non-rush hour JJ trains ran between Jamaica and Broad Street, while morning rush hour JJ trains ran to Canal Street, and afternoon rush hour JJ trains ran between Canal Street and Atlantic Avenue or Crescent Street. The rush-hour express J was combined with the weekday QT Brighton Local via tunnel to form the weekday QJ, running between Jamaica and Brighton Beach via the Jamaica Line (express during rush hours in the peak direction), BMT Nassau Street Line, Montague Street Tunnel, and BMT Brighton Line (local). Finally, the RJ was a special peak-direction rush-hour service, running local on the Jamaica Line in the AM, express in the PM, Nassau Street Line, Montague Street Tunnel, and BMT Fourth Avenue Line to 95th Street in Fort Hamilton. This service served two purposes: (1) early AM service from Jamaica prior to the first QJ trains got the equipment to 95th Street in Brooklyn in time for the AM rush, and obviated the need to have early service to Brighton Beach; and (2) in the evening, trains returned from 95th Street in Brooklyn to Jamaica, allowing the QJ to avoid having to run on the Brighton Line in the Manhattan direction post-rush hour.

The next change was made on July 1, 1968, when the Chrystie Street Connection tracks to the Williamsburg Bridge opened. A new service, KK, was instituted that provided skip-stop service from 168th Street/Jamaica along with the QJ in both AM and PM rush hours; because of the limited skip-stop time spans, other terminals for the KK included Rockaway Parkway, Atlantic Avenue, Eastern Parkway and 111th Street. The KK provided service to 57th Street/6th Avenue, as the B served 168th Street-Washington Heights during rush hours; during non-rush hours, the B began serving 57th Street/6th Avenue. The MM (depicted with a dark green bullet on R27 signage) had been proposed as a supplement to the KK as a local to 57th Street–Sixth Avenue, but was kept as the M and extended from Chambers Street to Broad Street. The RJ was eliminated, being cut north of Chambers Street and relabeled as an RR variant, and the off-hour JJ was relabeled QJ. Less than two months later, on August 18, the QJ was extended to Coney Island–Stillwell Avenue, and the D cut back to Brighton Beach during QJ operating hours in order to avoid switching delays at Brighton Beach. On July 14, 1969, afternoon skip-stop service on the KK and QJ was discontinued due to rider complaints.

On January 2, 1973, the QJ, which was the longest route in the transit system, was cut back to Broad Street and redesignated the J; and the M was extended to Coney Island in its place. At the same time, the KK was cut back to Eastern Parkway from 168th Street and renamed the K, and both skip-stop patterns were carried out by alternate J trains between 7:25 a.m. and 8:12 a.m.. J trains making A stops trains stopped at 168th Street, Sutphin Boulevard, Metropolitan Avenue, 111th Street, Woodhaven Boulevard, Elderts Lane, Cypress Hills, Norwood Avenue, Van Siclen Avenue, and Eastern Parkway, while trains making B stops stopped at 168th Street, 160th Street, Queens Boulevard, 121st Street, 102nd Street, Forest Parkway, Elderts Lane, Crescent Street, Cleveland Street, and Eastern Parkway. All J trains would run express between Eastern Parkway and Essex Street between 6:00 a.m. and 9:05 a.m. from 168th Street, and from 3:35 p.m. to 7:00 p.m. leaving Essex Street.

The K was discontinued entirely on August 30, 1976, eliminating the J skip-stop and express service east of Myrtle Avenue in the evening rush hour. Skip-stop service was retained toward Manhattan during the morning rush hour. One-way express service remained west of Myrtle Avenue, for the M was switched to the local tracks at that time. On January 24, 1977, as part of a series of NYCTA service cuts to save $13 million, many subway lines began running shorter trains during middays. As part of the change, J trains began running with four cars between 9:15 a.m. and 1:15 p.m. On May 2, 1977, J trains began running in skip-stop service between Eastern Parkway and Myrtle Avenue. Chauncey Street and Gates Avenue were designated as A stops, while Halsey Street and Kosciusko Street were designated as B stops.

The following table summarizes the changes that were made between 1959 and 1976.

	Morning rush-hour local	Morning rush-hour express	Afternoon rush-hour local	Afternoon rush-hour express	Other local	Other express
1959–1967	14/KK 168th Street – Canal Street, "B" stops inbound	15/J 168th Street – Broad Street, "A" stops inbound	14/KK Crescent Street, Atlantic Avenue, or Rockaway Parkway – Canal Street	15/J 168th Street – Broad Street	15/JJ 168th Street – Broad Street	10/M Metropolitan Avenue – Chambers Street, rush hour only (west of Myrtle Avenue)
1967–1968	JJ 168th Street – Canal Street, "B" stops inbound	QJ 168th Street – Brighton Beach, "A" stops inbound	JJ Crescent Street or Atlantic Avenue – Canal Street	QJ 168th Street – Brighton Beach	JJ 168th Street – Broad Street; QJ 168th Street – Brighton Beach, middays and early evenings RJ 168th Street – Bay Ridge, rush hour non-peak direction only	M Metropolitan Avenue – Chambers Street, rush hour only (west of Myrtle Avenue)
1968–1974	KK 168th Street – 57th Street, "B" stops inbound	QJ 168th Street – Brooklyn, "A" stops inbound	KK 168th Street – 57th Street, "B" stops outbound	QJ 168th Street – Brooklyn, "A" stops outbound	QJ 168th Street – Broad Street or Brooklyn	M Metropolitan Avenue – Chambers Street, rush hour and (from 1969) middays and early evenings (west of Myrtle Avenue)
1974–1976	K Eastern Parkway – 57th Street	J 168th Street – Broad Street, two inbound patterns, one for "A" stops and one for "B" stops	K Eastern Parkway – 57th Street	J 168th Street – Broad Street, two outbound patterns, one for "A" stops and one for "B" stops	J 168th Street – Broad Street	M Metropolitan Avenue – Coney Island, rush hour, middays and early evenings (west of Myrtle Avenue)

=== 1977 to present ===
==== Archer Avenue Line ====
The J was truncated to Queens Boulevard just after midnight on September 11, 1977, and to 121st Street on April 15, 1985, as portions of the elevated Jamaica Line closed and were demolished. The Q49 shuttle bus replaced service at the closed stations until 1988. On December 1, 1980, AM rush hour skip-stop service was discontinued.

The BMT Archer Avenue Line was scheduled to open on December 11, 1988, extending the J east from 121st Street to Jamaica Center–Parsons/Archer. The Z designation, along with the present J/Z skip-stop service pattern, would be introduced the following day; skip-stop service operated between Sutphin Boulevard and Myrtle Avenue during weekday rush hours; in addition, both lines made express stops between Myrtle Avenue in Brooklyn and Canal Street in Manhattan, stopping at Marcy Avenue and Essex Street. All service terminated at Broad Street in Manhattan. Bus service on several Queens bus routes was rerouted to serve Jamaica Center instead of the 169th Street station several blocks away. The J/Z skip-stop service was touted, in an attempt to relieve some crowding on the IND Queens Boulevard Line, as being faster to lower Manhattan than E, F, and R service. Because the MTA hoped that Queens passengers would use the J/Z instead of the E, F, and R, every subway car on the J and Z's fleet was completely graffiti-free. The first J train along the Archer Avenue Line operated on December 10, arriving at Jamaica Center at 11:42 PM and departing the station at 11:53 PM.

One of the goals of the Archer Avenue project was to make Jamaica Line service as attractive as possible, and as a result the TA planned to provide a form of express service. The two options considered to speed up Jamaica Line service were skip-stop service, which would have split Jamaica services into two patterns that served alternate stops, and a zone-express service, which would have split Jamaica services into a short-turn local service and a full-length express services. The zone-express option was dismissed in favor of the skip-stop option because its operation has to be very precisely timed so as to not hinder reliability, because service in the outer zone past the boundary of zone express service at Crescent Street or 111th Street would be too infrequent, and because many stations would lose half their service. Outer-zone expresses, after Crescent Street would skip stops on the local track until Eastern Parkway, from where it would run on the express track, stopping at Myrtle Avenue before going straight to Essex Street in Manhattan, skipping Marcy Avenue. Outer-zone expresses and inner-zone locals would have each been limited to frequencies of 10 minutes.

The TA decided to implement skip-stop service with two services labeled "J" and "Z", with lightly-used stops designated as "J" or "Z" stops, and those with higher ridership being all-stop stations being served by both lines. The all-stop stations were Parsons Boulevard, Sutphin Boulevard, Woodhaven Boulevard, Crescent Street, Eastern Parkway, Myrtle Avenue, and Marcy Avenue, and all stops in Manhattan except for Bowery, which was to be served by only the M train. Bowery's low ridership did not justify more than one service to stop at the station; the J only stopped there weekday evenings, weekends during the daytime and overnights when the M did not operate into Manhattan. The J-only stops while skip-stop was operating were 111th Street, 85th Street, Cypress Hills, Cleveland Street, Alabama Avenue, Halsey Street and Kosciusko Street. The Z-only stops were 121st Street, 102nd Street, 75th Street, Norwood Avenue, Van Siclen Avenue, Chauncey Street and Gates Avenue. To further speed up service, J and Z trains would skip Flushing Avenue, Lorimer Street and Hewes Street. Trains on the J/Z ran every five minutes, an improvement over the previous frequency of eight minutes before skip-stop service began operating. Skip-stop service ran to Manhattan in the morning between 7:15 and 8:15 a.m. and to Jamaica between 4:45 and 5:45 p.m.

Weekday midday express service was added with J service continuing to run express in the peak direction between Marcy and Myrtle. Surveys of ridership at local stops found that service could be adequately provided by midday M service. The running time for skip-stop service from Parsons Boulevard to Broad Street was 49 1/2 minutes, compared to 54 1/2 minutes for all-local service and 52 minutes for the E. It was expected that 2,250 Queens Boulevard riders would switch to the J and Z. To make J/Z service more attractive, all trains on those lines consisted of refurbished subway cars that were more quiet, graffiti-free, and had improved lighting and new floors. All cars on the J/Z were expected to have air-conditioning by summer 1989.

Express service was not implemented between Broadway Junction and Myrtle Avenue because local service would have needed to be operated between those points in addition to the J and Z. The two terminals for such a service (57th Street and Broad Street) lacked spare capacity, although it was acknowledged that 57th Street on the IND Sixth Avenue Line could be used as a terminal once Manhattan Bridge subway-track repairs were completed.

Queens Borough President Claire Schulman made multiple recommendations about revisions to the service plan for the extension at the MTA's February 1988 board meeting. She recommended that trains should use the express track between Myrtle Avenue and Eastern Parkway to reduce travel times, and that the Chrystie Street Connection be reused for service to the Jamaica Line.

==== Post-1990 changes ====
On September 30, 1990, as part of several systemwide service changes, weekend J service was cut back from Broad Street to Canal Street, but was extended back to Chambers Street on December 19, 1993.

From May 1 to September 1, 1999, the Williamsburg Bridge was closed for reconstruction. J trains ran only between Jamaica Center and Myrtle Avenue; Z trains and skip-stop service operated in both directions between Jamaica Center and Eastern Parkway-Broadway Junction. During the closure, B39 bus service over the Williamsburg Bridge was free. The closure was anticipated to last until October 1999, but regular subway service was restored one month ahead of schedule. The project cost $130 million, including replacing the tracks support structure, signal system and other equipment. On September 1, J trains began stopping at the Bowery station 24 hours. J trains previously skipped Bowery between 6 AM and 8 PM on weekdays when the M was operating into Manhattan. The Z also began stopping at Bowery during its hours of operation for the first time ever on this day.

After the September 11, 2001 attacks, the Z and skip-stop services were suspended, and the J was initially cut back from Broad Street to Broadway Junction, but service got restored to as far as Essex Street on the evening of September 12 and made all stops along the route. On September 17, J trains were extended beyond Broad Street via the Montague Street Tunnel during daytime hours and originated and terminated at Bay Ridge–95th Street to replace the R, which got suspended; trains made all stops along the full route. Overnight service was split into two sections, with the northern section operating between Jamaica Center and either Broad Street or Chambers Street, (Note: The southern terminal for weekday overnight service was Broad Street, and for weekend overnight service was Chambers Street.) and the southern section operating as a shuttle between 36th and 95th Streets. Normal J service was restored on October 28; the Z and skip-stop services were restored on the following day.

On November 20, 2008, in light of severe budget woes, the MTA announced a slew of potential service cuts; among them was the potential elimination of the Z and skip-stop services. The J would make all stops between Sutphin Boulevard and Myrtle Avenue; weekday peak direction express service between Myrtle and Marcy Avenues would be retained. In May 2009, after the New York State Legislature passed legislation to offer financial support to the MTA, this planned service cut was taken off the table. However, on December 8, 2009, the MTA announced that a budget shortfall would once again result in service cuts, among them being the discontinuation of the Z and skip-stop services; the proposal to discontinue the Z and skip-stop services were withdrawn in March 2010, but other service cuts that the MTA proposed still took place in June of that year.

J and Z trains and skip-stop service was altered after Hurricane Sandy disrupted service around the transit system in 2012. J service was suspended entirely on the evening of October 28, but was restored on the morning of October 31; the Z and skip stop services remained suspended, and the J was initially cut back from Broad Street to Hewes Street and made all stops along the route. Service was restored to as far as Essex Street on November 3. The Z and skip-stop services resumed on November 19, with both J and Z trains originating and terminating at Chambers Street instead of Broad Street; service to Broad Street was restored on December 4.

In May 2014, all trains began stopping at Alabama Avenue, presumably for the convenience of transit employees who work at the nearby East New York Yard and East New York Bus Depot. In July 2014, the MTA proposed that weekend J service be extended from Chambers Street to Broad Street. The service change went into effect on June 14, 2015.

From June 26, 2017 to April 27, 2018, J and Z trains ran local between Broadway Junction and Marcy Avenue at all times, supplementing the M, due to the BMT Myrtle Avenue Line connection being closed for reconstruction.

In March 2020, Z trains and skip-stop service was temporarily suspended due to lack of ridership and train crew availability caused by the COVID-19 pandemic. Full service was restored in June 2020. From December 29, 2021, to January 19, 2022, Z trains and skip-stop service was again suspended due to a shortage of crew members exacerbated by the COVID-19 pandemic.

On July 1, 2022, J service was cut back to 121st Street, and Z trains and skip-stop service were suspended due to track replacement on the lower levels of the Jamaica Center and Sutphin Boulevard stations. Z train and J/Z skip-stop service was restored on September 19, 2022.

On February 26, 2023, Jamaica Center-bound J and Z trains skipped 75th Street-Elderts Lane and Woodhaven Boulevard until January 2024 as part of a four-phase station renovation project for both stations, as well as accessibility improvements and elevator installation for the latter. The second phase closed the Manhattan-bound platforms for both stops from early 2024 to mid-2024. Phase 3 closed down the Jamaica Center-bound platforms at Cypress Hills on July 22, 2024, and at 85th Street–Forest Parkway on August 12, 2024, for renovations until early 2025. Phase 4 closed the Manhattan-bound platforms down until July 21st, 2025. During those phases, J and Z trains would still operate skip-stop service between Myrtle Avenue-Broadway and Crescent Street, Brooklyn, but with both trains making all local stops to/from Sutphin Boulevard-Archer Avenue-JFK Airport, Queens, except for the affected stops. Weekend frequencies on the J route were increased in July 2023.

From June 28 to September 3, 2024, to accommodate riders displaced by the suspension of the G for signal modernization taking place on that route, peak-direction express service on the J and Z was suspended between Myrtle and Marcy Avenues, with both routes making all stops along this segment.

== Route ==
=== Signage history ===
BMT Numbered services

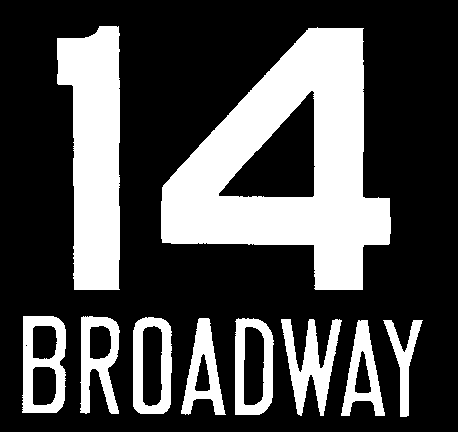
Pre-1967 bullet for the BMT 14 service (Current day J & L)

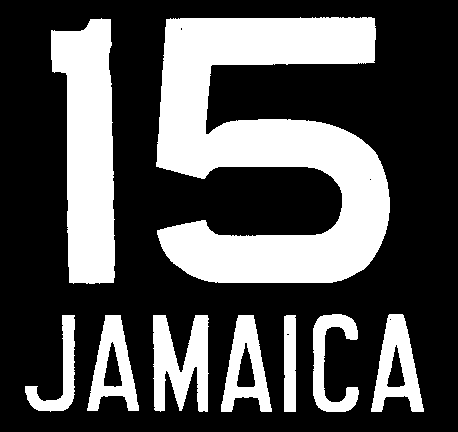
Pre-1967 bullet for the BMT 14 service (Current day J)
J/JJ/Z services

1967-1968 JJ bullet

1973-1979 J bullet (Former QJ)

1979-1988 Rush hour J bullet

Diamond Z bullet seen on old strip maps on the 4 train.

The current J bullet used since 1979

The current Z bullet used since 1988
K/KK services (Jamaica only)

1968-1973 KK bullet

1973-1976 K bullet, the K would eventually return in 1985 on 8th Avenue

=== Service pattern ===
The following table shows the lines used by the J and Z, with shaded boxes indicating the route at the specified times:

Line	From	To	Tracks	Times				
Line	From	To	Tracks	J service				Z service
Line	From	To	Tracks	middays	evenings	weekends	rush peak	rush peak
BMT Archer Avenue Line	Jamaica Center–York College	Sutphin Boulevard	all					
BMT Jamaica Line	121st Street	Myrtle Avenue	local (all)					
BMT Jamaica Line	121st Street	Myrtle Avenue	local (skip-stop)					
BMT Jamaica Line	Myrtle Avenue	Marcy Avenue	local					
BMT Jamaica Line	Myrtle Avenue	Marcy Avenue	express					
Williamsburg Bridge			all					
BMT Nassau Street Line	Essex Street	Broad Street	all					

=== Stations ===
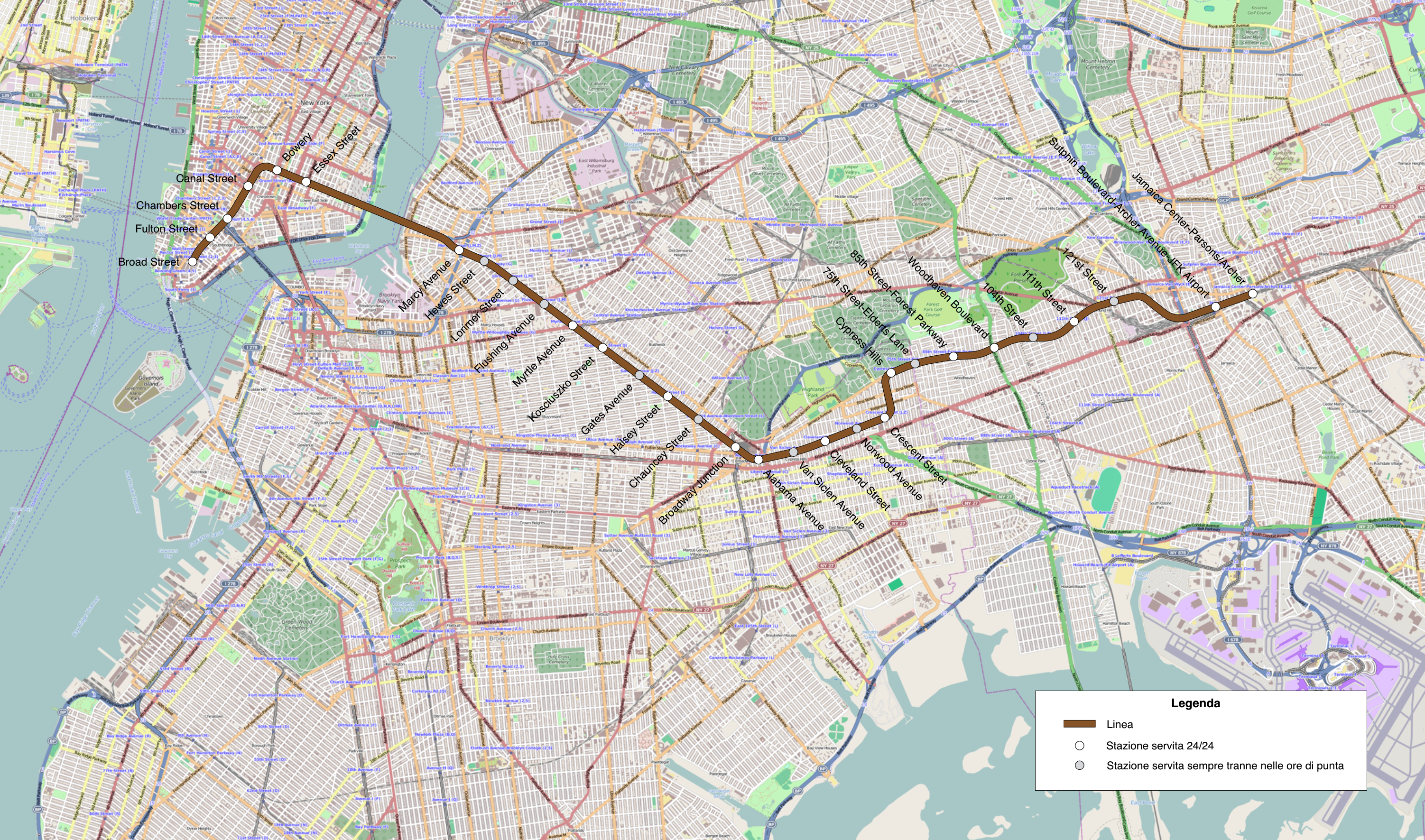
To scale J line map

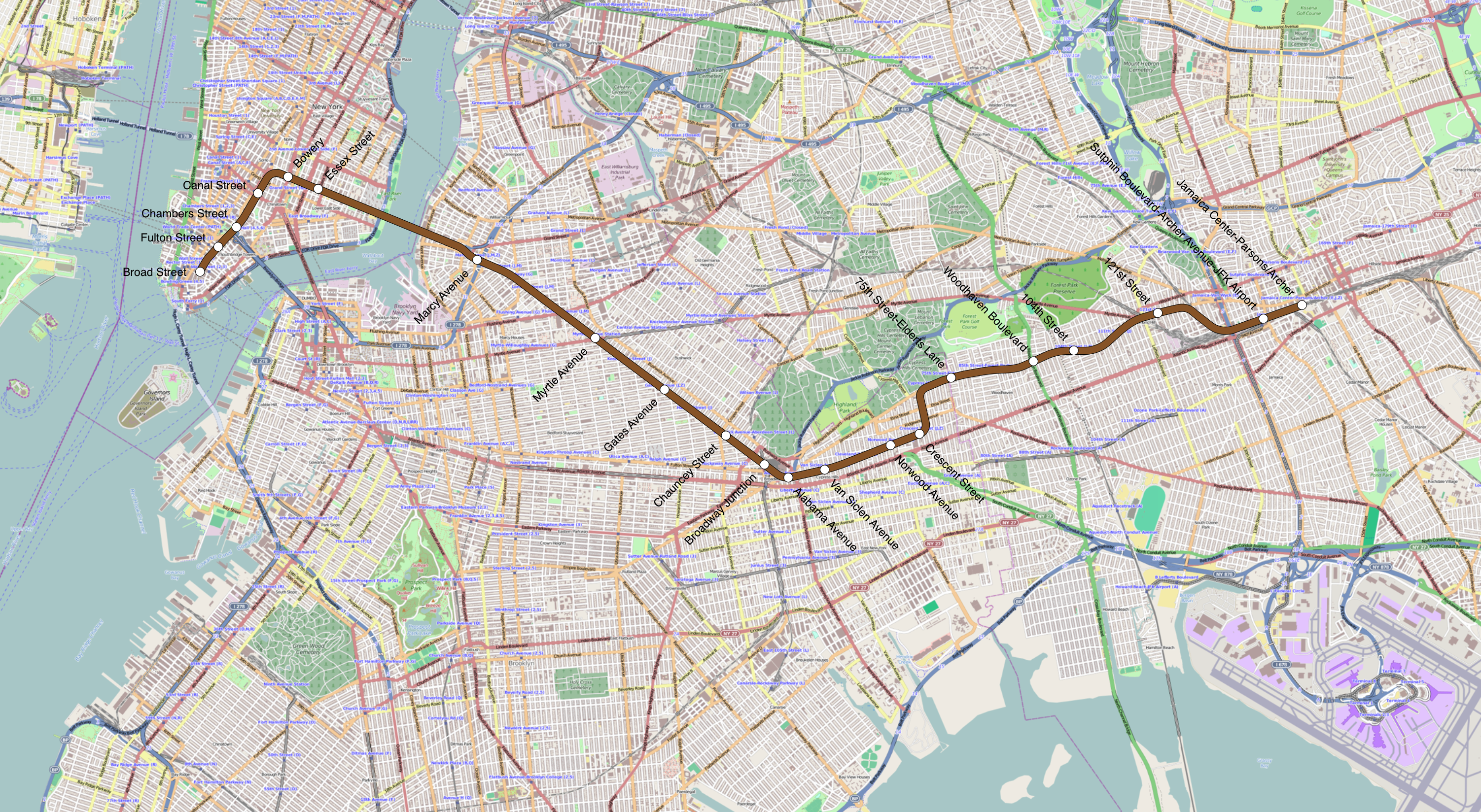
To scale Z line map

For a more detailed station listing, see the articles on the lines listed above.

Stations in green and stations in blue denote stops served by the J and Z, respectively, during rush hours in the peak direction. The J makes all stops at all other times. In case of severe winter weather, Z service and skip-stop patterns are suspended.

Station service legend
Stops all times	Stops 24 hours a day
Stops all times except late nights	Stops every day during daytime hours only
Stops late nights only	Stops every day during overnight hours only
Stops weekdays during the day	Stops during weekday daytime hours only
Stops all times except rush hours in the peak direction	Stops 24 hours a day, except during weekday rush hours in the peak direction
Stops rush hours in the peak direction only	Stops during weekday rush hours in the peak direction only
Time period details
Disabled access	Station is compliant with the Americans with Disabilities Act
↑	Station is compliant with the Americans with Disabilities Act in the indicated direction only
↓	Station is compliant with the Americans with Disabilities Act in the indicated direction only
	Elevator access to mezzanine only

J service	Z service	Stations	Disabled access	Subway transfers	Connections/Notes
Queens
Archer Avenue Line
Stops all times	Stops rush hours in the peak direction only	Jamaica Center–York College	Disabled access	E	Q44 Select Bus Service
Stops all times	Stops rush hours in the peak direction only	Sutphin Boulevard–Archer Avenue–JFK Airport	Disabled access	E	AirTrain JFK; LIRR at Jamaica; Q44 Select Bus Service
Jamaica Line
Stops all times except rush hours in the peak direction	Stops rush hours in the peak direction only	121st Street			Q10 and Q80 buses to JFK Airport
Stops all times		111th Street			
Stops all times except rush hours in the peak direction	Stops rush hours in the peak direction only	104th Street			
Stops all times	Stops rush hours in the peak direction only	Woodhaven Boulevard	Disabled access		Q52/Q53 Select Bus Service
Stops all times		85th Street–Forest Parkway			
Stops all times except rush hours in the peak direction	Stops rush hours in the peak direction only	75th Street–Elderts Lane			
Brooklyn
Stops all times		Cypress Hills			
Stops all times	Stops rush hours in the peak direction only	Crescent Street			
Stops all times except rush hours in the peak direction	Stops rush hours in the peak direction only	Norwood Avenue			
Stops all times		Cleveland Street			
Stops all times except rush hours in the peak direction	Stops rush hours in the peak direction only	Van Siclen Avenue			
Stops all times	Stops rush hours in the peak direction only	Alabama Avenue			
Stops all times	Stops rush hours in the peak direction only	Broadway Junction		A C (IND Fulton Street Line); L (BMT Canarsie Line)	LIRR Atlantic Branch at East New York; Some northbound a.m. rush hour trips begin/terminate at this station (Note: Some northbound trains begin their trips at this station and continue to Jamaica Center during the early a.m. rush hour; some northbound trains from Broad Street end their trips at this station during the late a.m. rush hour.); Some southbound p.m. rush hour trips begin at this station
Stops all times except rush hours in the peak direction	Stops rush hours in the peak direction only	Chauncey Street			
Stops all times		Halsey Street			
Stops all times except rush hours in the peak direction	Stops rush hours in the peak direction only	Gates Avenue			
Stops all times		Kosciuszko Street			B46 Select Bus Service
Stops all times	Stops rush hours in the peak direction only	Myrtle Avenue		M	
Stops all times except rush hours in the peak direction		Flushing Avenue	Disabled access	M	B15 bus to JFK Int'l Airport
Stops all times except rush hours in the peak direction		Lorimer Street		M	
Stops all times except rush hours in the peak direction		Hewes Street		M	
Stops all times	Stops rush hours in the peak direction only	Marcy Avenue	Disabled access	M	B44 Select Bus Service; NYC Ferry: East River Route (at South Tenth Street west of Kent Avenue)
Manhattan
Nassau Street Line
Stops all times	Stops rush hours in the peak direction only	Essex Street		M F <F> (IND Sixth Avenue Line at Delancey Street)	M14A Select Bus Service
Stops all times	Stops rush hours in the peak direction only	Bowery			
Stops all times	Stops rush hours in the peak direction only	Canal Street	Elevator access to mezzanine only	4 6 <6> (IRT Lexington Avenue Line); N Q R W (BMT Broadway Line)	
Stops all times	Stops rush hours in the peak direction only	Chambers Street	Disabled access	4 5 6 <6> (IRT Lexington Avenue Line at Brooklyn Bridge–City Hall)	
Stops all times	Stops rush hours in the peak direction only	Fulton Street	Disabled access	2 3 (IRT Broadway–Seventh Avenue Line); 4 5 (IRT Lexington Avenue Line); A C (IND Eighth Avenue Line)	Connection to N R W (BMT Broadway Line) at Cortlandt Street via Dey Street Passageway; PATH at World Trade Center
Stops all times	Stops rush hours in the peak direction only	Broad Street			M15 Select Bus Service; Staten Island Ferry at Whitehall Terminal
