= Skip-stop =

Public transit service pattern

Skip-stop is a public transit service pattern in which some or all services skip alternating stops, typically with two service patterns interleaved such that each local station receives half of the service, with all trains stopping at certain major stations (often interchanges). Originating in rapid transit systems, skip-stop services may be also used on suburban rail, light rail and bus systems.

A similar principle can be applied within buildings using elevators that stop at alternating floors and “skip-stop” can describe building designs that exploit this design and avoid corridors on alternating floors.

== Rationale ==
Skip-stop service is one solution to increasing train speed at minimal cost. In rapid transit systems in the United States, stations tend to be close together (approximately 800 metres (2,600 ft) in 1976), and so trains struggle to reach high speeds. The New York City Subway for example, the slowest in the United States, travels at an average speed of 17.4 miles per hour (28.0 km/h). Trains on the same track cannot pass each other like buses can, and so to increase speed, changes can only be made in terms of headway, or in which stations are served.

Skipping stations increases the average speed of trains, thus making journeys quicker and more appealing to commuters. There are certain drawbacks: for certain commuters skip-stop may actually increase journey times, and using the system may be more confusing. A long-term alternative is to build dedicated express tracks, however this comes at considerable cost and is rarely justified.

Analysis suggests that skip-stop operation is most appropriate for long rail lines, with many stations close together, operating with short headways, since the benefits disappear when any one of these is not met.

== History ==
The Cleveland Railway, Cleveland's streetcar operator implemented a skip-stop scheme under its new commissioner, Peter Witt in 1910. The scheme was more successful than an earlier attempt to implement skip-stop service in the city.

The Chicago Transit Authority initiated skip-stop service in 1948 as a means of speeding up old trains it inherited when it took over from private operators. The first skip-stop service was run on April 5 of that year on the Lake Street line with the North-South (Howard-Englewood/Jackson Park) and Ravenswood lines beginning skip-stop service on August 1 of the following year.

== Rail operation ==
Two types of trains stopping at different stations

When skip stops are used in rail transit, the transit operator designates stations as either major or minor, typically by ridership. Usually, all vehicles stop at the major stations, but only some vehicles stop at the minor ones.

Since one rail vehicle can only pass another by using an additional track, skip-stop may require additional investment in infrastructure if express services, where trains skip many stops along a route, are employed simultaneously with vehicles making stops on every station.

In systems that have no extra track for a faster train to pass a slower train, skip-stop may be employed either during busier travel hours to reduce travel time of a particular train, or during off-peak hours to raise efficiency by not stopping at "unpopular" stations.

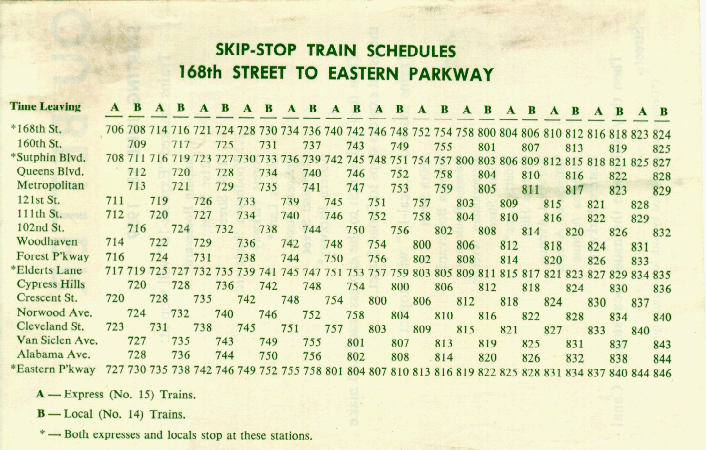
A timetable from 1959 showing skip-stop service on the New York City Subway's 14 and 15 services

In some systems, such as the New York City Subway, these are considered as two separate services (J/Z, and formerly the 1/9, which was discontinued in May 2005), as if the two services were separate lines instead of two different stopping patterns on the same line. On other systems, the alternating services are distinguished by lights on the train. For example, the Santiago Metro – which runs skip-stop services on line 2, line 4, and line 5 during the morning and evening rush hours – use trains with red marker lights stop only at the minor stations that are located on the red route (la ruta roja) and trains with green marker lights that stop only at the minor stations that are located on the green route (la ruta verde). There are some stations where all trains stop, which are known as common stations (estaciones comunes); common stations allow passengers to change between trains to get to their final destination.

The Chicago "L" used skip-stop service (noted as "A" and "B" services) from the 1940s until the mid 1990s, at which point it was discontinued in favor of all-stop service. This was done to reduce waiting times for passengers riding to or from "A" and "B" stations who could only take half of the trains. It also eliminated the need for a train transfer for passengers riding from an "A" station to a "B" station, which required a transfer at an "AB" (all trains stop) station to complete their trip. Further, the system was simpler to use for new riders and visitors.

Philadelphia's SEPTA Market-Frankford Line also used skip-stop service (also noted as "A" and "B" services) from 1956 until February 2020, at which point it was discontinued in favor of all-stop service.

In Australia, Adelaide's suburban rail Gawler Line only has 2 tracks. To speed up service, starting in 2008, it uses skip-stop operation on weekdays, where trains only stop at alternating sets of minor stations, while all trains stop at major stops known as "High Frequency Stations".

== Bus operation ==
In bus operations, skip-stop refers to a stopping pattern where buses do not stop at every block or at every designated bus stop, typically in a central business district. Skip-stop operation reduces travel time and increases the number of buses that the streets and bus stops are able to accommodate. With skip-stop operations, bus routes are typically grouped together by geographic area in order to provide a common stop for areas that are served by multiple routes. The skip-stop groups are sometimes identified by color or letter so that passengers and bus operators can easily identify their desired stop. A disadvantage with skip-stops is that passengers may have to walk farther or change buses to catch their intended bus, which increases travel time. Passengers may also be unsure about which bus stop to walk towards to catch their intended bus.

Skip-stops work best when buses are able to easily pass each other at bus stops, such as on a low-traffic street, street with bus stop pockets or dedicated busway with at least two lanes in each direction. If there is a large amount of other traffic on the street or only a single bus lane is provided, then buses have difficulty passing each other and much of the benefit of using skip-stops is not realized.

In Seattle, WA, which has an extensive local and regional bus system operated by three different transit agencies, skip-stops are used on 2nd, 3rd, and 4th Avenues in the downtown area. Bus routes on 3rd Avenue are grouped into Blue and Yellow stops, while bus routes on 2nd and 4th Avenue are grouped into Red and White stops.

In Portland, Oregon, buses of TriMet and C-Tran use skip stops on the Portland Transit Mall in Downtown Portland. The practice has been in use on the mall since its opening in 1977, and was continued (for buses) after MAX Light Rail was added to the mall in 2009. Buses stop at every third or fourth bus stop. Until 2007, the bus stops for the different groups of routes were identified by colors and symbols, such as "Yellow Rose" and "Orange Deer", but with the rebuilding for the addition of light rail, those designations were replaced by simple letters—A, B, C, D for southbound on 5th Avenue and W, X, Y, Z for northbound on 6th Avenue.

This term may also refer to limited-stop bus services.

== In popular culture ==
In The Honeymooners, Episode 32, "Opportunity Knocks But", Ed Norton (Art Carney) impresses Ralph Kramden (Jackie Gleason)'s boss with his suggestions for improving the bus company, including the offering of "odd" and "even" lines.

== See also ==
- Limited-stop
- Express train
