= IND Sixth Avenue Line =

New York City Subway line

- The B, D, F, <F>, and M trains, which use the Sixth Avenue Line through Midtown Manhattan, are colored orange.

Overview
- Owner: City of New York
- Locale: Manhattan, New York City
- Termini: South of 59th Street–Columbus Circle; 57th Street; North of Jay Street–MetroTech; south of Grand Street
- Stations: 14

Service
- Type: Rapid transit
- System: New York City Subway
- Operator: New York City Transit Authority
- Daily ridership: 400,687

History
- Opened: January 1, 1936; 90 years ago
- Last extension: 1968

Technical
- Num of tracks: 2–4
- Character: Underground
- Track gauge: 4 ft 8 1/2 in (1,435 mm) standard gauge
- Electrification: Third rail, 625 V DC

The IND Sixth Avenue Line is a rapid transit line of the B Division of the New York City Subway in the United States. It runs mainly under Sixth Avenue in Manhattan, and continues south to Brooklyn. The B, D, F, and M trains, which use the Sixth Avenue Line through Midtown Manhattan, are colored orange. The B and D trains use the express tracks, while the F, <F> and M trains use the local tracks.

The Sixth Avenue Line, constructed in stages during the 1930s, was the last trunk line built by the Independent Subway System (IND) before it was incorporated into the modern-day New York City Subway. It was more difficult to build than other subway trunk lines in New York City because construction had to proceed around, over, and under existing tunnels and elevated structures. The Sixth Avenue Line replaced the Interborough Rapid Transit Company (IRT)'s Sixth Avenue elevated, which closed in 1939. The first section of the line opened in 1936 from West Fourth Street to East Broadway with service provided by Eighth Avenue Line trains. This section was initially referred to as the Houston-Essex Street Route. The Sixth Avenue subway was completed in 1940, providing service north of West Fourth Street, connecting to the Queens Boulevard Line and the Eighth Avenue Line.

Initially, the Sixth Avenue Line carried only local service, since there were no express tracks between 34th Street and West 4th Street. In 1967 and 1968, the Chrystie Street Connection was completed, connecting the line with former BMT lines in Brooklyn via the Manhattan Bridge and with the BMT Jamaica Line over the Williamsburg Bridge. Two new stations at 57th Street and Grand Street, as well as a pair of express tracks between 34th and West 4th Streets, were built to provide the necessary capacity for the new service to Brooklyn.

There are branches on both ends of the line. On the south end, the express tracks used by the B and D trains diverge to Grand Street and the Manhattan Bridge. The local tracks continue through the Rutgers Street Tunnel and to York Street in Brooklyn (used by the F and <F> trains) or via the Chrystie Street Connection and the Williamsburg Bridge to the BMT Jamaica Line in Brooklyn (used by the M train). On the north end, north of 47th–50th Streets–Rockefeller Center, the express tracks diverge to Seventh Avenue–53rd Street and the IND Eighth Avenue Line, while a spur used by the F and M trains continues under Sixth Avenue to 57th Street and the 63rd Street Lines; the local tracks, used by the F and <F> trains, merge with the IND Queens Boulevard Line and continue to Queens.

== Extent and service ==
The following services currently use part or all of the Sixth Avenue Line, whose services' bullets are colored orange:

	Time period				Section of line
	Rush hours	Middays and evenings	Weekends	Late nights	Section of line
"B" train	express		no service		full line from Seventh Avenue to Grand Street
"D" train	express				full line from Seventh Avenue to Grand Street
"F" train	local				between 47th–50th Streets–Rockefeller Center and York Street (weekdays) full line from 57th Street to York Street (weekends and late nights)
"F" express train	local	no service			between 47th–50th Streets–Rockefeller Center and York Street
"M" train	local		no service		between 57th Street and Broadway–Lafayette Street

The majority of the Sixth Avenue Line has four tracks, two local and two express. At each end, these pairs of tracks split, giving the line two north and two south ends. One of the north ends is at 57th Street, where two tracks lead south under Sixth Avenue from the IND 63rd Street Line (used by the M train on weekdays and the F train on weekends and late nights). The other is just south of 59th Street–Columbus Circle, where a two-track line splits from the IND Eighth Avenue Line at a flying junction (with connections to the local and express tracks), immediately turns east under 53rd Street, and crosses the IND Queens Boulevard Line, which parallels it just to the north. At Seventh Avenue, the southbound track is above the northbound track (the same is true on the Queens Boulevard Line, though north is the opposite direction from the Sixth Avenue Line). These tracks are used by the B and D express trains.

The express tracks from Columbus Circle then turn south to go under Sixth Avenue, merging with the branch from 57th Street and the local tracks' split from the IND Queens Boulevard Line (used by the F local train). The branch from 57th Street merges into both the local and express track pairs; there are no direct track connections between the local and express tracks. South of this point, the Sixth Avenue Line consists of four tracks from west to east: the southbound express track, the southbound local track, the northbound express track, and the northbound local track. After passing through 47th–50th Streets–Rockefeller Center, the two southbound tracks cross each other; the tracks from Columbus Circle become the two center express tracks, and the tracks from the Queens Boulevard Line are the two outside local tracks.

South of 42nd Street–Bryant Park is a large interlocking with six crossovers and switches. The original express tracks ended just to the south at 34th Street–Herald Square and some services switched to the local tracks at the interlocking. This was done because the PATH's Uptown Hudson Tubes already existed under Sixth Avenue south of 33rd Street, and so the Sixth Avenue Line local tracks were built on each side of PATH. The section between West Fourth Street–Washington Square and 34th Street–Herald Square, the only express section of this line, was originally built as a two-track subway with the provision to expand to four tracks later. The express tracks were added in the 1960s in conjunction with the Chrystie Street Connection project. As a result, they are placed under the local tracks and PATH using the deep-bore tunneling method. At West Fourth Street–Washington Square, the express tracks return to the same level as the local tracks, and the two pairs of tracks in each direction are connected with diamond crossovers. A flying junction just to the south connects the local tracks of the Sixth and Eighth Avenue Lines. The Sixth Avenue Line then turns east under Houston Street with an express station at Broadway–Lafayette Street.

East of Broadway–Lafayette Street, the express tracks turn south and use the Chrystie Street Connection to Grand Street before crossing the north side of the Manhattan Bridge into Brooklyn. The express tracks used to continue on to the express tracks at Second Avenue before the tracks were rerouted to the Chrystie Street Connection. The local tracks split at this point. One pair continues east to Second Avenue (used by the F train) while the other pair merges with the BMT Nassau Street Line at Essex Street (used by the M train). Since the IND typically installed express–local crossovers beyond the fronts of the station platforms, an anomaly in the track layout was created when the Chrystie Street Connection was built. A crossover exists west of Broadway–Lafayette Street only on the northbound side, allowing trains from the Manhattan Bridge to reach the Eighth Avenue local tracks at West Fourth Street but not vice versa. As a result, unusual routings are required whenever a train on the Eighth Avenue Line needs to access the Manhattan Bridge. (Note: For instance, during a 2020 service change when the D train was rerouted via the Eighth Avenue Line's local tracks north of West Fourth Street, it ran on the IND Culver Line (the F train's normal route in Brooklyn). The F train ran on the BMT West End Line (the D train's normal route in Brooklyn).)

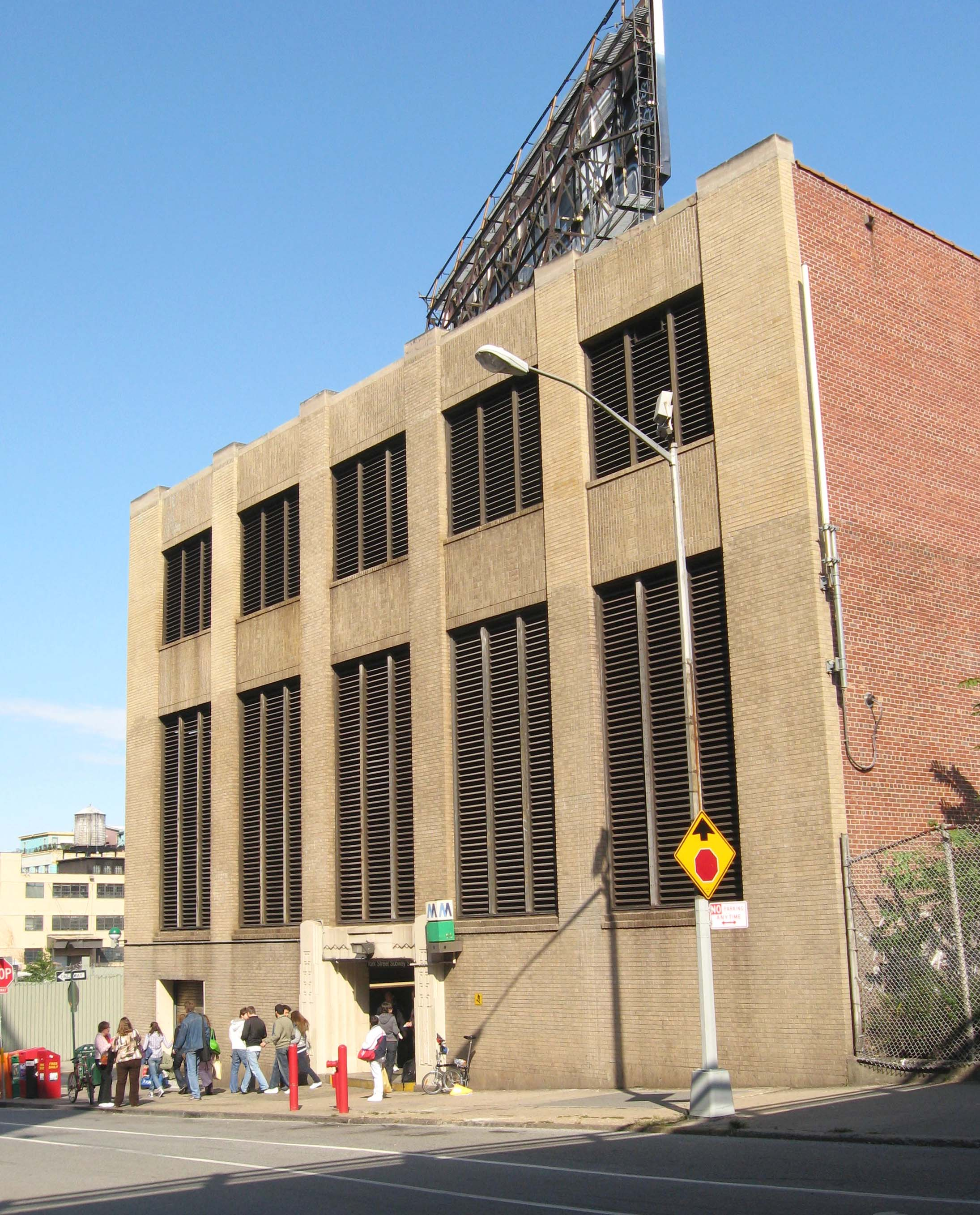
York Street ventilation tower for Rutgers Street tunnel

Just before approaching Second Avenue, the local tracks split into four tracks again. The two center tracks, which are not used in revenue service, dead-end just east of the Second Avenue station. They were built as part of the IND's proposed expansion in the 1930s, and would have merged with the never-built IND Worth Street Line and then entered Brooklyn. The line would have run to Utica Avenue in Brooklyn if it had been completed. Other provisions for unbuilt lines exist at the mezzanine levels of the Second Avenue and East Broadway stations, where unfinished open spaces indicate where stations for the Second Avenue Subway and IND Worth Street Line, respectively, would have been built.

The local tracks in Manhattan turn south under Essex Street and Rutgers Street before crossing under the East River via the Rutgers Street Tunnel. The tracks then become IND Culver Line in Brooklyn, stopping at the outer tracks of Jay Street–MetroTech.

== History ==
=== Planning ===
New York City mayor John Francis Hylan's original plans for the Independent Subway System (IND), proposed in 1922, included building over 100 miles (160 km) of new lines and taking over nearly 100 miles (160 km) of existing lines. The lines were designed to compete with the existing underground, surface, and elevated lines operated by the Interborough Rapid Transit Company (IRT) and Brooklyn–Manhattan Transit Corporation (BMT). The IND Sixth Avenue Line was designed to replace the elevated IRT Sixth Avenue Line. However, since the Sixth Avenue corridor was such an important subway link, the elevated remained open while construction on the Sixth Avenue subway proceeded.

In 1924, the IND submitted its list of proposed subway routes to the New York City Board of Transportation (NYCBOT), which approved the program. The IND's program consisted of two lines underneath Sixth Avenue in Manhattan. The first line would be a 0.74-mile-long (1.19 km) section in Lower Manhattan between Lispenard Street to the south and Eighth Street to the north, comprising part of the present-day Eighth Avenue Line. The second line would be a 2.47-mile-long (3.98 km) section running between Carmine Street to the south and 53rd Street to the north, comprising much of the present-day Sixth Avenue Line. South of Carmine Street, the Sixth Avenue Line would curve east under Houston Street, then south under Essex Street and Rutgers Street before continuing south into Brooklyn.

Work on the core section of the IND Sixth Avenue Line, located between Fourth and 53rd Streets, was not to begin for several years. The section of Sixth Avenue from Ninth to 33rd Streets was already occupied by the Hudson & Manhattan Railroad (H&M)'s Uptown Hudson Tubes. At first, the city intended to take over the portion of the Uptown Tubes under Sixth Avenue for IND use, then build a pair of new tubes for the H&M directly underneath it. The IND had committed to building the Sixth Avenue line, and the H&M's 33rd Street terminal was located both above and below preexisting railroad tunnels, hence the IND's plan to convert part of the H&M tubes. However, the H&M objected, and so negotiations between the city and IND and the H&M continued for several years.

The IND and H&M finally came to an agreement in 1930. The city had decided to build the IND Sixth Avenue Line's local tracks around the pre-existing H&M tubes, and add express tracks for the IND underneath the H&M tubes at a later date. However, the city still planned to eventually take over the H&M tracks, convert them to express tracks for the IND line, then build a lower level for the H&M.

The IND started advertising bids for the section of the Sixth Avenue Line between 43rd and 53rd Streets in April 1931. However, that May, construction was postponed because of fears that it would disrupt the Catskill Aqueduct, one of the New York City water supply system's crucial water mains to Brooklyn and Queens. The NYCBOT wanted to start work on the section between 33rd and 39th Streets first so that the engineering issues with the H&M tubes and water main could be resolved. In January 1932, the city announced an agreement with the New York City Water Supply Board. The IND wanted to start construction on the Sixth Avenue line by June so that some of the projected train traffic on the Eighth Avenue line, which was slated to open that year, could be rerouted through Sixth Avenue instead. In 1933, the New York City Board of Estimate requested a $25.5 million federal loan for the construction of the Sixth Avenue line.

=== Opening of southern section ===
The first portion of the line to be constructed was then known as the Houston–Essex Street Line, which ran under Houston, Essex, and Rutgers Streets. The contract for the line was awarded to Corson Construction in January 1929, at which time the city began evicting 10,000 residents within the line's route. Construction of this section officially started in May 1929. The contract for the Rutgers Street Tunnel, connecting Manhattan and Brooklyn, was awarded in May 1930. In May 1933, the city started widening Essex and Rutgers Streets to accommodate the future subway line underneath.

The Houston and Essex Street Line began operations at noon on January 1, 1936, with two local tracks from a junction with the Eighth Avenue Line south of West Fourth Street–Washington Square east under Houston Street and south under Essex Street to a temporary terminal at East Broadway. E trains, which ran from Jackson Heights, Queens to Hudson Terminal, were shifted to the new line to East Broadway. Two express tracks were built on the portion under Houston Street until Essex Street-Avenue A; the tracks were intended to travel under the East River and connect with the never-built IND Worth Street Line in Williamsburg, Brooklyn.

Just after midnight on April 9, 1936, trains began running under the East River via the Rutgers Street Tunnel, which connected the Houston-Essex Street Line with the north end of the Culver Line at a junction with the Eighth Avenue Line north of Jay Street–Borough Hall. E trains were sent through the connection to Church Avenue. Simultaneously, the Fulton Street Line was opened to Rockaway Avenue and the A and C trains, which had used Smith Street, were rerouted to Fulton Street.

=== Construction and opening of Midtown section ===
In April 1935, engineers started planning in earnest for the Midtown section of the Sixth Avenue Line. The first contract, for the section between 40th and 47th Streets, was awarded to Rosoff-Brader Construction in October 1935. Mayor Fiorello H. La Guardia broke ground for the Sixth Avenue subway at Bryant Park on March 23, 1936. The Carleton Company was hired in September 1936 to construct the section from 27th to 33rd Streets, and Rosoff-Brader was hired that October to build the segment from 33rd to 40th Streets. The next month, the George A. Flynn Corporation received a contract for the construction of the section between 47th and 53rd Streets. The Arthur A. Johnson Corp. and Necaro Co. received the contract to build the segment between 18th and 27th Streets in January 1937. The final contract, between 9th and 18th Streets, was awarded to Spencer White & Prentis in June 1937.

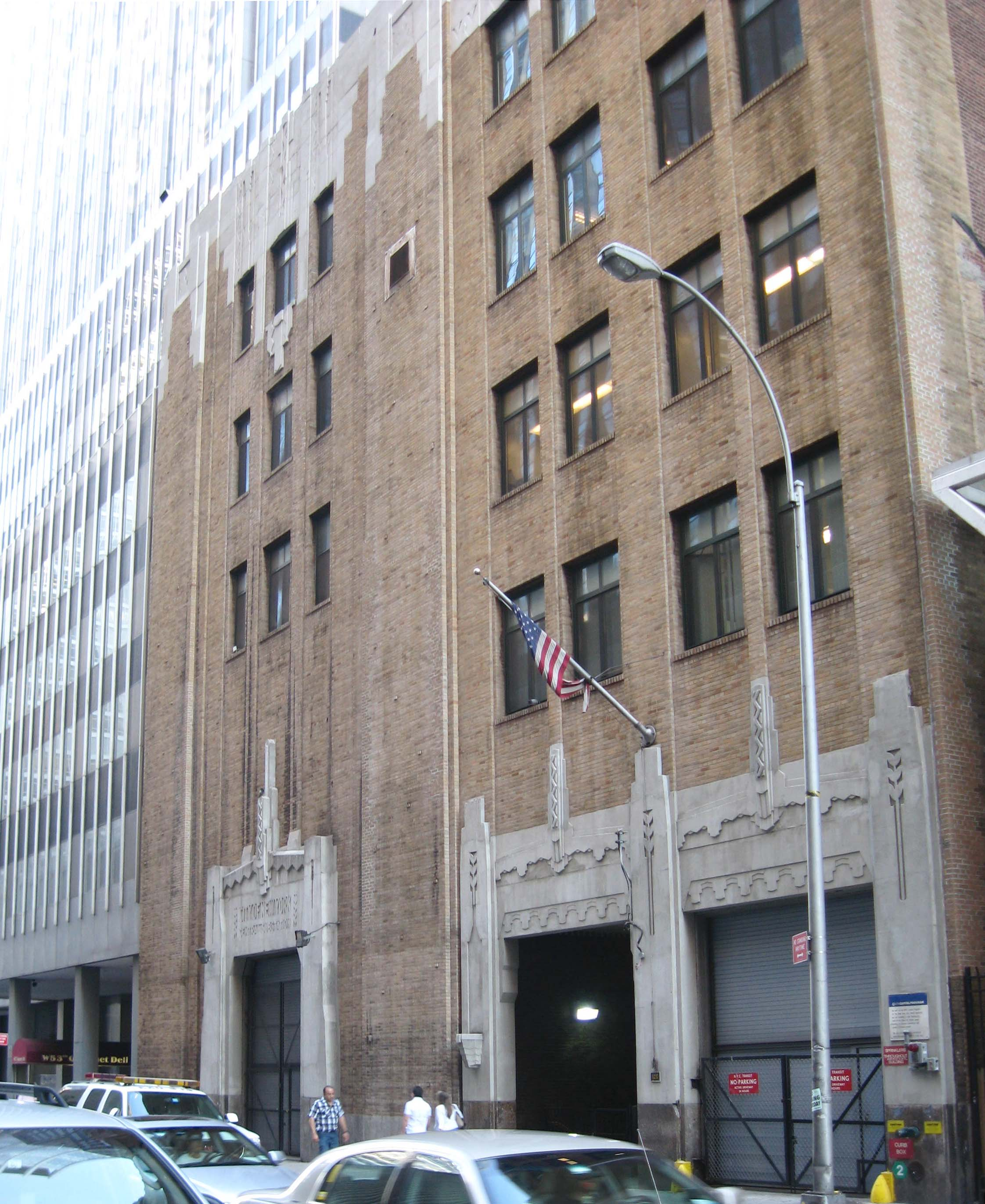
53rd Street powerhouse

The construction of the Sixth Avenue Line was very difficult because of the various utilities and tunnels above, below, and beside the line. At the time, it was considered the costliest subway line in the city. The line was built as a four-track tunnel north of 33rd Street, but there were only two tracks south of that street. The work largely involved cut-and-cover excavations, although portions of the subway had to be tunneled through solid rock. Builders had to use very small charges of dynamite so that they would not disrupt the H&M tunnels alongside the route, the street and elevated line above, and the water main below. The Sixth Avenue Elevated had to be underpinned during construction, adding another $4 to $5 million to construction costs. The Catskill Aqueduct was located around 200 feet (61 m) below the avenue's surface, and workers on the new subway had to be careful to not cause any cracks in the aqueduct. As part of the construction of the IND line, the H&M's 14th Street and 23rd Street stations had to be rebuilt to provide space for the IND's 14th Street and 23rd Street stations, which would be located at a similar elevation. The 19th Street station was not affected because the IND tracks were located below the H&M tracks at that point. However, the 33rd Street station had to be relocated to the south of its existing location, above the new IND line. The IND platforms were to be located at the same elevation as the present H&M station, and there was no room to build a new subway station either above or below the level of the existing H&M station.

The H&M's 33rd Street terminal closed on December 26, 1937, and service on the H&M was cut back to 28th Street to allow for construction on the subway to take place. The 33rd Street terminal was moved south to 32nd Street and reopened on September 24, 1939. The city had to pay $800,000 to build the new 33rd Street station and reimbursed H&M another $300,000 to the H&M for the loss of revenue. The 28th Street station was closed at this time because the southern entrances to the 33rd Street terminal were located only two blocks away, rendering the 28th Street stop unnecessary. It was demolished to make room for the IND tracks below. The IRT's Sixth Avenue elevated ultimately closed in December 1938, just before the Sixth Avenue subway was completed.

In addition to threading around the H&M tunnel, the line had to pass over the BMT Canarsie Line along 14th Street, over the tunnels leading to Penn Station, under the four-track BMT Broadway Line at Herald Square, over the IRT Flushing Line at 41st Street, and under the 42nd Street Shuttle. Even though the line had to pass around multiple transit lines, the grades were kept to a minimum. The line included four-track stations at West Fourth, 34th, 42nd, and 47th–50th Streets. There were four sets of crossovers between 34th and 42nd Streets, and the southbound express track crossed over the southbound local track at a grade-separated flyover between 42nd and 47th–50th Streets. Bellmouth tunnels north of 47th–50th Streets were built to allow for a future extension under Central Park and along Morningside Avenue to 145th Street. This extension was part of the Board of Transportation's long-range program, and was estimated to cost $34.914 million as of August 1940. Construction was expected to start some time after 1946.

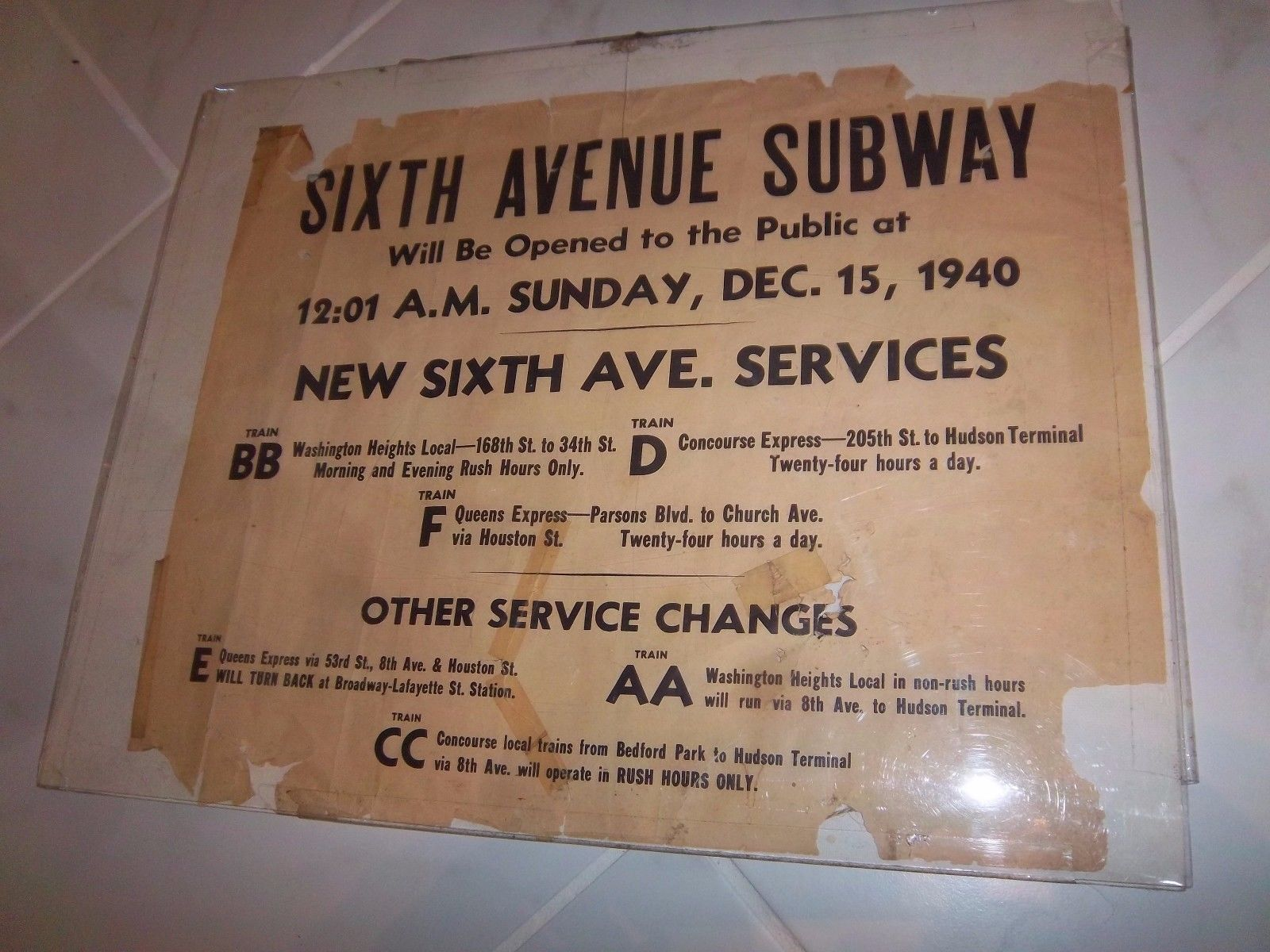
Sixth Avenue Subway Will Be Opened to the Public at 12:01 A.M. Sunday, December 15, 1940.

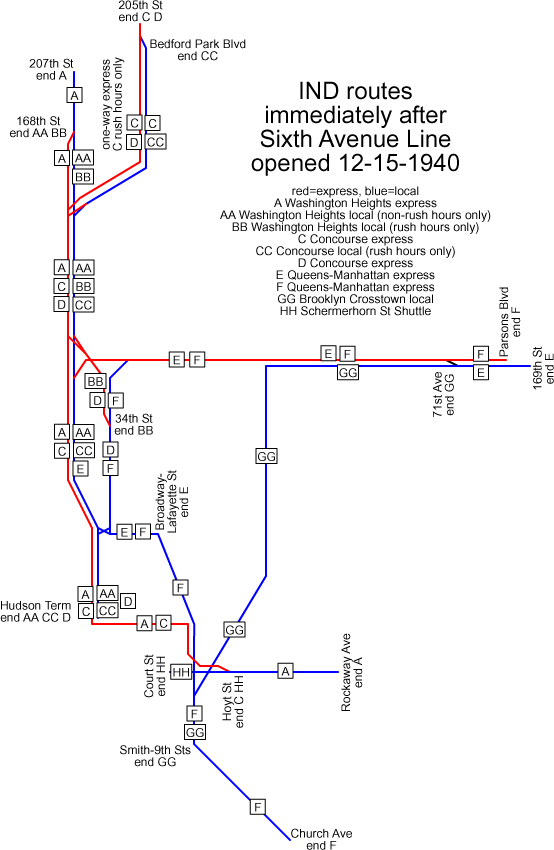
IND services immediately after the main part of the line opened

On December 15, 1940, local subway service began on Sixth Avenue from the West Fourth Street subway station to the 47th–50th Streets station with track connections to the IND 53rd Street Line. The construction of the Sixth Avenue Line cost $59.5 million. The opening of the Sixth Avenue Line relieved train traffic on the Eighth Avenue Line, which was used by all services except for the G Brooklyn–Queens Crosstown service. The additional capacity allowed for the reintroduction of the AA for off-peak service between 168th Street and Hudson Terminal via the Eighth Avenue Line, and the creation of the rush-hour BB between 168th Street and 34th Street-Herald Square via Sixth Avenue. In addition, the D train, which ran between Norwood–205th Street and Hudson Terminal via Sixth Avenue, was introduced to provide service between Sixth Avenue and the Concourse Line. The F train, running between Parsons Boulevard and Church Avenue via Sixth Avenue, was created to provide express service between Sixth Avenue and Queens. Finally, the E train was cut back from Church Avenue to Broadway–Lafayette Street, running to Queens via the Eighth Avenue Line.

=== Sixth Avenue express tracks and the Chrystie Street Connection ===
On April 19, 1961, ground was broken for a $22 million project to build two express tracks between the West Fourth Street and 34th Street–Herald Square stations. The express tracks were built 80 feet (24 m) beneath the surface. The construction was done in two portions. The first section was between West 9th and 19th Streets, and the second section was between West 19th and 31st Streets. The express tracks were part of an $80 million subway improvement program that began with the reconstruction of the DeKalb Avenue station in Brooklyn. The second phase of construction was the Chrystie Street Connection, which would connect the BMT lines coming over the Manhattan Bridge and the Williamsburg Bridge with the IND Houston Street Line. There was also to be a new two-track spur line between West 52nd and 58th Streets with a terminal at 57th Street to allow trains to short turn. The two projects would allow 45 additional trains per hour, carrying a combined 90,000 passengers, to enter Manhattan during rush hours.

However, the section between 9th and 19th Streets soon experienced various delays: although it had started in April 1961, work was halted by a water main break in 1962, and by July 1963, the work was only 20 percent complete. Construction on the section between West 19th and 31st Streets was further along: it had started in the middle of 1961, and was 60 percent complete in July 1963. The first section was 88 percent complete on June 30, 1965, and the second section was 99 percent complete on that date. Between West 55th and 58th Street, a third of the structural work was done by this date. No stations were constructed along the new express tracks, but provisions were incorporated into the design of the tunnel to permit the addition of future lower level stations at 14th Street and 23rd Street without disturbances to train operation.

On November 26, 1967, the first part of the Chrystie Street Connection opened and Sixth Avenue Line express tracks opened from 34th Street–Herald Square to West Fourth Street–Washington Square. With the opening of the connection to the Manhattan Bridge, BB service was renamed B and it was extended via the new express tracks and the connection to the BMT West End Line in Brooklyn. D service was routed via the connection and onto the BMT Brighton Line instead of via the Culver Line. It only ran express during rush hours. F service was extended from Broadway–Lafayette Street during rush hours, and from 34th Street during other times to Coney Island via the Culver Line. On July 1, 1968, the 57th Street station and the portion of the Chrystie Street Connection connecting the line with the Williamsburg Bridge opened. Service on the KK was inaugurated, running from 57th Street to 168th Street on the BMT Jamaica Line. B service was extended during non-rush hours from West Fourth Street to 57th Street. D trains began running express via the Sixth Avenue Line at all times.

=== Later improvements ===
The Program for Action, a series of subway and commuter rail expansions proposed by the MTA to then-Governor Nelson Rockefeller, included a spur of the line to the underserved Alphabet City neighborhood on the Lower East Side. The spur would run under Houston Street, Avenue C, and 14th Street. The branch's construction was delayed in 1971 after voters blocked a bond issue, then canceled along with most of the Program's new projects after the 1975–76 New York City fiscal crisis and extreme MTA fare revenue fluctuations.

The tracks at 57th Street were originally built for a proposed extension under Central Park to Harlem. The stub-end tracks were eventually connected to the IND 63rd Street Line when the latter opened in October 1989. The 63rd Street line only extended to the 21st Street–Queensbridge station in Queens, and did not connect to any other lines in that borough. The Q train served the 63rd Street extension on weekdays and the B train stopped there on the weekends; both services used the Sixth Avenue Line. The Q train, a part-time express within Brooklyn via the BMT Brighton Line, ran along the Sixth Avenue Line between 1988 and 2001, when the Manhattan Bridge south tracks were closed for reconstruction.

Planning for the 63rd Street Line's $645 million connection from the 21st Street–Queensbridge station to the IND Queens Boulevard Line in Queens began in December 1990, and construction began on September 22, 1994. The Connector came into regular use on December 16, 2001. A new Sixth Avenue local service, the V, was introduced operating local via Sixth Avenue and terminating in the center tracks of the Sixth Avenue Line's Second Avenue station. The V ran local on the Queens Boulevard Line, and it only operated during weekdays. At this time, the F, which ran express along the Queens Boulevard Line, was rerouted to operate via the 57th Street station and the 63rd Street line north of the 47th–50th Streets–Rockefeller Center station, rather than via the 53rd Street tunnel. Both the 63rd Street and the 53rd Street lines merge into the Queens Boulevard Line in Queens. On June 28, 2010, the V was replaced by the M, which began using the Chrystie Street Connection to the Williamsburg Bridge. Regular M trains make all former V stops except for Second Avenue.

In 2004, full Manhattan Bridge service was restored. This resulted in full B and D express service being restored from 34th Street–Herald Square to the Manhattan Bridge, where the services continued to Brooklyn. However, the terminals of the B and D were reversed from prior to the Manhattan Bridge service suspensions. B service operates weekdays only via the Brighton Line express tracks to Brighton Beach, replacing the <Q> express on the Brighton Line. D service operates 24/7 along the West End Line because residents of Bensonhurst, a neighborhood located near the West End Line, wanted full-time direct subway service to Manhattan.

The 2015–2019 Metropolitan Transportation Authority Capital Plan called for the Sixth Avenue Line's 23rd Street and 57th Street stations, along with 31 others, to undergo a complete overhaul as part of the Enhanced Station Initiative. Updates would include cellular service, Wi-Fi, USB charging stations, interactive service advisories and maps, improved signage, and improved station lighting. The renovations at both stations were supposed to last from July to December 2018. The renovations were conducted under a $124.9 million contract that also included the renovation of the 28th Street station on the IRT Lexington Avenue Line. 23rd Street reopened ahead of schedule on November 29, 2018, while 57th Street reopened on December 19, 2018.

As part of the 2015–2019 Capital Program, the 34th Street and West Fourth Street interlockings on the IND Sixth Avenue Line were upgraded at a cost of $356.5 million. The interlocking upgrades would support communications-based train control (CBTC) installation on the Queens Boulevard, Culver, and Eighth Avenue lines.

== Station listing ==
Station service legend
Stops all times	Stops 24 hours a day
Stops all times except late nights	Stops every day during daytime hours only
Stops late nights only	Stops every day during overnight hours only
Stops weekdays during the day	Stops during weekday daytime hours only
Stops weekends and weekday evenings	Stops during weekend daytime and weekday evening hours
Stops rush hours in the peak direction only	Stops during weekday rush hours in the peak direction only
Time period details
Disabled access	Station is compliant with the Americans with Disabilities Act
↑	Station is compliant with the Americans with Disabilities Act in the indicated direction only
↓	Station is compliant with the Americans with Disabilities Act in the indicated direction only
	Elevator access to mezzanine only

Neighborhood (approximate)	Disabled access	Station	Tracks	Services	Opened	Transfers and notes
Manhattan
Branch from the IND 63rd Street Line (F M )
Midtown Manhattan	Disabled access	57th Street	2	F M	July 1, 1968	
Midtown Manhattan	Express Tracks split from the IND Eighth Avenue Line (B D )					
Midtown Manhattan		Seventh Avenue	express	B D	August 19, 1933	IND Queens Boulevard Line (E )
Midtown Manhattan	Local Tracks split from the IND Queens Boulevard Line (F <F>)					
Midtown Manhattan	Branch line merges (F M )					
Midtown Manhattan	Main line (B D F <F> M )					
Midtown Manhattan	Disabled access	47th–50th Streets–Rockefeller Center	all	B D F <F> M	December 15, 1940	
Midtown Manhattan	Elevator access to mezzanine only	42nd Street–Bryant Park	all	B D F <F> M	December 15, 1940	IRT Flushing Line (7 <7>) at Fifth Avenue; IRT Broadway–Seventh Avenue Line (1 2 3 ) at Times Square–42nd Street, daytime only BMT Broadway Line (N Q R W ) at Times Square–42nd Street, daytime only 42nd Street Shuttle (S ) at Times Square, daytime only IND Eighth Avenue Line (A C E ) at 42nd Street–Port Authority Bus Terminal, daytime only
Midtown Manhattan	Disabled access	34th Street–Herald Square	all	B D F <F> M	December 15, 1940	BMT Broadway Line (N Q R W ) Penn Station: Amtrak, Long Island Rail Road, and New Jersey Transit; M34/M34A Select Bus Service; Connection to PATH at 33rd Street
Chelsea		23rd Street	local	F <F> M	December 15, 1940	M23 Select Bus Service; Connection to PATH at 23rd Street
Greenwich Village	↑	14th Street	local	F <F> M	December 15, 1940	BMT Canarsie Line (L ) IRT Broadway–Seventh Avenue Line (1 2 3 ) Connection to PATH at 14th Street; M14A/M14D Select Bus Service; Station is ADA-accessible in the northbound direction only.
Greenwich Village	Disabled access	West Fourth Street–Washington Square	all	B D F <F> M	December 15, 1940	IND Eighth Avenue Line (A C E )
Local crossovers to/from the IND Eighth Avenue Line (no regular service)
NoHo	Disabled access	Broadway–Lafayette Street	all	B D F <F> M	January 1, 1936	IRT Lexington Avenue Line (4 6 <6> ) at Bleecker Street
Express tracks turn under Chrystie Street (B D )
Local tracks split to the BMT Nassau Street Line (M ) and also continue under Houston Street (F <F>)
Branch under Chrystie Street (B D )
Chinatown		Grand Street	express	B D	November 27, 1967	
To north tracks of Manhattan Bridge
Branch under Houston Street (F <F>)
East Village		Second Avenue	local layup tracks	F <F>	January 1, 1936	M15 Select Bus Service
Lower East Side		Delancey Street	local	F <F>	January 1, 1936	BMT Nassau Street Line (J M Z) at Essex Street
Lower East Side		East Broadway	local	F <F>	January 1, 1936	
Brooklyn
Rutgers Street Tunnel under the East River
DUMBO		York Street	local	F <F>	April 9, 1936	
Continues as the IND Culver Line (F <F>)
