= East Broadway station =

New York City Subway station in Manhattan

East Broadway
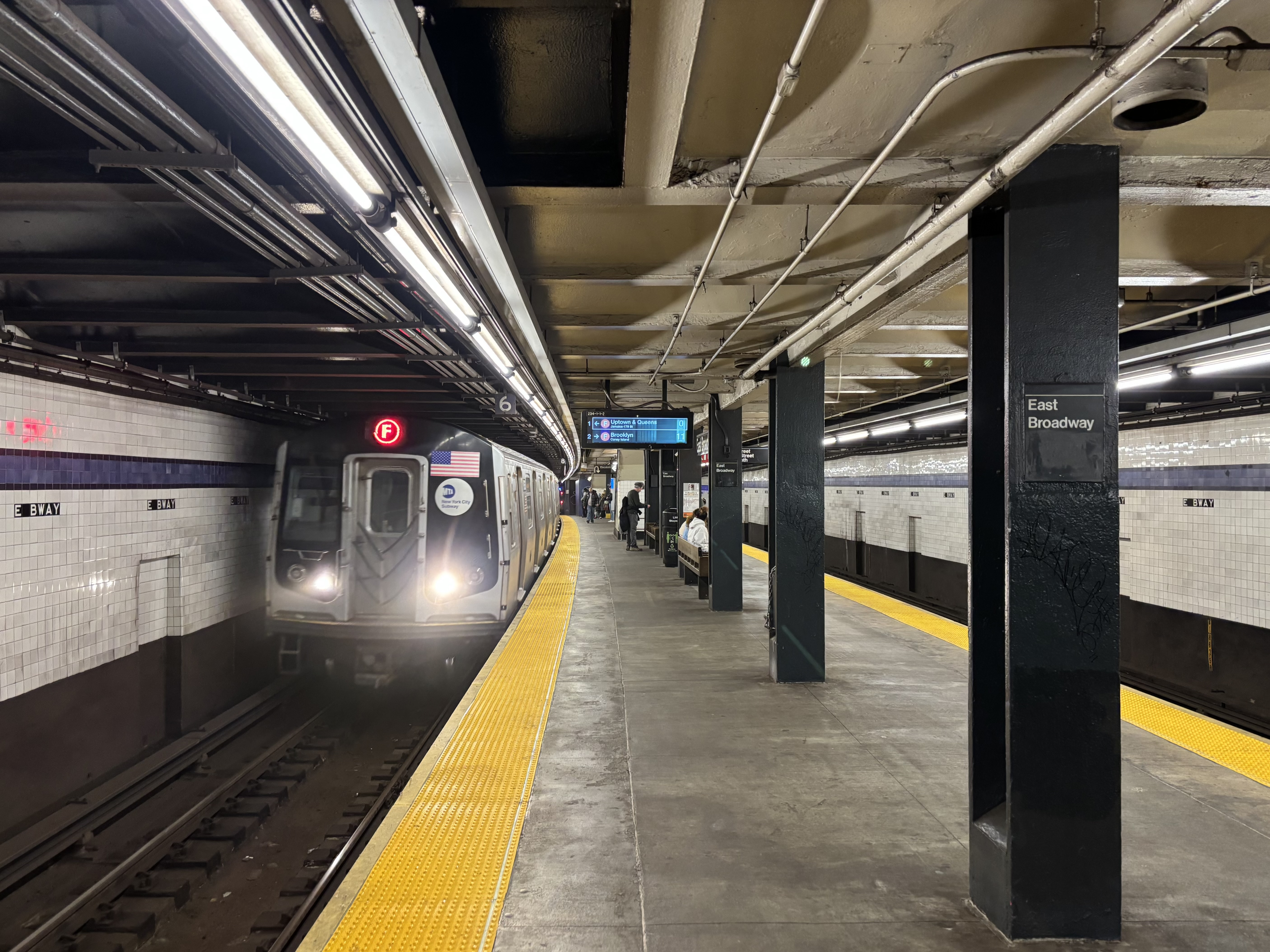
- Northbound R160 F train arriving

Station statistics
- Address: East Broadway & Rutgers Street; New York, New York
- Borough: Manhattan
- Locale: Lower East Side
- Coordinates: 40.714216°N 73.990259°W
- Division: B (IND)
- Line: IND Sixth Avenue Line
- Services: F (all times) <F> (two rush hour trains, peak direction)
- Transit: NYCT Bus: M9, M22
- Structure: Underground
- Platforms: 1 island platform
- Tracks: 2

Other information
- Opened: January 1, 1936; 90 years ago
- Accessible: No; planned

Traffic
- 2025: 3,823,875 ▲6.1%
- Rank: 93 out of 423
Services
Preceding station	New York City Subway	Following station
Delancey Street F <F> toward Jamaica–179th Street	Local	York Street F <F> toward Coney Island–Stillwell Avenue
Location
Location within New York City Subway
Location within New York City
Location within New York
Track layout
Street map
Station service legend
Symbol	Description
Stops all times	Stops all times
Stops rush hours in the peak direction only (limited service)	Stops rush hours in the peak direction only (limited service)

The East Broadway station is a station on the IND Sixth Avenue Line of the New York City Subway. Located at East Broadway and Rutgers Street on the Lower East Side, it is served by the F train at all times and the <F> train during rush hours in the peak direction.

The East Broadway station was built for the Independent Subway System (IND)'s Sixth Avenue Line and opened on January 1, 1936. It contains one island platform and two tracks. The station was initially intended as an interchange station with the Worth Street Line underneath East Broadway, to be built as part of the IND Second System, although the other line was not completed. As a result, the station contains several mezzanines, one of which was originally intended as the platform level of the Worth Street Line. The station has exits to Rutgers Street's intersections with East Broadway and with Madison Street.

== History ==
=== Construction and opening ===
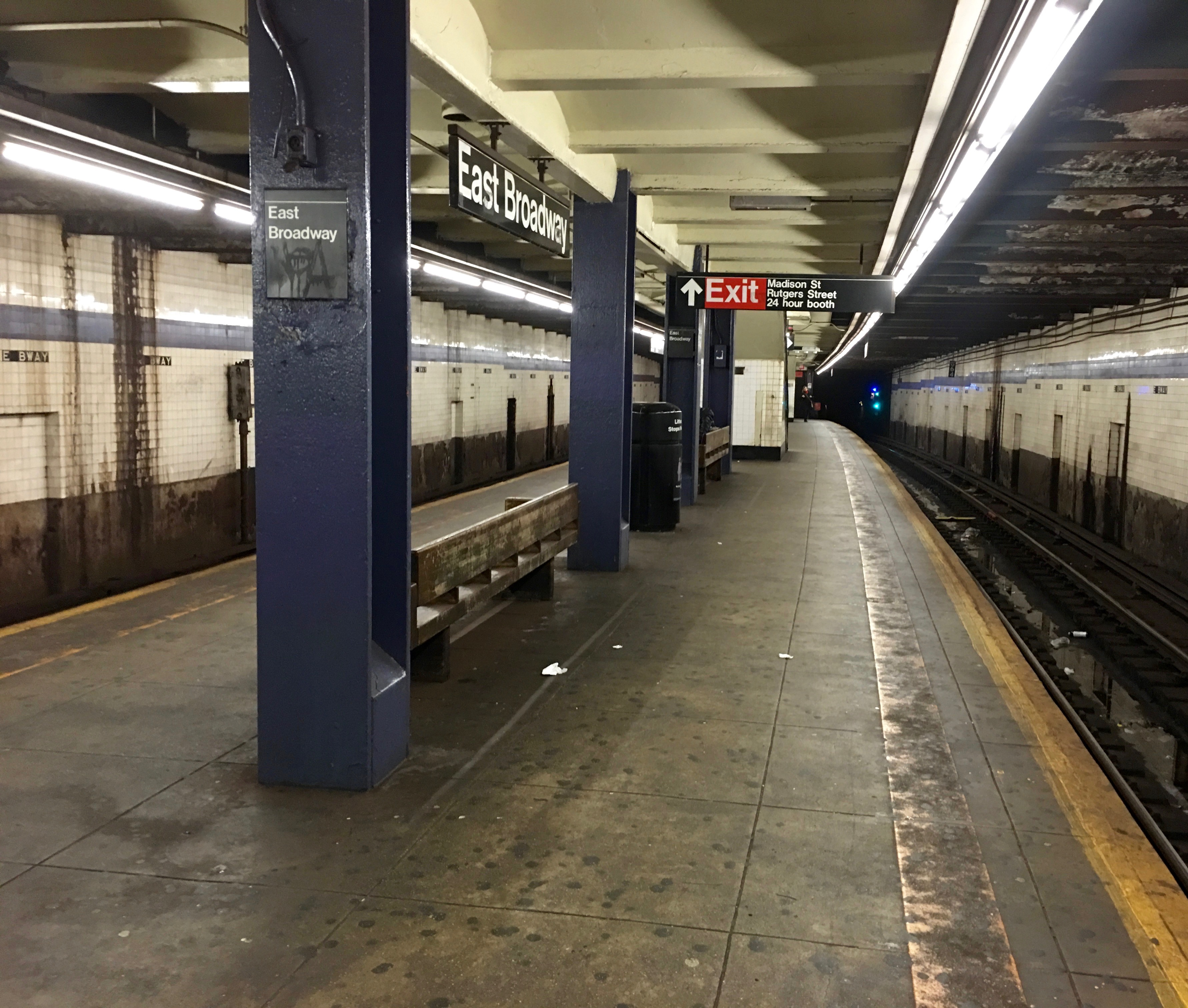
Station prior to renovation

New York City mayor John Francis Hylan's original plans for the Independent Subway System (IND), proposed in 1922, included building over 100 miles (160 km) of new lines and taking over nearly 100 miles (160 km) of existing lines, which would compete with the IRT and the Brooklyn–Manhattan Transit Corporation (BMT), the two major subway operators of the time. The IND Sixth Avenue Line was designed to replace the elevated IRT Sixth Avenue Line. The first portion of the line to be constructed was then known as the Houston–Essex Street Line, which ran under Houston, Essex, and Rutgers Streets. The contract for the line was awarded to Corson Construction in January 1929, and construction of this section officially started in May 1929.

The East Broadway station opened on January 1, 1936, as the southern terminus of the first four stations to open on the Sixth Avenue Line. Two local tracks split from a junction with the Eighth Avenue Line south of West Fourth Street–Washington Square, running east under Houston Street and south under Essex Street to a temporary terminal at East Broadway. The station was initially served by E trains to Church Avenue. Just after midnight on April 9, 1936, trains began running under the East River via the Rutgers Street Tunnel, which connected the Houston-Essex Street Line with the north end of the Culver Line at a junction with the Eighth Avenue Line north of Jay Street–Borough Hall. E trains were sent through the connection to Church Avenue. When further sections of the Sixth Avenue Line opened on December 15, 1940, the F train replaced the E train at the East Broadway station.

=== Station renovation ===
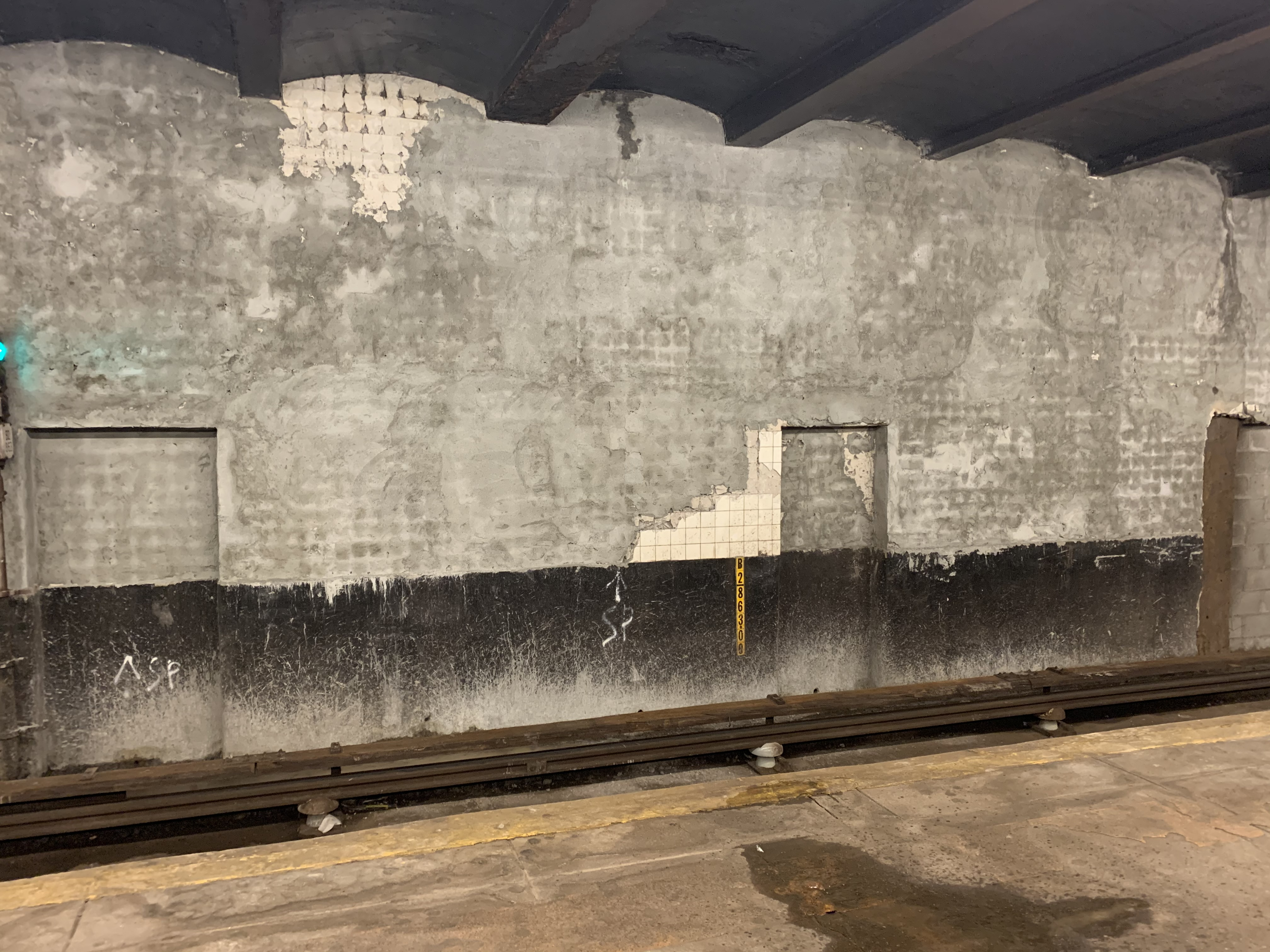
Station during renovation

In June 2018, improvements to the East Broadway station's exits were proposed as part of the development of the 247 Cherry, 269 South Street, and 259 Clinton Street skyscrapers. The developers planned to create an entrance at the northeastern corner of Rutgers and Madison Streets by reusing part of the existing closed exit and creating a new street stair parallel to Madison Street from the passage. In addition to a new exit, the developers planned to make the station compliant with the Americans with Disabilities Act of 1990 with the installation of elevators. The plan was approved that December.

The Rutgers Street Tunnel was refurbished starting in late 2020. As part of the work, the East Broadway station's structural system was repaired and painted, while the platform edges, wall tiles, and stairs were replaced. Work was completed in February 2021. In 2026, the MTA began experimenting with a radiant cooling system, in which chilled water circulates through pipes to cool the surrounding air, at the East Broadway station.

== Station layout ==
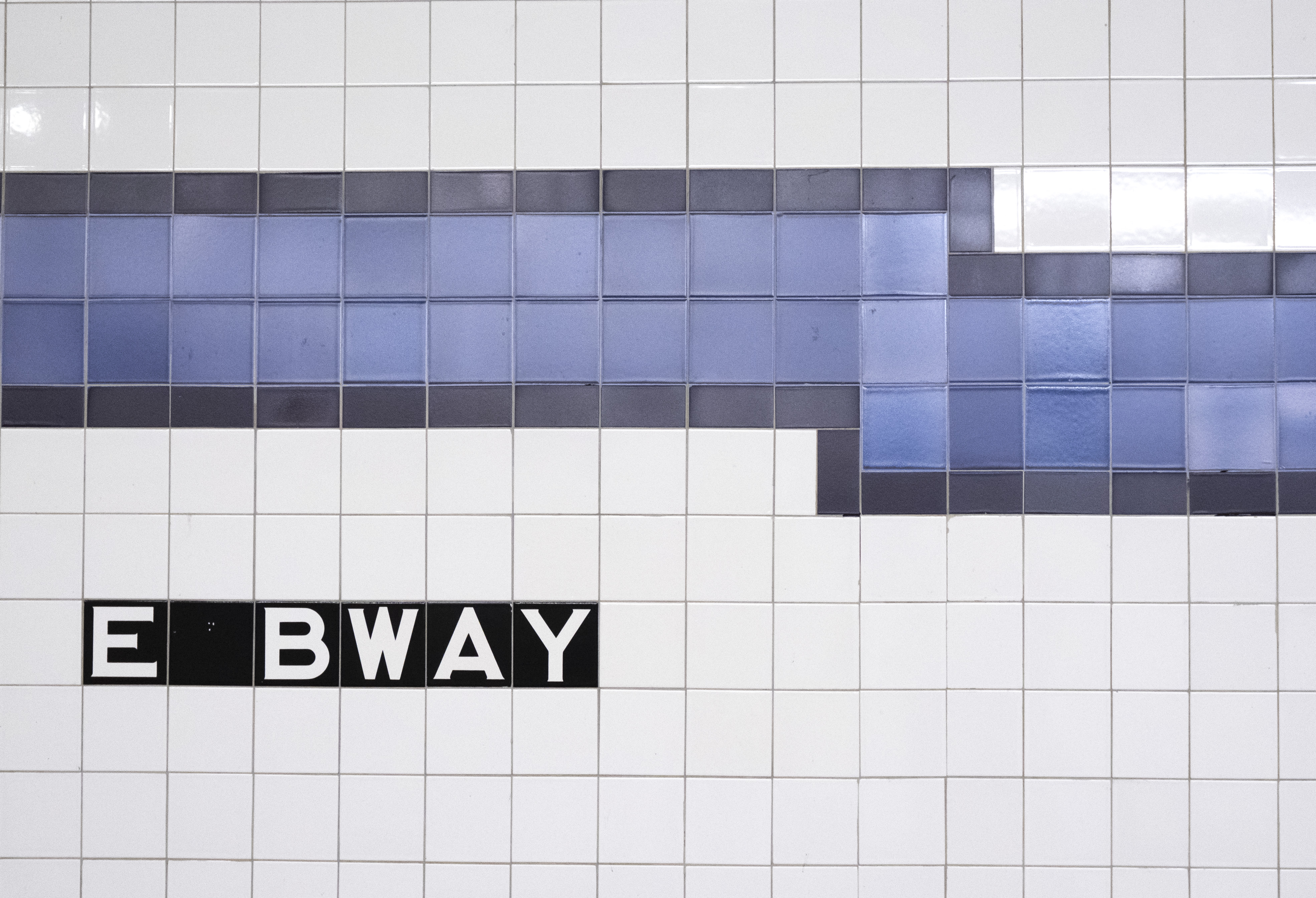
Renovated trim line and tile caption, mostly faithful to original

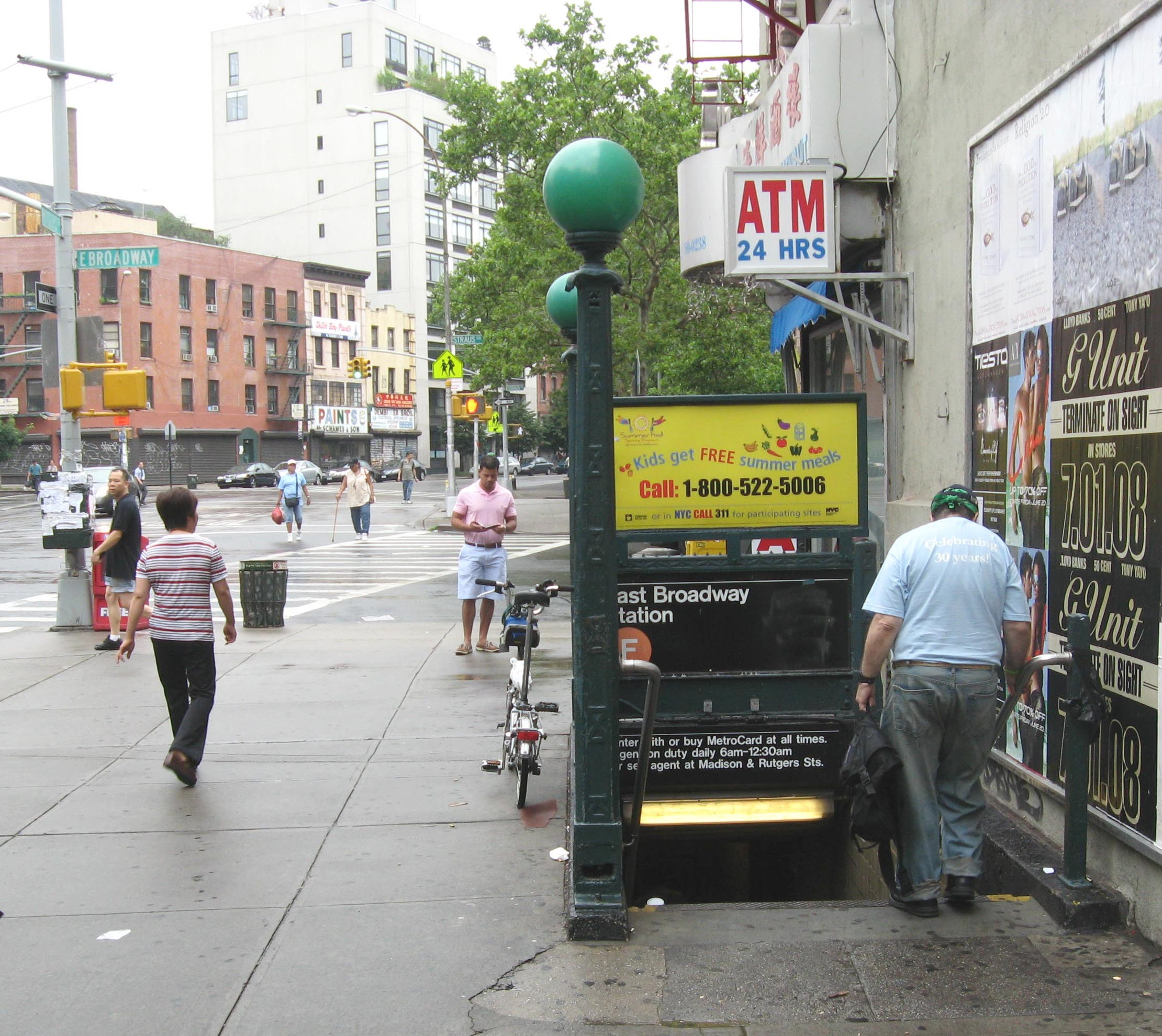
Stair at southeast corner of East Broadway and Rutgers Street

The station has two tracks and one narrow, slightly curved island platform. There is an abandoned tower at the north end of the platform. The F stops here at all times and is between Delancey Street to the north and York Street in Brooklyn to the south.

The tile band is medium Parma violet with a slightly darker border, set two tiles high. Tile captions below show the station name abbreviated as "E BWAY" in white letters on black. The I-beam columns are painted a similar shade of dark violet. The trackside walls showed a considerable pattern of aging and occasional water damage prior to the station's renovation, which replaced all the tiles and remained mostly faithful to the original design.

The 1992 artwork at this station is called Displacing Details by Noel Copeland, with assistance by students from the Henry Street Settlement.

There are many closed sections at East Broadway, including restrooms that have been converted to office spaces. Inside fare control, the open intermediate level's mezzanine is split into two halves; the portion between the two halves was shuttered and is now used as maintenance space. Right below the open intermediate level is an entire closed intermediate level mezzanine, which is indicated by a brief intermediate level on staircases from the open mezzanine to the platform and now serves as storage space as well. This closed mezzanine is accessible through fenced-off stairways at the either end of the station.

=== Unfinished station ===
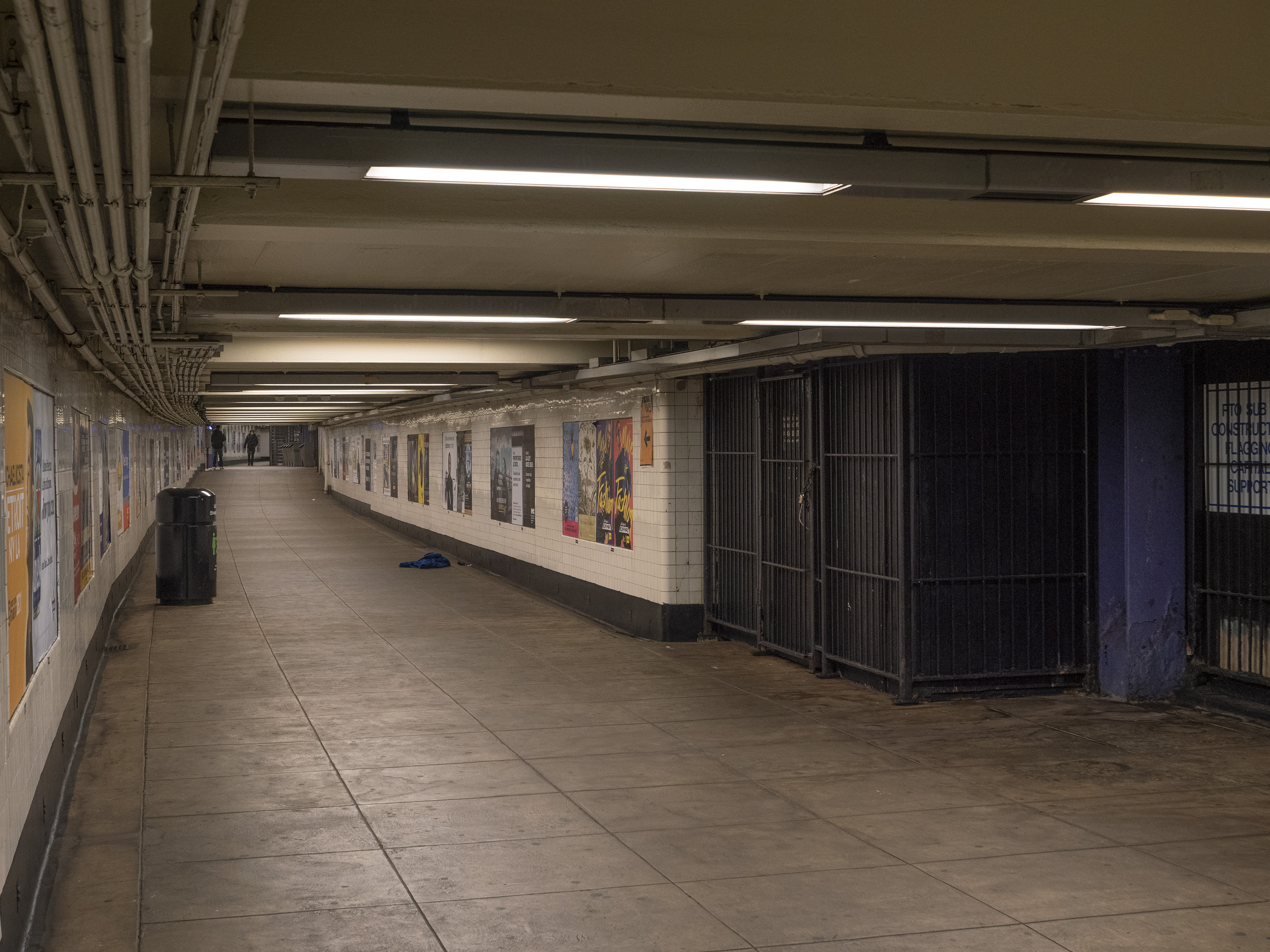
Station mezzanine

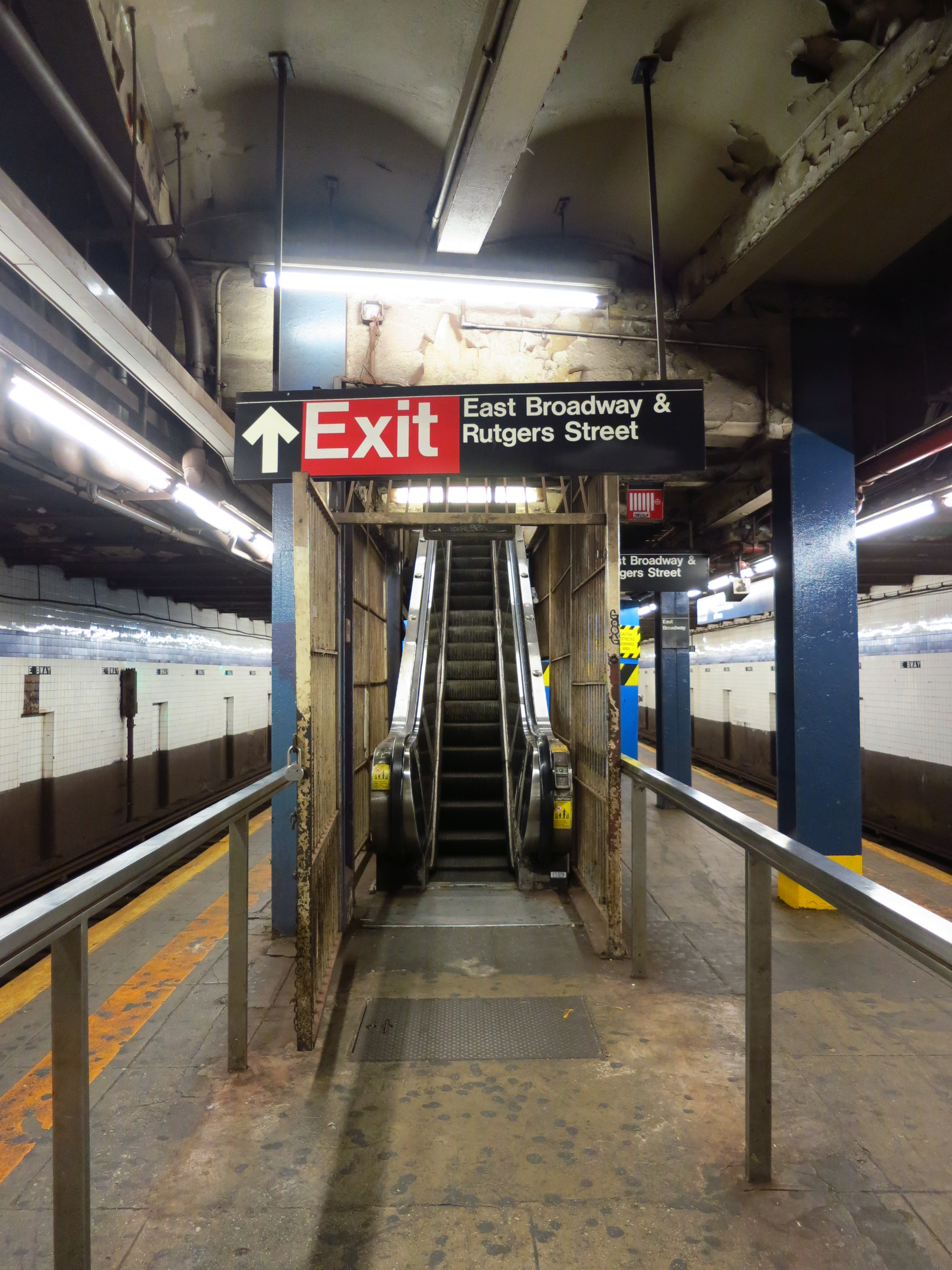
Escalator

The north half of the open intermediate level mezzanine was designed to eventually become a station of the unbuilt IND Worth Street Line. A locked door, located in the north end of the mezzanine, reveals additional closed platform space and an electrical room that hides the rest of the trackway and platform space. In this closed space, the platform floor drops to the level of the intended westbound trackway for the unbuilt line.

The unused space runs for no more than 15 feet (4.6 m) before ending at a solid wall. Another door that leads to the electrical room hides the eastbound trackway. Near the north end of this station, a different ceiling structure angling across marks where the unbuilt subway would have gone. The ramp that descends from the full-time side would have led to the same intermediate level, with a station facility in between, but that was never constructed. On the open intermediate level's mezzanine, the unusual spacing of some of the pillars marks where the line's platforms would have been placed.

=== Exits ===
The station has two mezzanines, four open staircases, three closed staircases, and one escalator. The full-time entrance at Madison Street has one street staircase, while the part-time entrance at Canal and Rutgers Streets has three. A passageway outside of fare control connects the two areas.

All exits to the station are street stairs. There is an exit to the northeastern corner of Canal Street and Essex Street, the western side of Rutgers Street between Canal Street and East Broadway, to the southeastern corner of East Broadway and Rutgers Street, and to the northwestern corner of Madison Street and Rutgers Street.

In addition to the open entrances, there are two closed exits to the southwestern and northeastern corners of Henry Street and Rutgers Street that lead to the middle of the passageway outside fare control. There was also a short passage with a street stair parallel to Rutgers Street to the northeastern corner of Madison Street and Rutgers Street.
