= York Street station (IND Sixth Avenue Line) =

New York City Subway station in Brooklyn

York Street
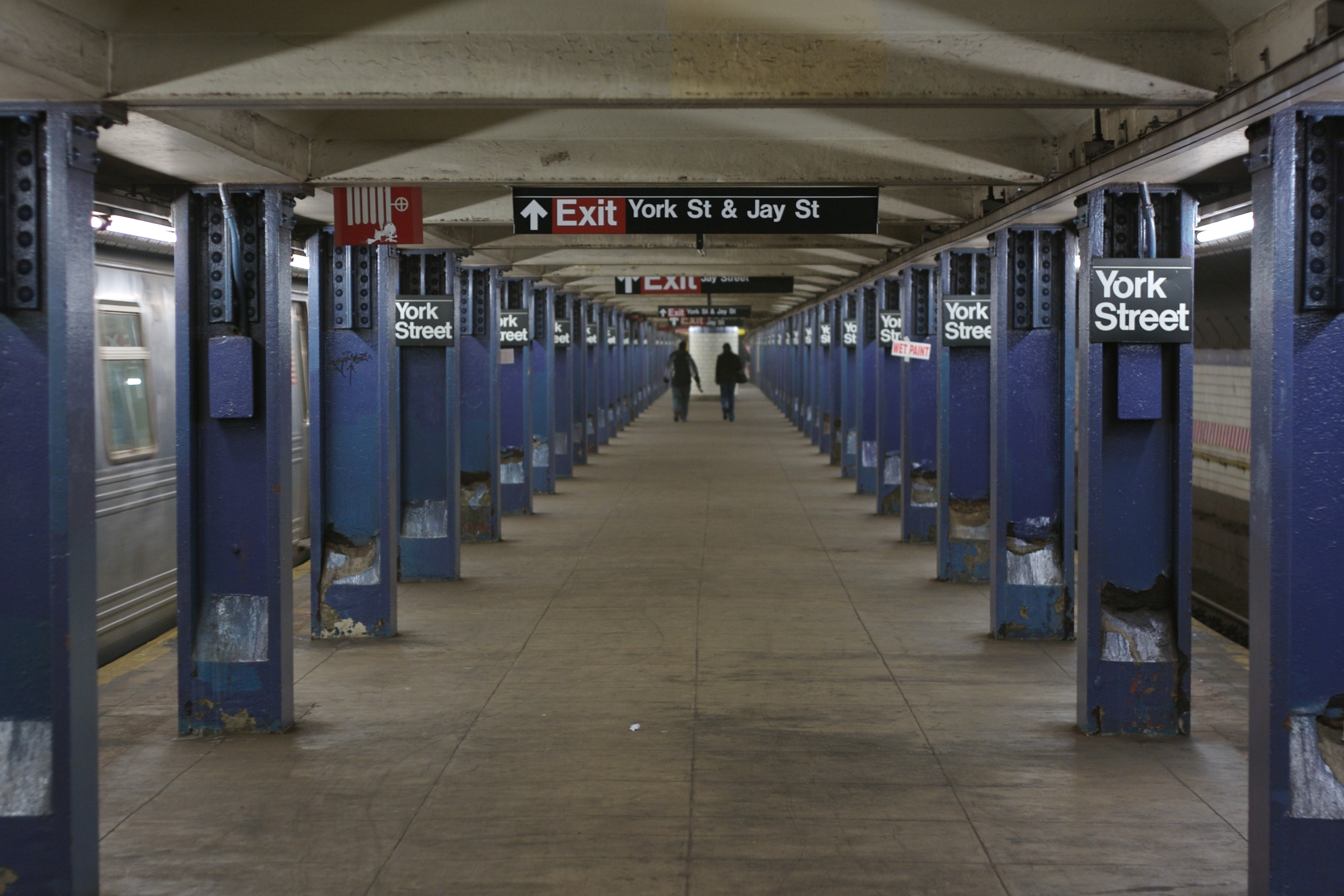
- Station platform

Station statistics
- Address: York Street & Jay Street; Brooklyn, New York
- Borough: Brooklyn
- Locale: Dumbo, Downtown Brooklyn
- Coordinates: 40.701529°N 73.986783°W
- Division: B (IND)
- Line: IND Sixth Avenue Line
- Services: F (all times) <F> (two rush hour trains, peak direction)
- Transit: NYCT Bus: B25, B67, B69; NYC Ferry: East River, South Brooklyn (BBP Pier 1)
- Structure: Underground
- Platforms: 1 island platform
- Tracks: 2

Other information
- Opened: April 9, 1936; 90 years ago

Traffic
- 2025: 3,872,644 ▲8.1%
- Rank: 90 out of 423
Services
| Preceding station | New York City Subway | Following station |
|---|---|---|
| East Broadway F <F> toward Jamaica–179th Street | Local | Jay Street–MetroTech F <F> toward Coney Island–Stillwell Avenue |
Location
Location within New York City Subway
Location within New York City
Location within New York
Track layout
Street map
Station service legend
| Symbol | Description |
| Stops all times | Stops all times |
| Stops rush hours in the peak direction only (limited service) | Stops rush hours in the peak direction only (limited service) |

The York Street station is a station on the IND Sixth Avenue Line of the New York City Subway. It is served by the F train at all times and the <F> train during rush hours in the peak direction. It is located at York Street and Jay Street in Dumbo.

== History ==
=== Background ===
More than 50 years before the construction of the IND Sixth Avenue Line, the intersection of York and Jay Streets was between two stations on the original BMT Lexington Avenue Line. West of the intersection was York and Washington Streets station, which had a connection to the Brooklyn Bridge via the New York and Brooklyn Bridge Railway. One block east of the station was the Bridge Street station. The line and the two stations ran west to east, were built by Brooklyn Elevated Railroad on May 13, 1885 and closed by Brooklyn Rapid Transit on April 11, 1904.

=== Construction and opening ===
New York City mayor John Francis Hylan's original plans for the Independent Subway System (IND), proposed in 1922, included building over 100 miles (160 km) of new lines and taking over nearly 100 miles (160 km) of existing lines, which would compete with the IRT and the Brooklyn–Manhattan Transit Corporation (BMT), the two major subway operators of the time. The IND Sixth Avenue Line was designed to replace the elevated IRT Sixth Avenue Line. The first portion of the line to be constructed was then known as the Houston–Essex Street Line, which ran under Houston, Essex, and Rutgers Streets. The contract for the line was awarded to Corson Construction in January 1929, and construction of this section officially started in May 1929.

The York Street station opened just after midnight on April 9, 1936, when trains began running under the East River via the Rutgers Street Tunnel, which connected the existing portion of the Sixth Avenue Line to a junction with the Eighth Avenue Line north of Jay Street–Borough Hall. The station was initially served by E trains to Church Avenue. When further sections of the Sixth Avenue Line opened on December 15, 1940, the F train replaced the E train.

== Station layout ==
This underground, deep-level station has two tracks and one narrow island platform. The F stops here at all times and is between East Broadway in Manhattan to the north and Jay Street–MetroTech to the south.

Located at the southern end of the Rutgers Street Tunnel, it has round deep-bore walls with matte-finish white brick tiling and purple tile border. The station is about 80 feet (24 m) deep. The platform contains six large circular piers supporting the Manhattan Bridge, which contain white-brick tiling. The standard I-beam columns are painted blue with alternating ones having black name plates in white lettering. The columns are largely 15 feet (4.6 m) apart, except at two locations where they are 17.5 feet (5.3 m) apart.

To the north of the station, the Sixth Avenue Line continues via the Rutgers Street Tunnel to Manhattan; to the south, it converges with the IND Eighth Avenue Line and ends north of Jay Street. The Sixth Avenue Line tracks continue south as the IND Culver Line.

=== Exit ===
==== Northern exit ====
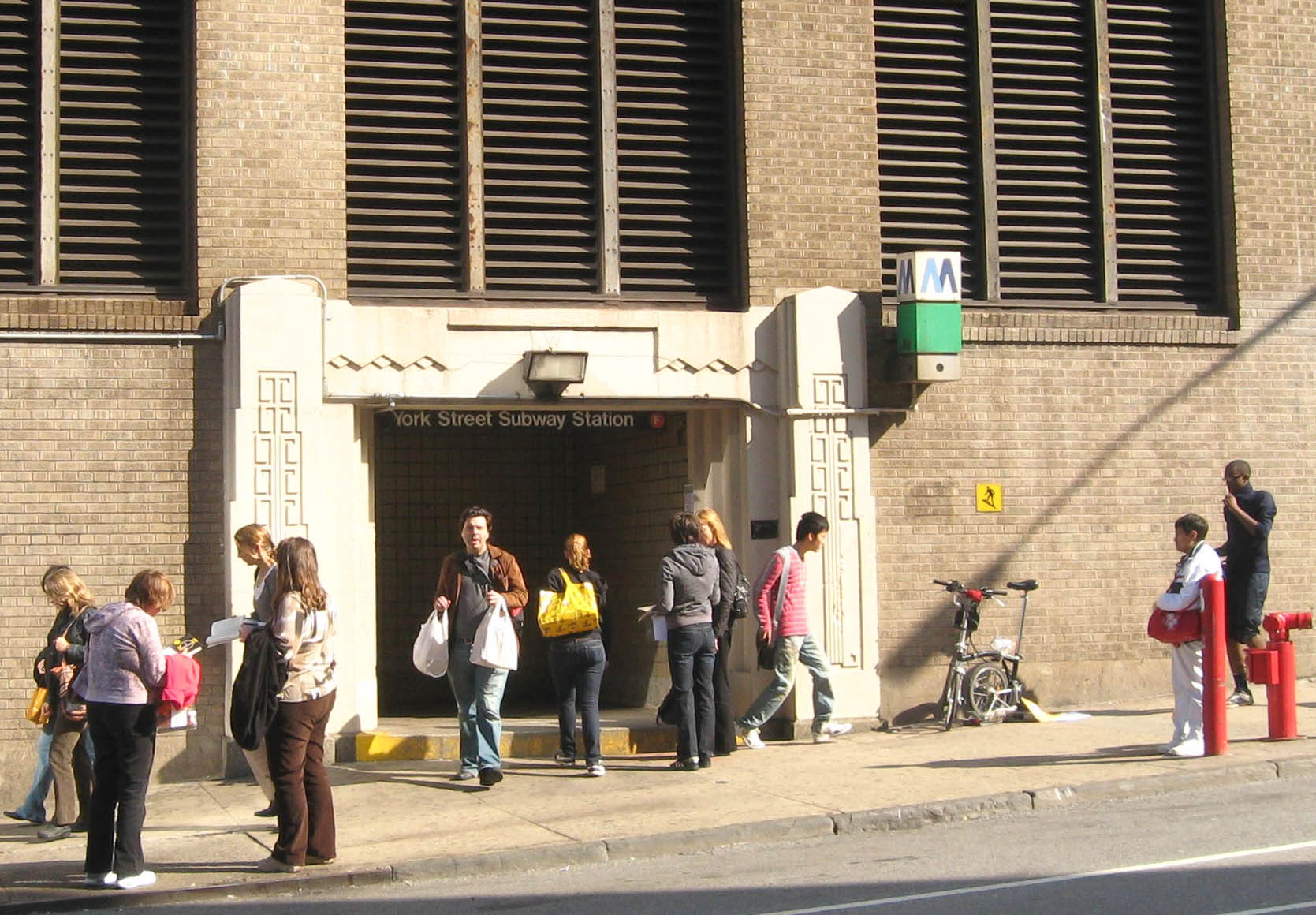
Street entrance

The only exit, located at the station's north end, leads to the Rutgers Street tunnel ventilation tower at the intersection of York Street and Jay Street. It has a turnstile bank and long passageway and staircase to the platform.

==== Proposed southern exit ====
In the original design of the station, a mezzanine was proposed at the station's south end, with an unbuilt entrance leading to the intersection of High Street and Jay Street. The lack of a second entrance created dangerous conditions. For example, when the northern exit was obscured by smoke during a fire in 2003, several commuters were hospitalized because they were mistakenly diverted to the south end of the platform. In 2016, Delson or Sherman Architects (now independently operating as Sherman Architects and Studio Delson) proposed a new accessible entrance at the south end of the York Street station.

The MTA completed a feasibility study for a new entrance in 2022, following complaints from local residents and politicians who said the single entrance posed a safety hazard. The study found that both options for a new southern entrance would be prohibitively expensive because of the complex infrastructure around the site. A full stair and elevator entrance would cost $420–450 million, while an entrance containing only an elevator would cost $230–260 million. In both cases, a new mezzanine would need to be constructed. At the time, the MTA was expected to receive $7 million for station improvements from the developer of a nearby building.

== Points of interest ==
- Dumbo Tech Triangle
- Farragut Houses
- Brooklyn Navy Yard
- Commandant's House at Brooklyn Navy Yard
