= 247 Cherry =

Proposed residential skyscraper in Manhattan, New York

- Interactive map of the 247 Cherry area

General information
- Status: Proposed
- Type: Residential
- Coordinates: 40.7111°N 73.9902°W
- Construction started: 2026

Height
- Roof: 309 m (1,014 ft)

Technical details
- Floor count: 79

Design and construction
- Architect: SHoP Architects

247 Cherry is a 79-story residential building under development on the Lower East Side of Manhattan, New York City. The building was designed by SHoP Architects, and is being developed by JDS Development Group. Renderings for the building were first released in April 2016. The building will be adjacent to One Manhattan Square. 247 Cherry will be developed in conjunction with two other nearby skyscrapers: 269 South Street and 259 Clinton Street.

Development of the building was halted in July 2016 due to a lawsuit pertaining to a site adjacent the structure. In July 2018, the developers released a new plan that would also contain several improvements to the surrounding area, including a new entrance to the New York City Subway's East Broadway station, connections between Clinton Street and the East River, renovations of nearby playgrounds, and flood-resistance upgrades. The city's Planning Commission also scheduled a vote on the project. Although politicians and grassroots organizations opposed the project, the City Planning Commission approved it in December 2018. The developments were temporarily blocked by a New York Supreme Court judge in late February 2020, but then unblocked by a full New York Supreme Court panel of judges in August 2020, and their decision in favor of the development was then upheld by the New York Court of Appeals in April 2021.
