= Delancey Street/Essex Street station =

New York City Subway station in Manhattan

Delancey Street/Essex Street
- New York City Subway station complex
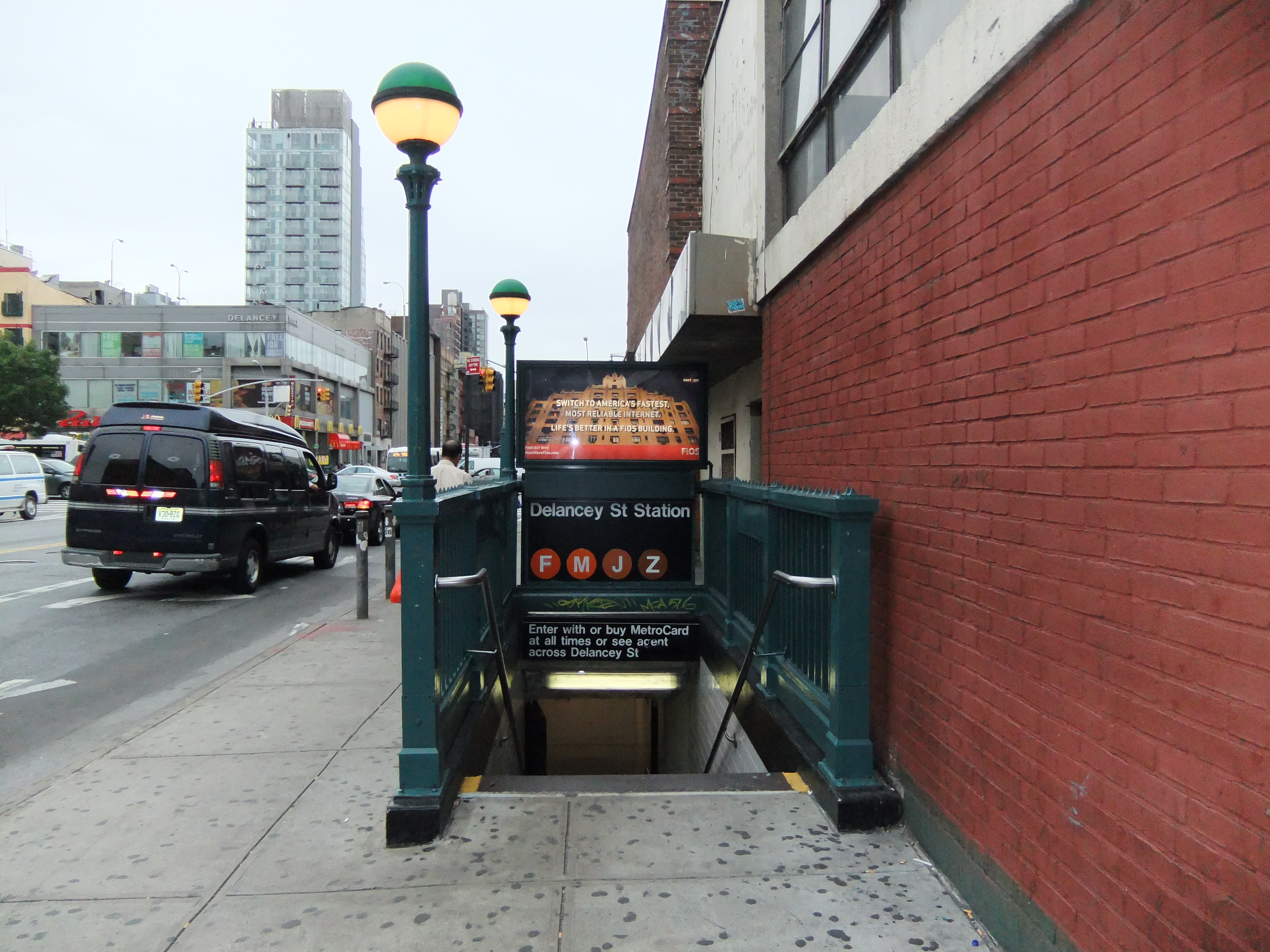
- Stair at southeast corner of Essex and Delancey

Station statistics
- Address: Delancey Street and Essex Street; New York, New York
- Borough: Manhattan
- Locale: Lower East Side
- Coordinates: 40.71851°N 73.988199°W
- Division: B (BMT/IND)
- Line: IND Sixth Avenue Line; BMT Nassau Street Line
- Services: F (all times) <F> (two rush hour trains, peak direction); J (all times); M (all times except late nights); Z (rush hours, peak direction)
- Transit: NYCT Bus: M9, M14A SBS (announced as M14 SBS on trains), B39
- Structure: Underground
- Levels: 2

Other information
- Opened: July 1, 1948; 78 years ago
- Accessible: No; planned

Traffic
- 2025: 7,776,499 ▲9.8%
- Rank: 27 out of 423
Location
Location within New York City Subway
Location within New York City
Location within New York
Street map
Station service legend
| Symbol | Description |
| Stops all times | Stops all times |
| Stops all times except late nights | Stops all times except late nights |
| Stops rush hours in the peak direction only | Stops rush hours in the peak direction only |

The Delancey Street/Essex Street station is a station complex shared by the BMT Nassau Street Line and the IND Sixth Avenue Lines of the New York City Subway, located at the intersection of Essex and Delancey Streets on the Lower East Side of Manhattan, just west of the Williamsburg Bridge. It is served by the F and J trains at all times, the M train at all times except late nights, and during rush hours, the Z skip-stop train in the peak direction and the <F> train in the peak direction. It is the western terminus for weekend M trains.

In addition to the two track levels—the BMT platforms are on the upper level, and the IND platforms are on the lower—an intermediate mezzanine built for the IND platforms provides the passenger connection between the two lines. As the BMT and the IND were originally separate systems, the transfer passageway was not within fare control until July 1, 1948. The full-time entrance is on the north side of Delancey Street, on either side of Essex Street.

== Station layout ==
Since June 2010, both the F and the M operate local along the Sixth Avenue Line north of the Delancey Street/Essex Street station. This resulted in many riders waiting in the stairwells connecting the Sixth Avenue Line's lower-level northbound platform, where the F stops, and the Nassau Street Line's upper-level southbound platform, where the M stops before merging onto the Sixth Avenue Line northbound. This phenomenon did not occur in other stations where two services have separate platforms before merging into the same direction, such as 50th Street–Eighth Avenue. In 2017, the MTA installed train-arrival "countdown clocks" across the New York City Subway system, which show how much time will elapse until the next train arrives on each respective platform.

The MTA announced in 2019 that the Delancey Street/Essex Street station would become ADA-accessible as part of the agency's 2020–2024 Capital Program. The accessibility project was to be funded by congestion pricing in New York City, but it was postponed in June 2024 after the implementation of congestion pricing was delayed. In April 2025, the state government announced that, as part of the construction of a housing development on the site of the former Essex Street Market, elevators would be installed at the station. These will include an elevator entrance from the northeast corner of Essex and Delancey Streets, as well as three elevators within fare control. Also in April 2025, the MTA announced plans to install taller fare gates with glass panels at 20 stations, including the Delancey Street/Essex Street station. The fare gates would be manufactured by Cubic Transportation Systems, Conduent, Scheidt & Bachmann, and STraffic as part of a pilot program to reduce fare evasion.

=== Exits ===
| Exit location | Number of exits |
|---|---|
| NW corner of Delancey Street and Essex Street | 1 stair |
| SW corner of Delancey Street and Essex Street | 1 stair |
| NE corner of Delancey Street and Essex Street | 1 stair 1 HEET |
| SE corner of Delancey Street and Essex Street | 1 stair 1 HEET |
| NW corner of Delancey Street and Norfolk Street | 1 stair |
| NE corner of Delancey Street and Norfolk Street | 1 stair |

Both the IND and the BMT stations have additional closed exits. The IND station had four additional exits; two were at both the north end of the station at Rivington Street and the other two were at the south end at Broome Street. Two of the staircases were sealed on street level, but metal trapdoors block the other two. A former exit to the southeastern corner of Rivington Street and Essex Street, adjacent to the rear of the Essex Street Market building, remains as a northern emergency exit, and a former exit to the southeastern corner of Broome Street and Essex Street similarly remains as a southern emergency exit.

As part of the construction of the nearby Essex Crossing development, Site 9, which is located at 120 Essex Street (between Rivington and Delancey Streets), there is an easement for a future elevator entrance.

== BMT Nassau Street Line platforms ==
Essex Street
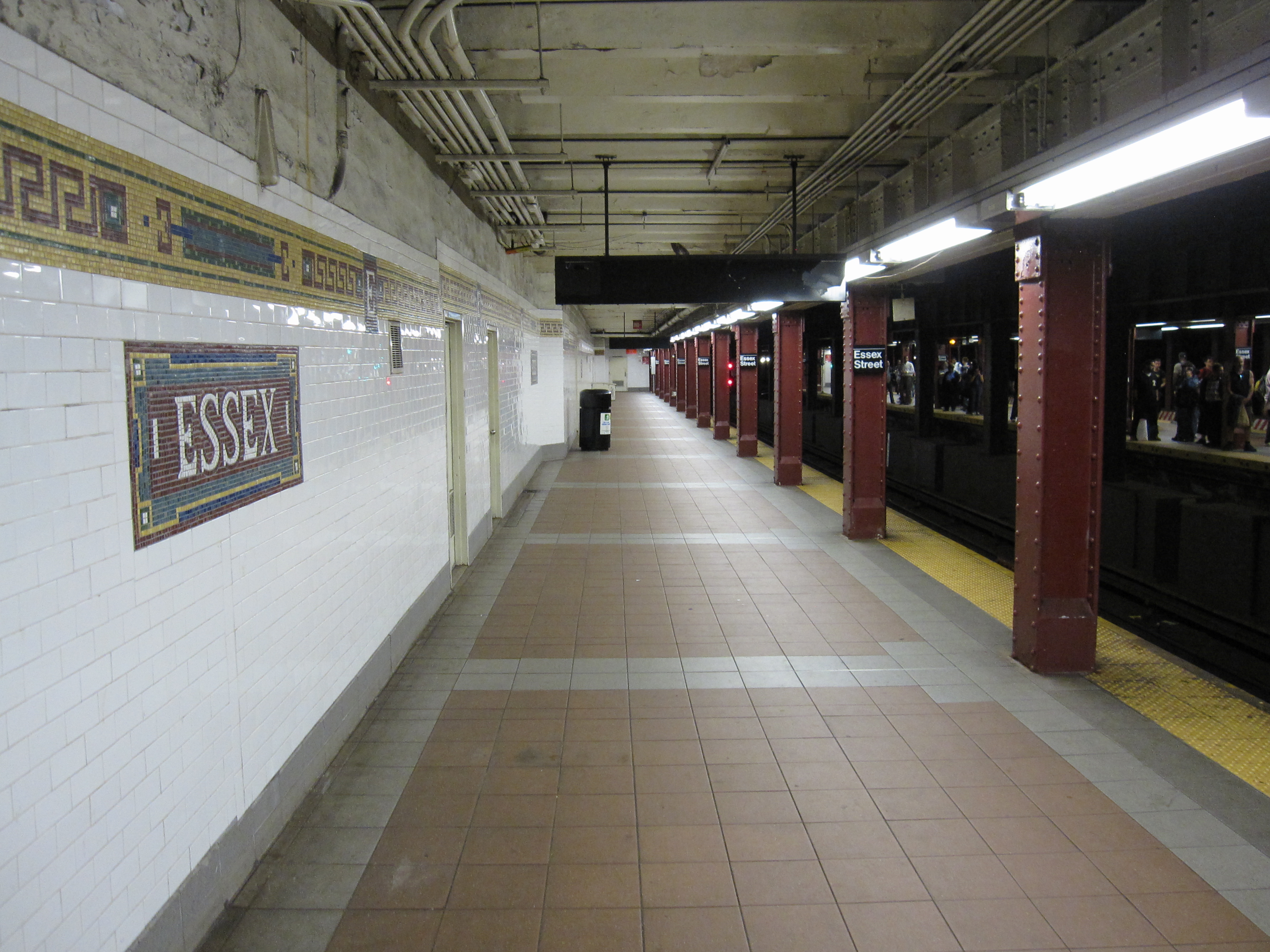
- Westbound platform

Station statistics
- Division: B (BMT)
- Line: BMT Nassau Street Line
- Services: J (all times); M (all times except late nights); Z (rush hours, peak direction)
- Platforms: 1 island platform cross-platform interchange (eastbound only); 1 side platform
- Tracks: 3

Other information
- Opened: September 16, 1908; 118 years ago
- Accessible: No; planned
- Former/other names: Delancey Street
Services
| Preceding station | New York City Subway | Following station |
|---|---|---|
| Bowery J Z toward Broad Street | J/Z (New York City Subway service) | Marcy Avenue J M Z eastbound |
| Broadway–Lafayette Street M toward Forest Hills–71st Avenue | Local | Marcy Avenue J M Z eastbound |
Track layout
Station service legend
| Symbol | Description |
| Stops all times | Stops all times |
| Stops all times except late nights | Stops all times except late nights |
| Stops weekends during the day | Stops weekends during the day |
| Stops weekdays during the day | Stops weekdays during the day |
| Stops rush hours in the peak direction only | Stops rush hours in the peak direction only |

The Essex Street station (announced as Delancey Street–Essex Street) is an interchange station on the BMT Nassau Street Line, and has three tracks, one side platform, and one island platform. The island platform, which consists of two tracks and allows for cross-platform interchange, is used by trains heading east toward the Williamsburg Bridge. The side platform, which consists of one track, is used by trains heading west from the bridge. The station is served by the J at all times, the M except at night and the Z only during rush hours in the peak direction. The next stop to the east is Marcy Avenue for all service heading towards Brooklyn and Queens. The next stop to the west is Bowery for J and Z trains heading downtown and Broadway–Lafayette Street for M trains heading uptown.

The middle track was formerly the peak-direction express track. Currently, it is used by outbound J and Z trains heading east towards the Williamsburg Bridge except on weekdays during the late evening and on weekends during the day, when it short turns M trains from Metropolitan Avenue.

After a 2004 reconfiguration, the former northbound local track south of this station was taken out of regular service. It was only used for occasional reroutes from Chambers Street until 2010. The Chrystie Street Connection between Broadway–Lafayette Street and Essex Street was not used for regular revenue service from 1976 to 2010. On June 28, 2010, with the re-routing of M trains to the IND Sixth Avenue Line and IND Queens Boulevard Line, the connection again saw regular use for those aforementioned trains only.

This station is a bottleneck for eastbound trains, which can be delayed momentarily at this station because the island platform’s two eastbound tracks merge into one upon leaving the station and before crossing the Williamsburg Bridge.

=== History ===
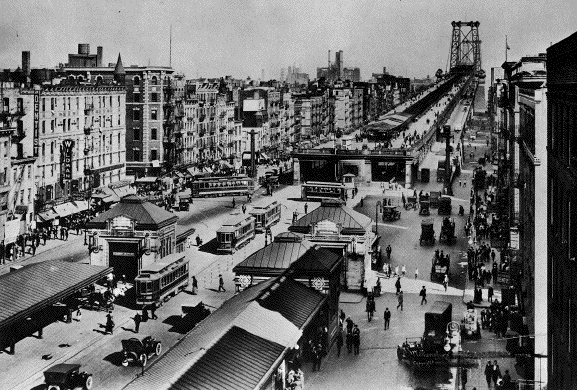
Williamsburg Bridge and Delancey Street, 1919. Kiosks in the center go down to the underground trolley terminal; larger one to the left goes to the subway. Foreground: waiting areas for Manhattan streetcars

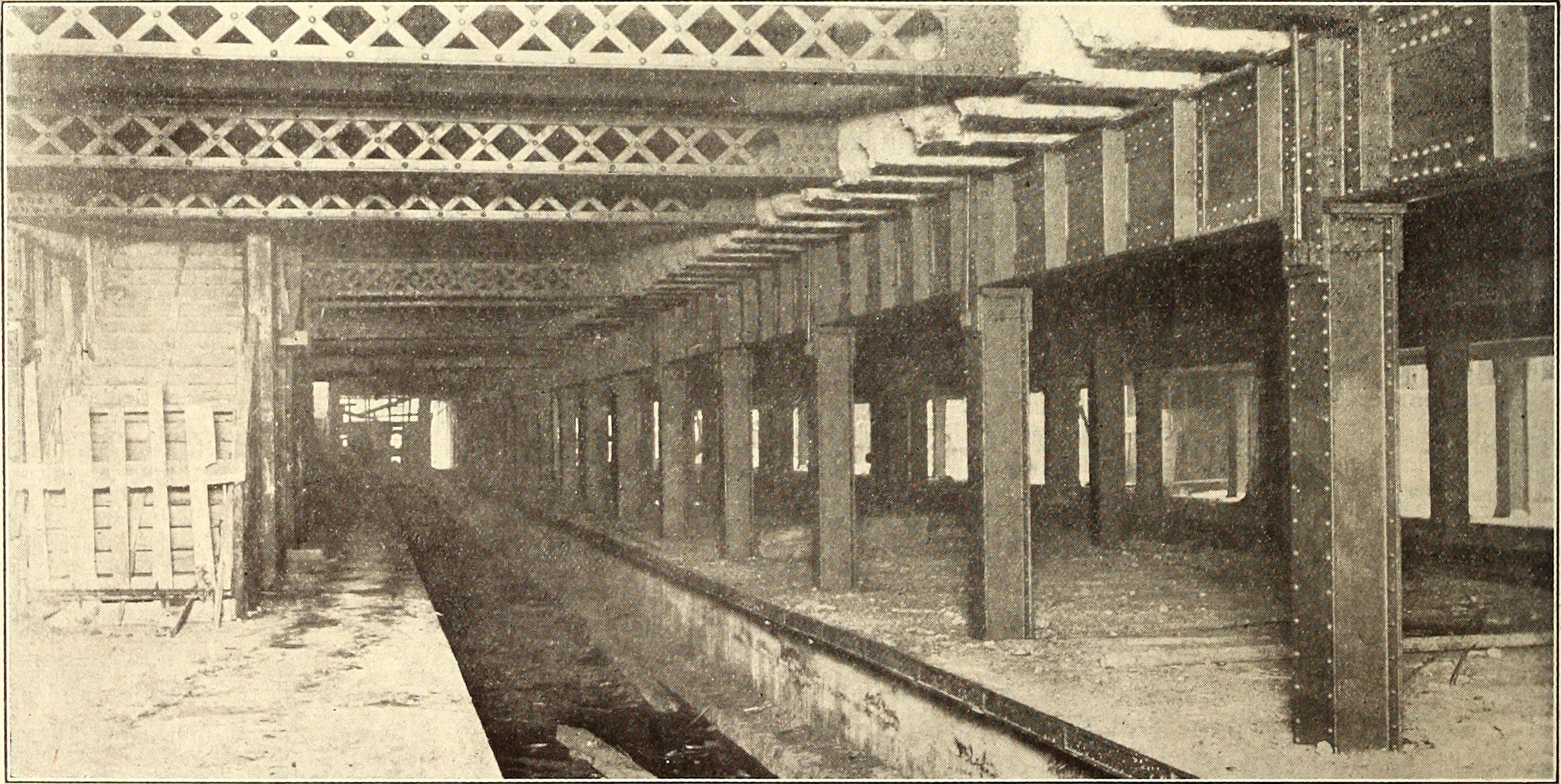
The Essex Street station during its construction

Next to the Brooklyn-bound local track is the closed Williamsburg Bridge Trolley Terminal, which was built along with the subway station and opened several months earlier. The terminal consisted of eight turning loops with low-level platforms which were used for trolley service from 1908 to 1948 that traveled over the Williamsburg Bridge to different parts of Brooklyn.

The underground terminal for the subway adjacent to the trolley terminal opened on September 16, 1908. The station initially contained only two tracks which ended at the west end of the station. It also had an additional southern side platform adjacent to the trolley terminal, with the station organized in a Spanish solution. The station was rebuilt for through service from 1911 to 1913 for the Centre Street Subway to extend to Chambers Street. The station's platforms originally could only fit six 67-foot-long (20 m) cars. In April 1926, the New York City Board of Transportation (BOT) received bids for the lengthening of platforms at three stations on the Centre Street Loop, including the Essex Street station, to accommodate eight-car trains. The New York City Board of Estimate approved funds for the project in July 1926, and the extensions were completed in 1927, bringing the length of the platforms to 535 feet (163 m).

The remaining portion of the subway line is configured with four tracks; however, the Essex Street station accommodates only three tracks and two platforms. There exists a provision for an additional fourth track to traverse through the trolley terminal area and integrate with the subway infrastructure west of the trolley terminal, contingent upon the future requirement for a four-track subway station. Historically, the elevated train service has been remarkably intensive, paralleled by high patronage of the trolley service, thereby precluding any proposals for expansion. A potential expansion would have entailed the addition of a second side platform to the south of the southernmost track, abutting the trolley terminal. This expansion would necessitate the demolition of the existing island platform to facilitate the construction of the fourth track; alternatively, the fourth track could be constructed adjacent to the southernmost track, resulting in a station layout featuring two side platforms and one island platform, analogous to the IRT platforms at Atlantic Avenue-Barclays Center.

After streetcar service ended in 1948, the former track area on the south side of the bridge was rebuilt into auto lanes with a new ramp from street level closing off the former downhill ramp to the trolley terminal. The trolley terminal itself, however, was left vacant, and small portions were converted to storerooms and an emergency exit to the southern corners of Norfolk Street and Delancey Street. The vacant space was the proposed location of the LowLine, a planned underground park, but after fundraising proved unsuccessful, the project was indefinitely postponed in February 2020. Prior to 1913, the BMT station was also known as Delancey Street.

=== Image gallery ===
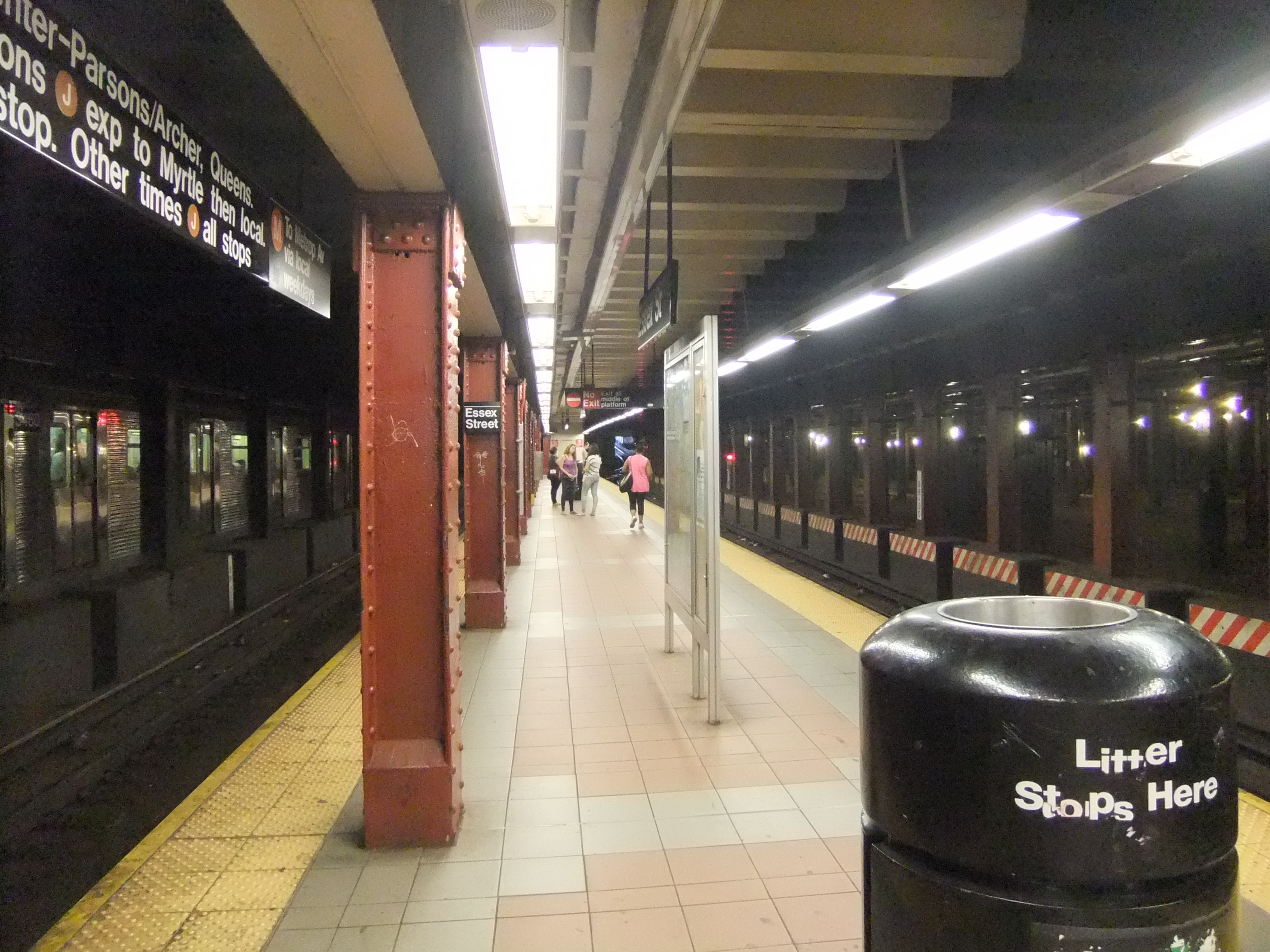
The island platform

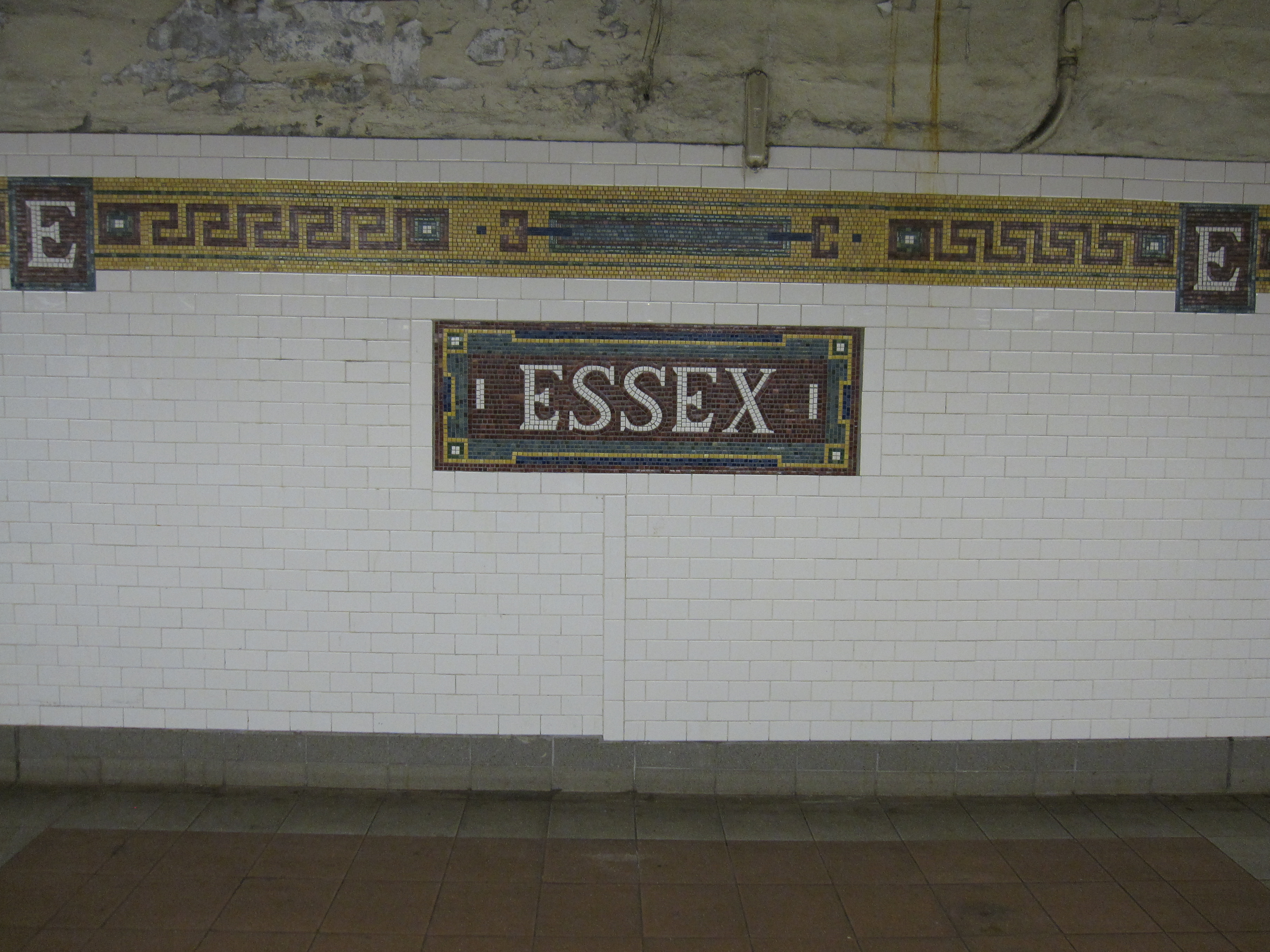
Name mosaic

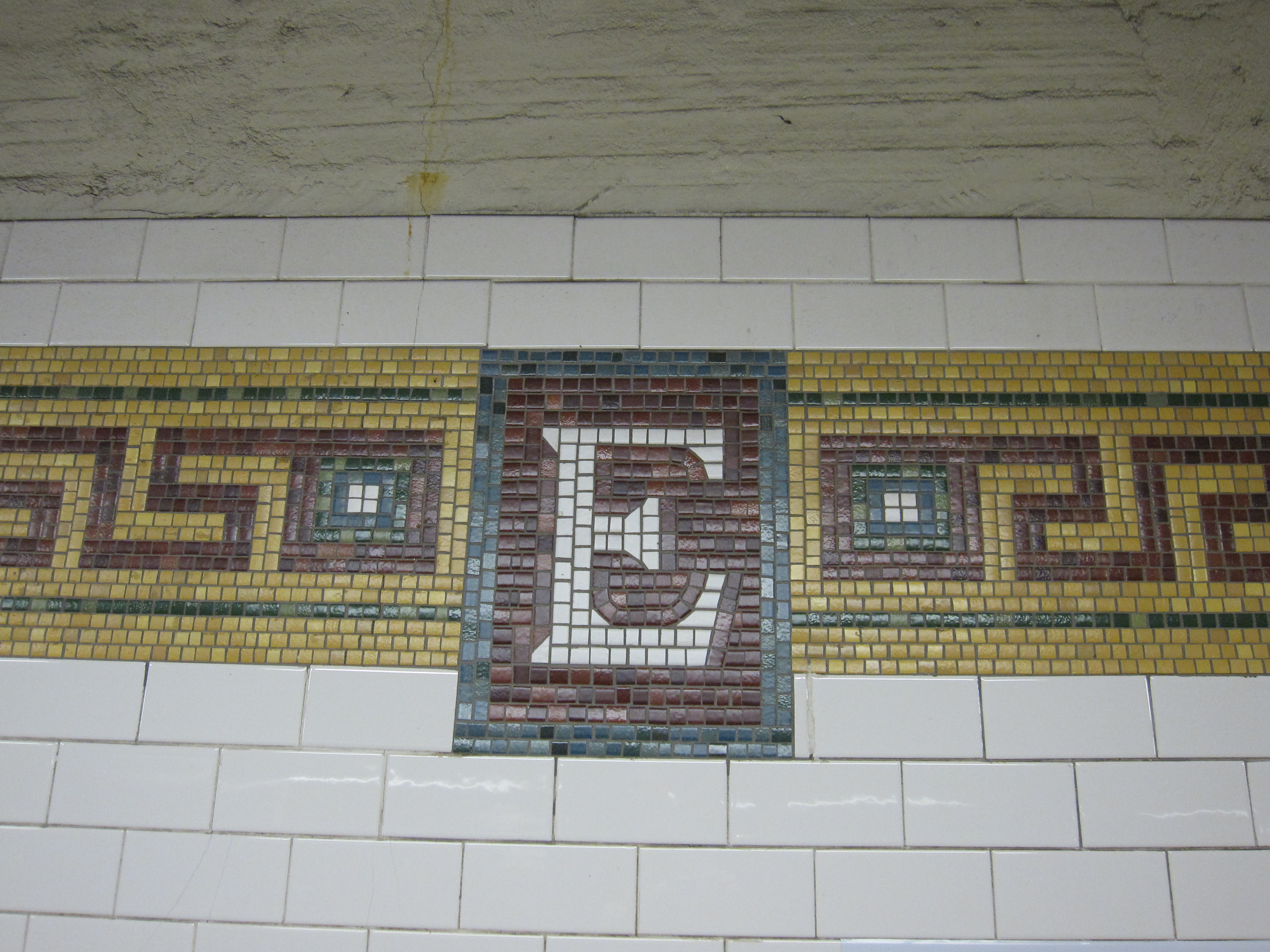
Letter mosaic

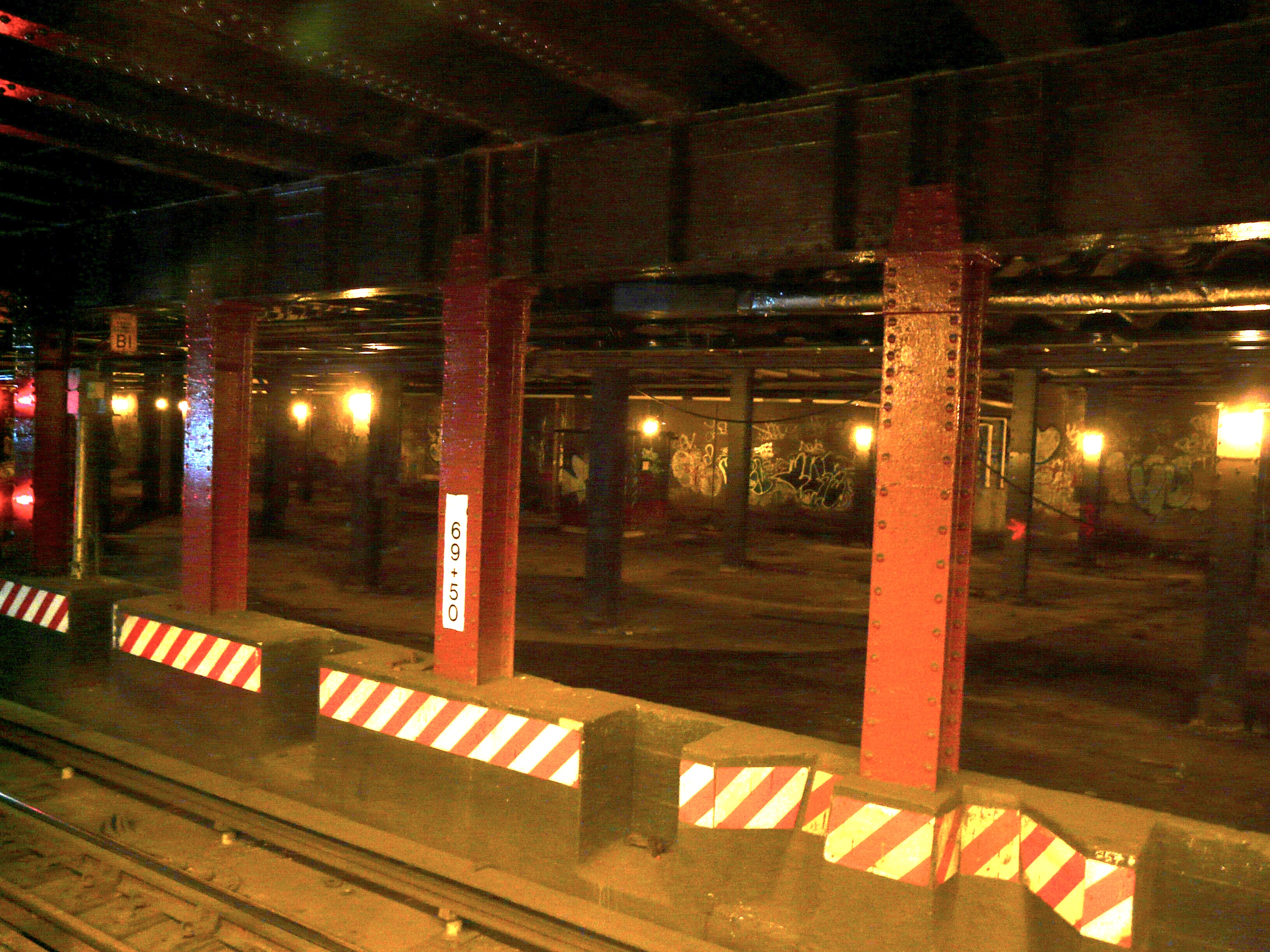
The abandoned trolley terminal viewed from the island platform

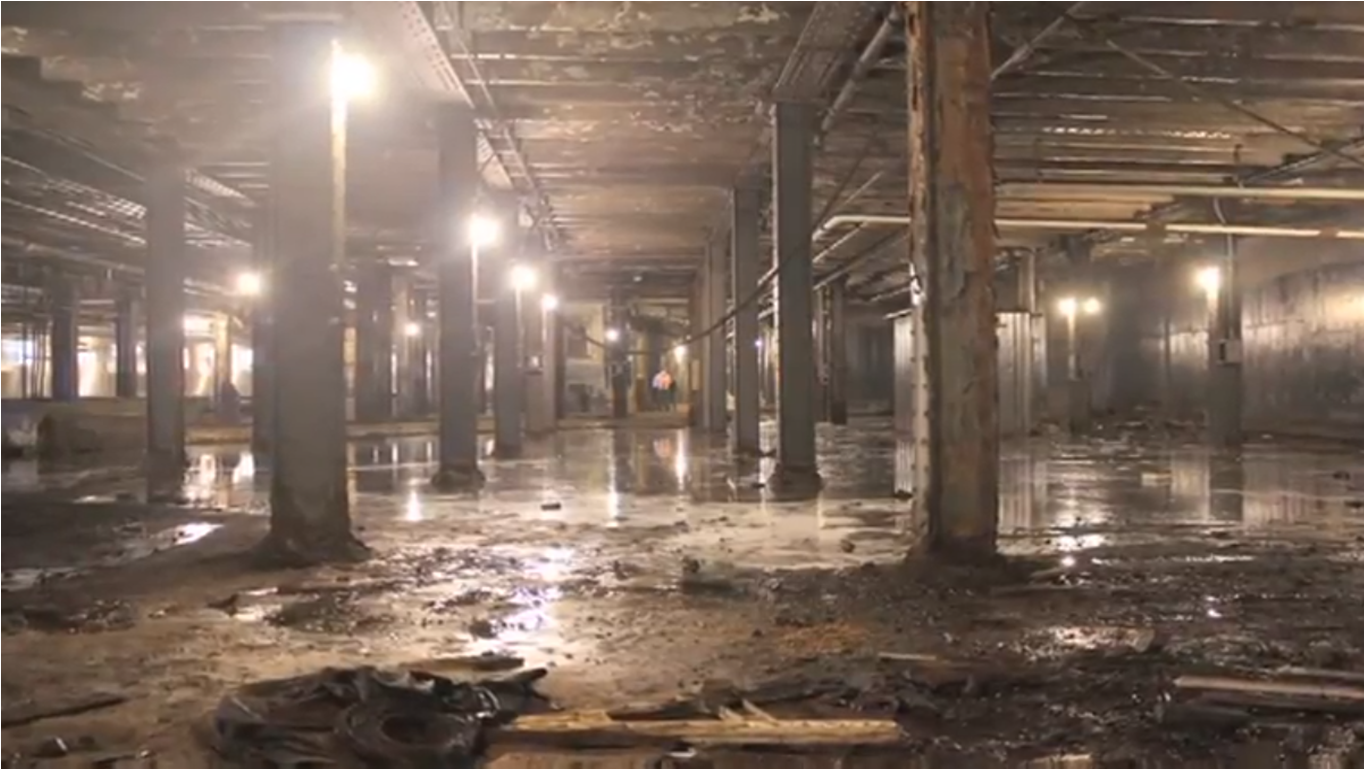
The abandoned trolley terminal

== IND Sixth Avenue Line platforms ==
Delancey Street
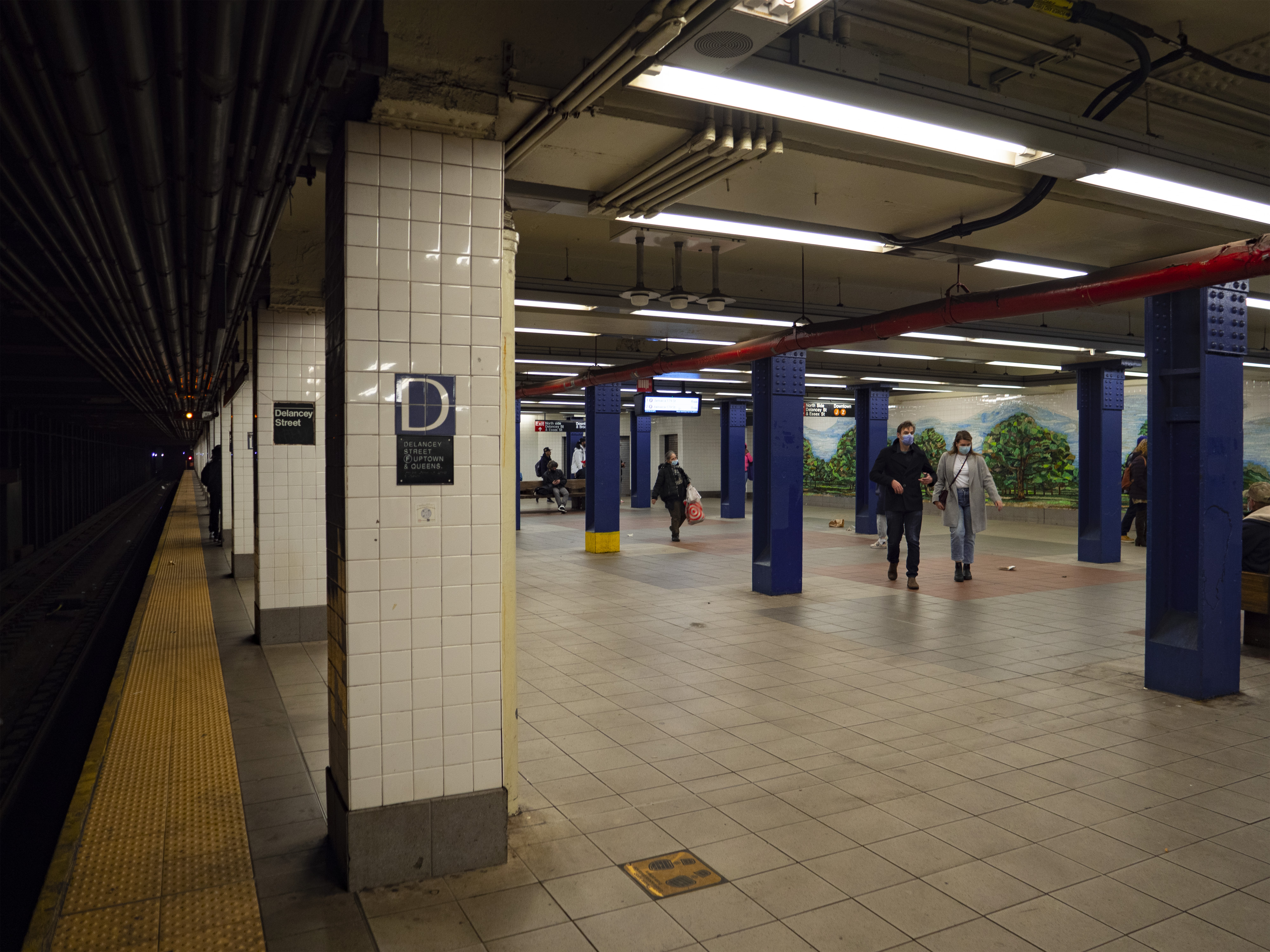
- View of northbound platform

Station statistics
- Division: B (IND)
- Line: IND Sixth Avenue Line
- Services: F (all times) <F> (two rush hour trains, peak direction)
- Platforms: 2 side platforms
- Tracks: 2

Other information
- Opened: January 1, 1936; 90 years ago
- Accessible: No; planned
Services
| Preceding station | New York City Subway | Following station |
|---|---|---|
| Second Avenue F <F> toward Jamaica–179th Street | Local | East Broadway F <F> toward Coney Island–Stillwell Avenue |
Track layout
Station service legend
| Symbol | Description |
| Stops all times | Stops all times |
| Stops rush hours in the peak direction only (limited service) | Stops rush hours in the peak direction only (limited service) |

The Delancey Street station (also announced as Delancey Street–Essex Street) is a station on the IND Sixth Avenue Line, and has two tracks and two side platforms. The station is served by the F at all times and the <F> during rush hours in the peak direction. The station is between Second Avenue to the north and East Broadway to the south.

The station has a part-time booth on the south side of Delancey Street and has two street staircases. Crossovers connect both platforms to the BMT platforms, which are above and perpendicular to the IND platforms. Both platforms have a renovated medium Parma violet trim line with a black border, as well as renovated tile captions in a different font, spaced farther apart, and far lower on the wall than the originals. Only the original mosaic name tablets remain, which read "DELANCEY ST." in white sans-serif lettering on a dark Parma violet background and medium Parma violet border. The southbound platform is lined with indigo I-beam columns, while the northbound platform has tiled columns, both having the standard black station name plate with white lettering every other columns. In a departure from the norm of recent restorations, northbound platform columns that don't have the station name plate feature a large "D" composed of four tiles.

The station formerly had two mezzanine areas, split by the BMT station. Twelve staircases, six on each platform, led to the mezzanine. Most were removed; only the stairs at the extreme north end and the extreme south end of both platforms remain as stairways to emergency exits and storage space.

There are two large wall-sized pieces of artwork, one on each wall where the staircase exits and transfers are located. The artist for both glass mosaics is Ming Fay (2004). The artwork on the downtown side is titled Shad Crossing and details two giant shad fish swimming, along with another wall mosaic of blue waters. In the late 19th century, shad were found along the Hudson River when new immigrants came to New York, many of whom settled on the Lower East Side. The new staircase to the relocated full-time booth also has another painting of a shad wrapped around the bottom of the stairs.

The uptown platform is titled Delancey Orchard and has a cherry orchard tree mosaic, which symbolized the tree owned by the Delancey family in the 18th century. Miniature versions appear along all staircases leading from the Delancey Street platforms to either fare control.

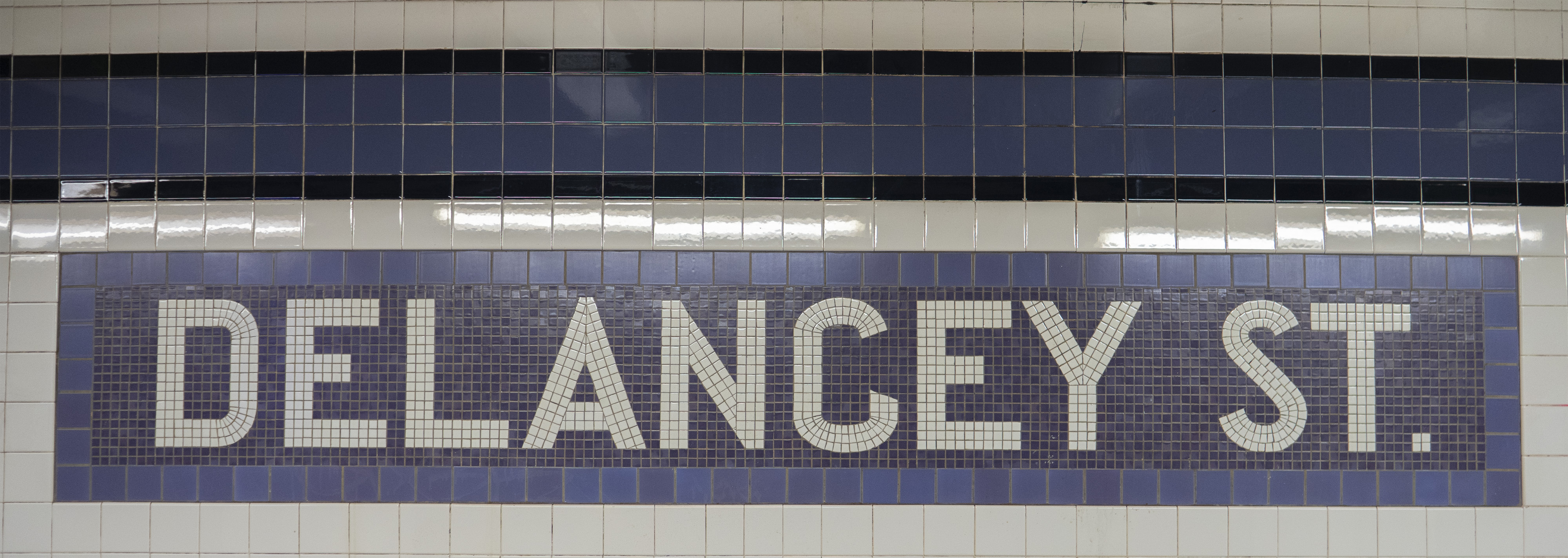
Original mosaic name tablet under renovated trim line

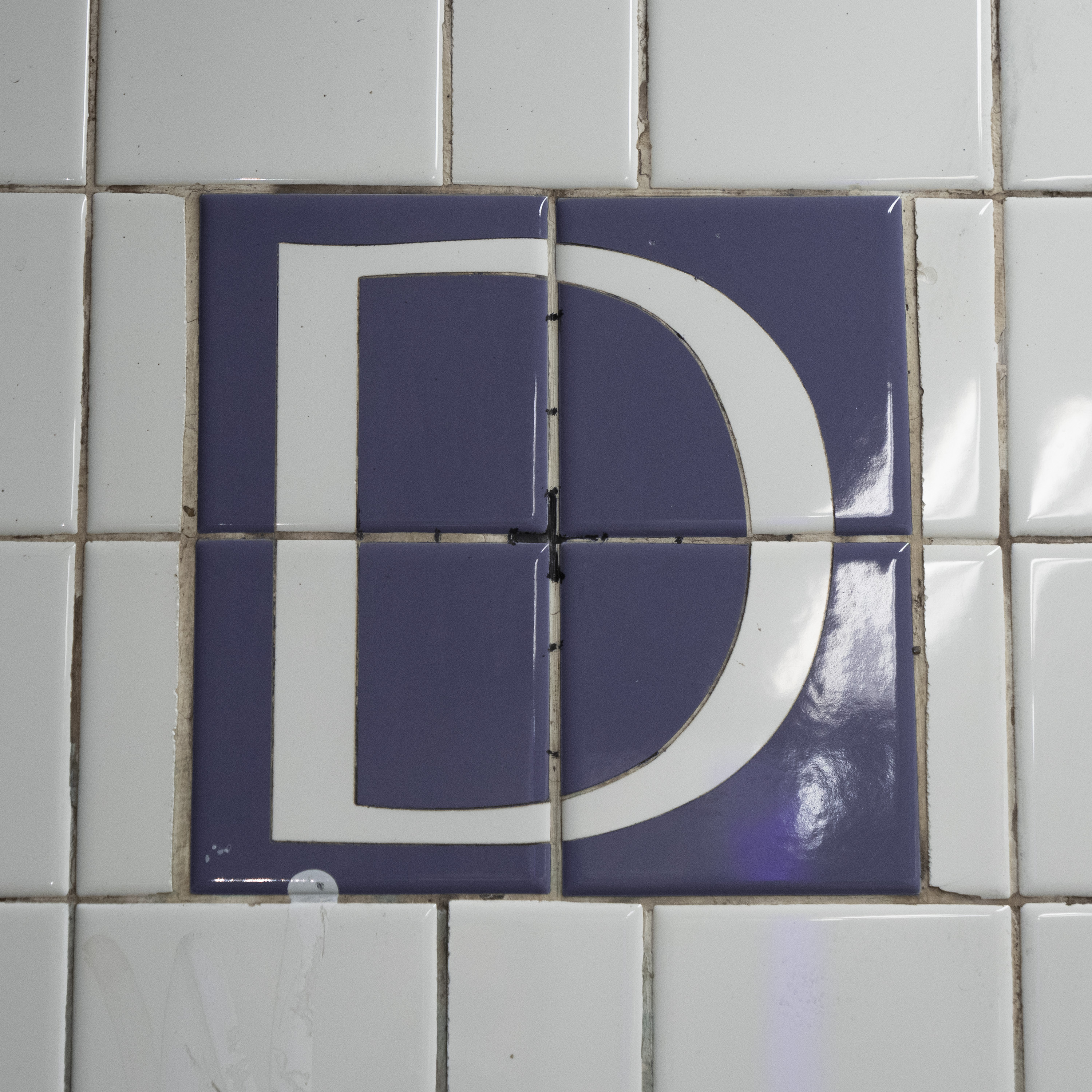
"D" tiles on alternating northbound platform columns

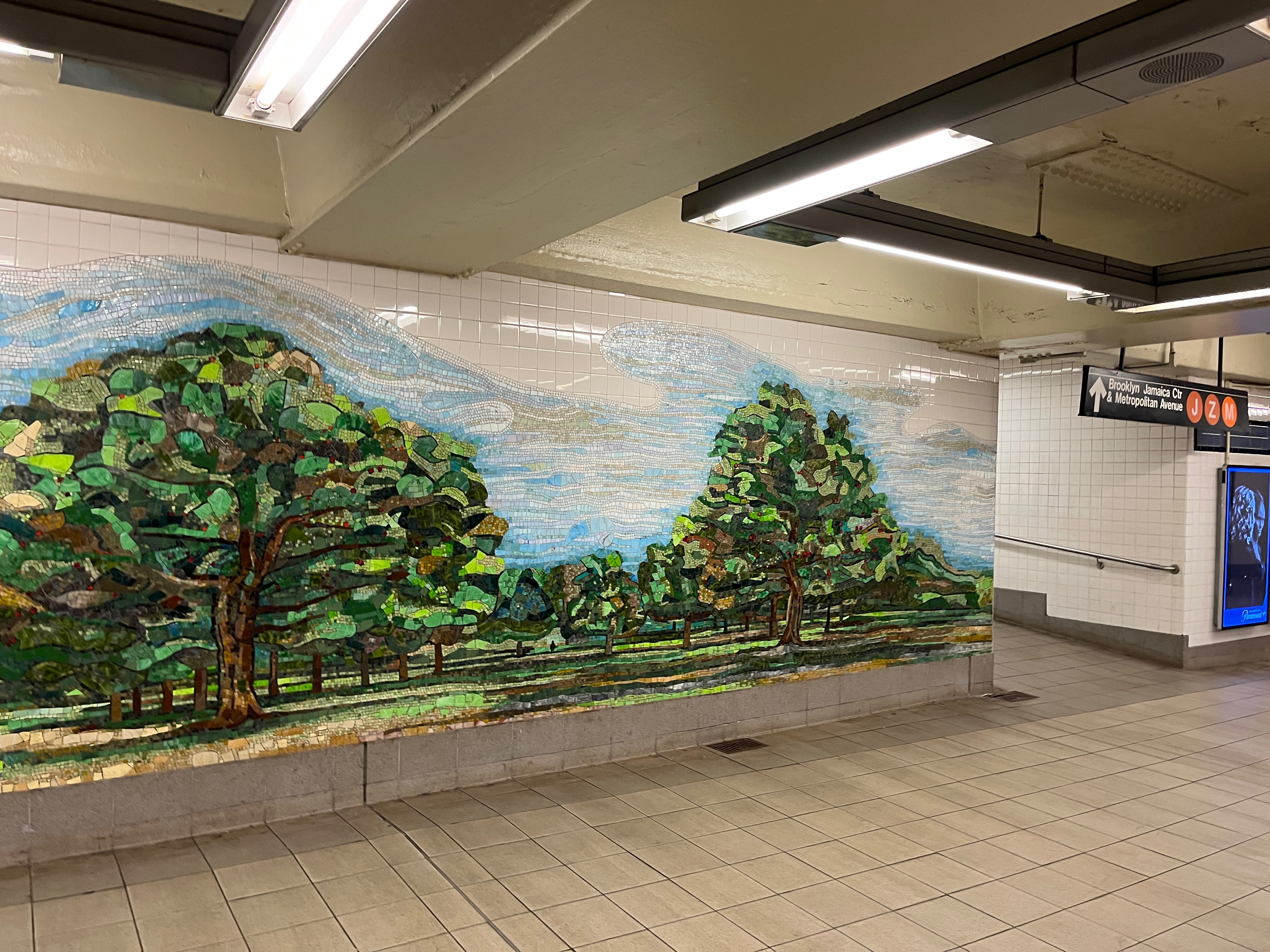
Delancey Orchard mosaic on the northbound platform

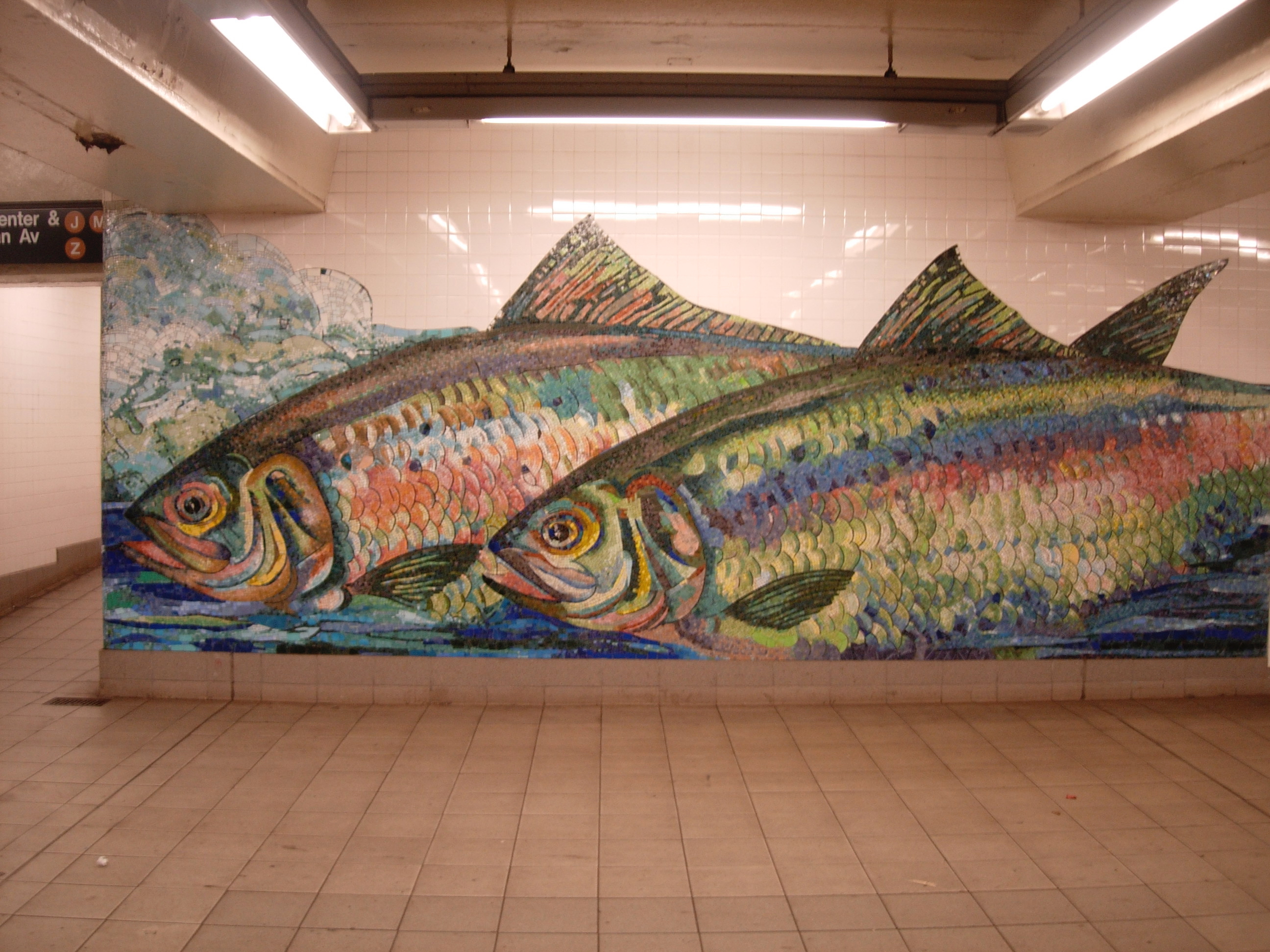
Shad Crossing mosaic on the southbound platform

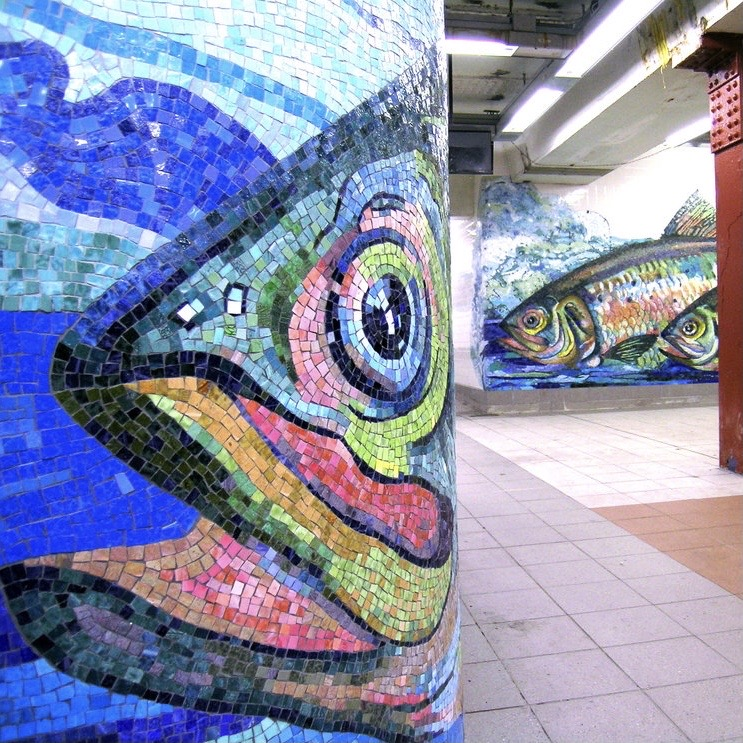
Closeup of Shad Crossing, 2004. Photograph by Marissa Alper
