= 168th Street station (BMT Jamaica Line) =

New York City Subway station in Queens (closed 1977)

168th Street
- Former New York City Subway station
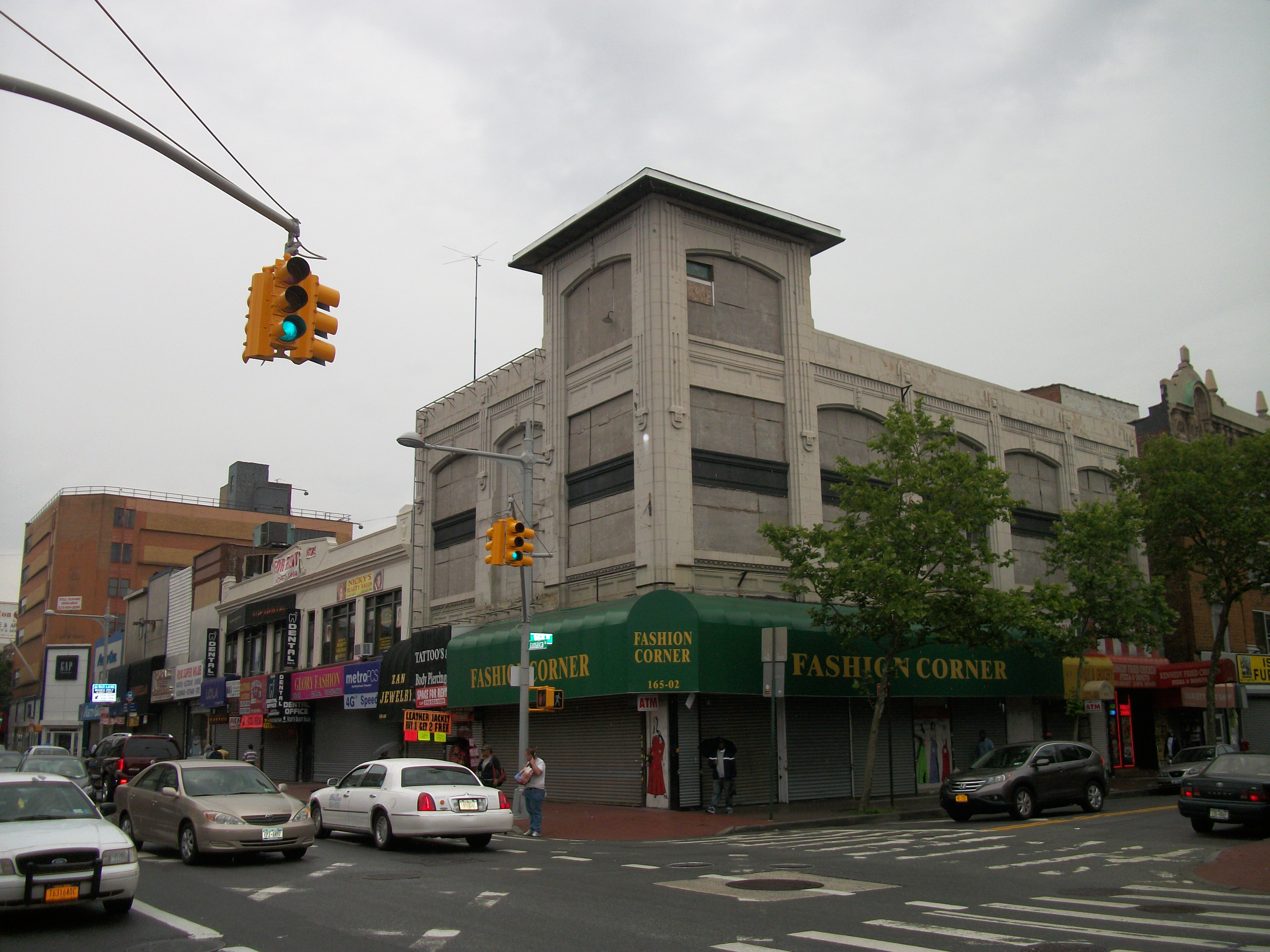
- Former 168th Street station building at Jamaica Avenue and 165th Street, seen in 2013.

Station statistics
- Address: Jamaica Avenue and 168th Street; Queens, New York 11433
- Borough: Queens
- Locale: Jamaica
- Coordinates: 40°42′20″N 73°47′40″W
- Division: B (BMT)
- Line: BMT Jamaica Line
- Services: None (demolished)
- Structure: Elevated
- Platforms: 1 island platform
- Tracks: 2

Other information
- Opened: July 3, 1918; 108 years ago
- Closed: September 10, 1977; 48 years ago
- Former/other names: Cliffside Avenue; Grand Street

Station succession
- Next north: (Terminus)
- Next south: 160th Street (demolished)
Location

Street map
Station service legend
Symbol	Description
Stops all times	Stops in station at all times
Stops all times except late nights	Stops all times except late nights
Stops late nights only	Stops late nights only
Stops late nights and weekends	Stops late nights and weekends only
Stops weekdays during the day	Stops weekdays during the day
Stops weekends during the day	Stops weekends during the day
Stops all times except rush hours in the peak direction	Stops all times except rush hours in the peak direction
Stops all times except weekdays in the peak direction	Stops all times except weekdays in the peak direction
Stops daily except rush hours in the peak direction	Stops all times except nights and rush hours in the peak direction
Stops rush hours only	Stops rush hours only
Stops rush hours in the peak direction only	Stops rush hours in the peak direction only
Station closed	Station is closed
(Details about time periods)

The 168th Street station was the terminal station on the demolished section of the BMT Jamaica Line in Queens, New York City. It was located between 165th and 168th Streets on Jamaica Avenue.

== History ==
=== Early years ===
168th Street was part of two Dual Contracts extensions of the BMT Broadway-Jamaica Line east of Cypress Hills and the "S-Curve" from Fulton Street to Jamaica Avenue. It opened on July 3, 1918, replacing 111th Street as the line's terminus. 168th Street station also replaced the Canal Street Station along the Atlantic Avenue Rapid Transit line (today part of the LIRR Main Line), which closed nineteen years earlier, and supplanted the trolley service on Jamaica Avenue.

=== Decline and closure ===
In 1937, the Queens Boulevard Line of the city-owned Independent Subway System was extended to a new terminal at 169th Street and Hillside Avenue, four blocks away. The opening of the IND terminal drew passengers away from the BMT lines.

Many groups had called for the removal of the extension in the Jamaica Business district since shortly after it opened, and by the 1960s the city planned to close the station and significant portions of the line in Jamaica. Many merchants blamed the line for causing blight and hurting business in the neighborhood.

The line was also torn down in preparation for the completion of the Archer Avenue Subway one block south, which would serve the Jamaica Line and a spur of the IND Queens Boulevard Line, and due to political pressure in the area. Construction of that line began in 1972. 168th Street closed at midnight on September 10, 1977, and the elevated structure from 168th Street to Sutphin Boulevard was torn down by 1979. The line was truncated to Queens Boulevard, with the Q49 bus replacing the demolished portion of the line until December 11, 1988.

=== Current status ===
In spite of the support of local business owners for the demolition of the line, stores continued to suffer and several establishments closed due to the absence of the El. This included the large Macy's location in the 165th Street Pedestrian Mall near the bus terminal.

Unlike the 160th Street and Sutphin Boulevard stations, which were completely demolished in 1979, 168th Street's former control tower, known as the "Station and Trainmen's Building", still remains standing on the southeast corner of 165th Street and Jamaica Avenue. It sits inactive atop a block of storefronts. The exit stairways for the station were purchased by a private citizen to be used on their estate in Nissequogue on the Long Island Sound.

The Archer Avenue Line was completed in 1988, nearly ten years after the closure of the station, but it does not extend east to 168th Street. The closest subway stations to this former station are Jamaica Center–Parsons/Archer, at Parsons Boulevard and Archer Avenue, which is nine blocks west and one block south, as well as the existing 169th Street station, which is four blocks to the north on Hillside Avenue.

== Station layout ==
This elevated station had two tracks and one island platform. It was constructed with a diamond crossover switch west of the station, and a large signal and switch tower built to the south side of the elevated structure at 165th Street. The entrance to the station at this location was built into an alcove of the signal building, which contained storefronts at ground level. Past the crossover, the line expanded to three tracks, with the middle track ending at 160th Street. While reports say the station had a concrete platform, photographs show a wooden platform. It served trains from the BMT Jamaica-Nassau Street Line to Manhattan (the predecessors to today's J and Z trains) and from the BMT Lexington Avenue Line. The station also connected to the nearby 165th Street Bus Terminal (opened in 1936) at 89th Avenue and Merrick Boulevard via an exit on 165th Street.
