= 75th Street–Elderts Lane station =

New York City Subway station

75 Street–Elderts Lane
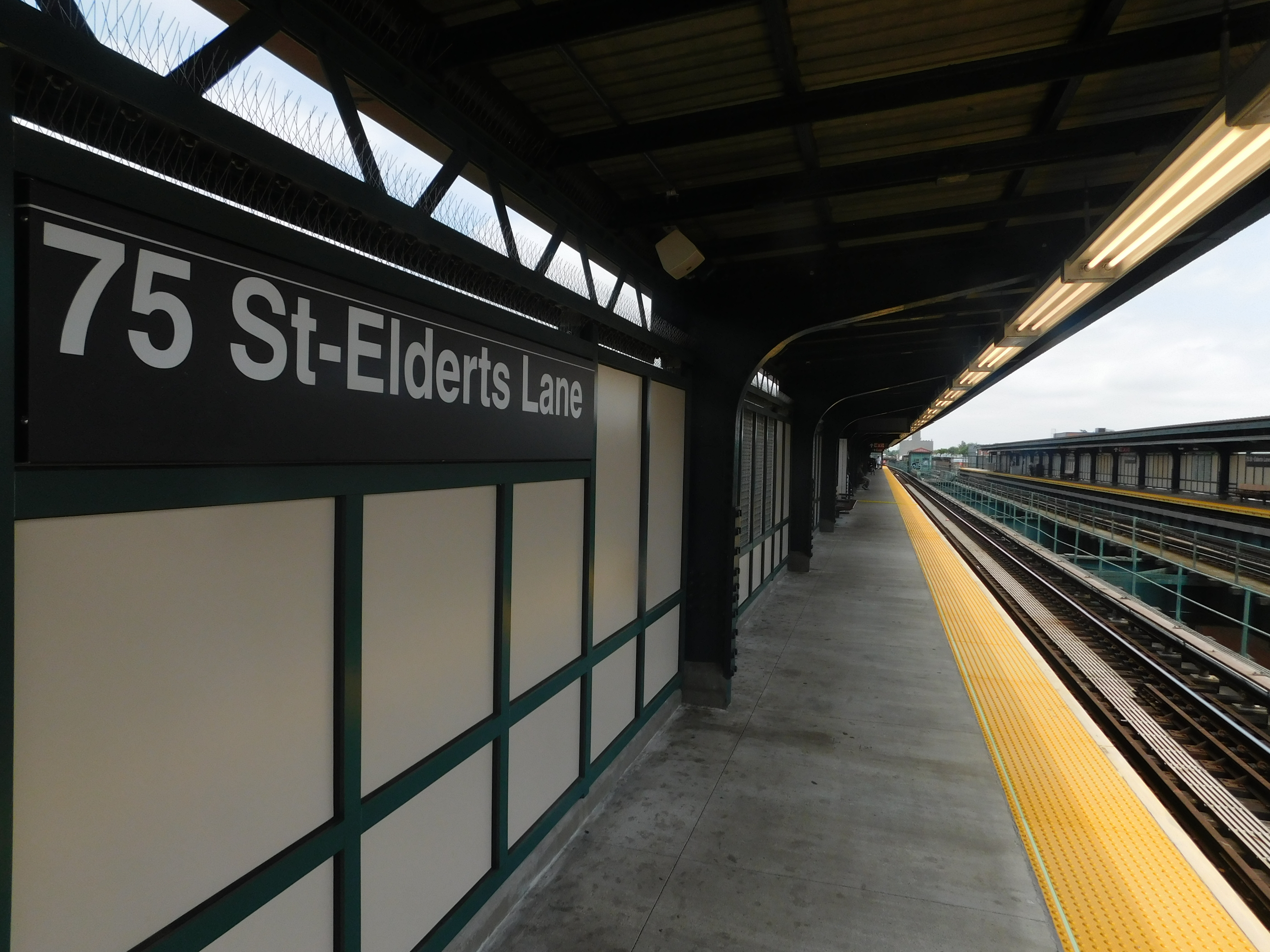
- Southbound platform

Station statistics
- Address: 75th Street and Jamaica Avenue; Queens, New York
- Borough: On the border of Brooklyn and Queens
- Locale: Cypress Hills, Brooklyn; Woodhaven, Queens
- Coordinates: 40.691377°N 73.866534°W
- Division: B (BMT)
- Line: BMT Jamaica Line
- Services: J (all except rush hours, peak direction); Z (rush hours, peak direction)
- Transit: NYCT Bus: Q56; MTA Bus: Q7
- Structure: Elevated
- Platforms: 2 side platforms
- Tracks: 2

Other information
- Opened: May 28, 1917 (109 years ago)
- Former/other names: Elderts Lane; 75th Street

Traffic
- 2025: 849,330 ▲98.9%
- Rank: 335 out of 423
Services
| Preceding station | New York City Subway | Following station |
|---|---|---|
| Crescent Street Z skip-stop | J/Z (New York City Subway service) | Woodhaven Boulevard Z skip-stop |
| Cypress Hills J toward Broad Street | J/Z (New York City Subway service) | 85th Street–Forest Parkway J toward Jamaica Center–York College |
Location
Location within New York City Subway
Location within New York City
Location within New York
Track layout
Street map
Station service legend
| Symbol | Description |
| Stops all times except rush hours in the peak direction | Stops all times except rush hours in the peak direction |
| Stops rush hours in the peak direction only | Stops rush hours in the peak direction only |

The 75th Street–Elderts Lane station (formerly 75th Street station and originally Elderts Lane station) is a skip-stop station on the BMT Jamaica Line of the New York City Subway. The station is located at 75th Street and Jamaica Avenue and is largely within Woodhaven, Queens, with a small portion in Cypress Hills, Brooklyn. It is served by the J train at all times except rush hours in the peak direction, when the Z train takes over service.

== History ==
This station opened on May 28, 1917 under the Brooklyn Union Elevated Railroad, an affiliate of the Brooklyn Rapid Transit Company.

In the late 1980s, the Elderts Lane end of the station had a mezzanine area, but it was closed, and had become a haven to drugs and prostitution, so the staircases to the south end of the station were removed. When it was found that people were still getting into the closed mezzanine, the entire mezzanine area was dismantled, leaving the only exit and entrance to the station on the north side (75th Street). It was reported in Newsday on February 20, 1988, that the mezzanines at Elderts Lane, Forest Parkway and 104th Street stations would be torn down.

In February 2023, the Metropolitan Transportation Authority announced that this station would temporarily close for renovations as part of a station renewal contract at four stations on the Jamaica Line. Starting February 27, the eastbound platforms at this station and Woodhaven Boulevard closed. The closure shifted to the Manhattan-bound platform in January 2024, and the platform reopened in July 2024. Work included platform renewals, replacement of stairs, canopies, and windscreens, installation of artwork, and minimizing the gaps between the train and the platform edge. The work was performed by Gramercy PJS Joint-Venture.

== Station layout ==
This elevated station has two side platforms and two tracks with space for a center track. The station is centered between Eldert Lane and 75th Street. The eastern end (railroad north) end of the station is just east of 75th Street while the western end (railroad south) lies over the west side of Eldert Lane. Since this portion of Eldert Lane lies on the border between Brooklyn and Queens, most of the station is in Queens, with a small portion of it in Cypress Hills, Brooklyn. The MTA counts the station as being in Queens. The New York City GIS portal labels the station as "75th St–Eldert Ln", with the "s" removed from "Elderts," matching the current name of the street. (The street name has evolved from Eldert's Lane to Elderts Lane to the current Eldert Lane, which gives rise to the discrepancy between the MTA naming and the street name.)

Both platforms have beige windscreens and brown canopies supported by green frames and support columns along their entire lengths except for a small section at the south end. Here, they have black steel waist high fences with lampposts at regular intervals.

The 1990 artwork here is called Five Points of Observation by Kathleen McCarthy. It affords a view of the street from the platforms and resembles a face when seen from the street. This artwork is also located in four other stations on this line.

=== Exits ===
This station has one elevated station house beneath the tracks. Staircases from the east end (railroad north) of each platform, one each, lead down to a waiting area/crossover, where a turnstile bank provides entrance/exit from the station. Outside fare control, there is a token booth and two staircases going down to either eastern corner of 75th Street and Jamaica Avenue. The other exits on the west end (railroad south) of the platform, which led to Elderts Lane, were removed.
