= Woodhaven Boulevard (disambiguation) =

Woodhaven Boulevard is a major boulevard in the New York City borough of Queens.

Woodhaven Boulevard may also refer to:

- Woodhaven Boulevard (IND Queens Boulevard Line), serving the E, F, M, and R trains
- Woodhaven Boulevard (BMT Jamaica Line), serving the J and Z trains

== See also ==
- Woodhaven Boulevard buses
