= 160th Street station =

New York City Subway station in Queens (closed 1977)

160th Street
- Former New York City Subway station
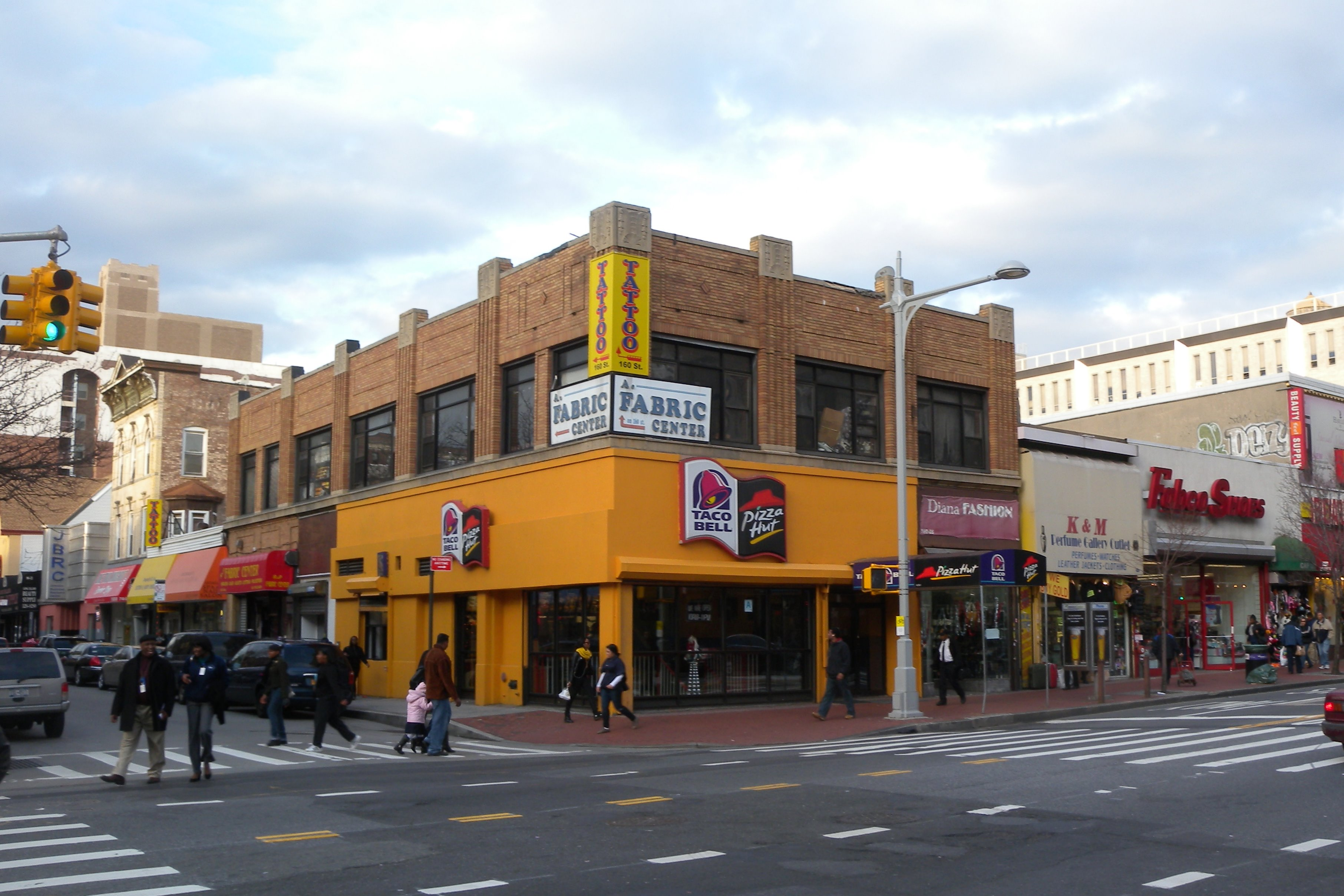
- Site, 30 years after demolition

Station statistics
- Address: Jamaica Avenue and 160th Street; Queens, New York 11433
- Borough: Queens
- Locale: Jamaica
- Coordinates: 40°42′13.1″N 73°47′57″W
- Division: B (BMT)
- Line: BMT Jamaica Line
- Services: None (demolished)
- Structure: Elevated
- Platforms: 2 side platforms
- Tracks: 3

Other information
- Opened: July 3, 1918; 108 years ago
- Closed: September 10, 1977; 48 years ago

Station succession
- Next north: 168th Street (demolished)
- Next south: Sutphin Boulevard (demolished)
Location
Location within New York City Subway
Location within New York City
Location within New York
Street map
Station service legend
Symbol	Description
Stops all times	Stops in station at all times
Stops all times except late nights	Stops all times except late nights
Stops late nights only	Stops late nights only
Stops late nights and weekends	Stops late nights and weekends only
Stops weekdays during the day	Stops weekdays during the day
Stops weekends during the day	Stops weekends during the day
Stops all times except rush hours in the peak direction	Stops all times except rush hours in the peak direction
Stops all times except weekdays in the peak direction	Stops all times except weekdays in the peak direction
Stops daily except rush hours in the peak direction	Stops all times except nights and rush hours in the peak direction
Stops rush hours only	Stops rush hours only
Stops rush hours in the peak direction only	Stops rush hours in the peak direction only
Station closed	Station is closed
(Details about time periods)

The 160th Street station was a station on the demolished section of the BMT Jamaica Line in Queens, New York City.

== History ==
This station was built as part of the Dual Contracts. It opened on July 3, 1918, thirteen years after the closing of New York Avenue Station along the Atlantic Avenue Rapid Transit line. During its early years, it had connections to five different trolley companies; the New York and Long Island Traction Company, the Long Island Electric Railway, the Manhattan and Queens Traction Company, the New York and Queens County Railway, and the Brooklyn and Queens Transit Corporation and its predecessors.

This station closed on September 10, 1977, with the Q49 bus replacing it until December 11, 1988, in anticipation of the Archer Avenue Subway and due to political pressure in the area.

This station along with the 168th Street and Sutphin Boulevard stations was demolished in 1979. It was replaced by the Jamaica Center–Parsons/Archer station, which opened on December 11, 1988. Between the closing of the el station and its replacement subway station, the existing Parsons Boulevard station, four blocks to the north on Hillside Avenue, served as a temporary substitute.

== Station layout ==
This elevated station had three tracks and two side platforms.
