= 111th Street station (BMT Jamaica Line) =

New York City Subway station in Queens

111 Street
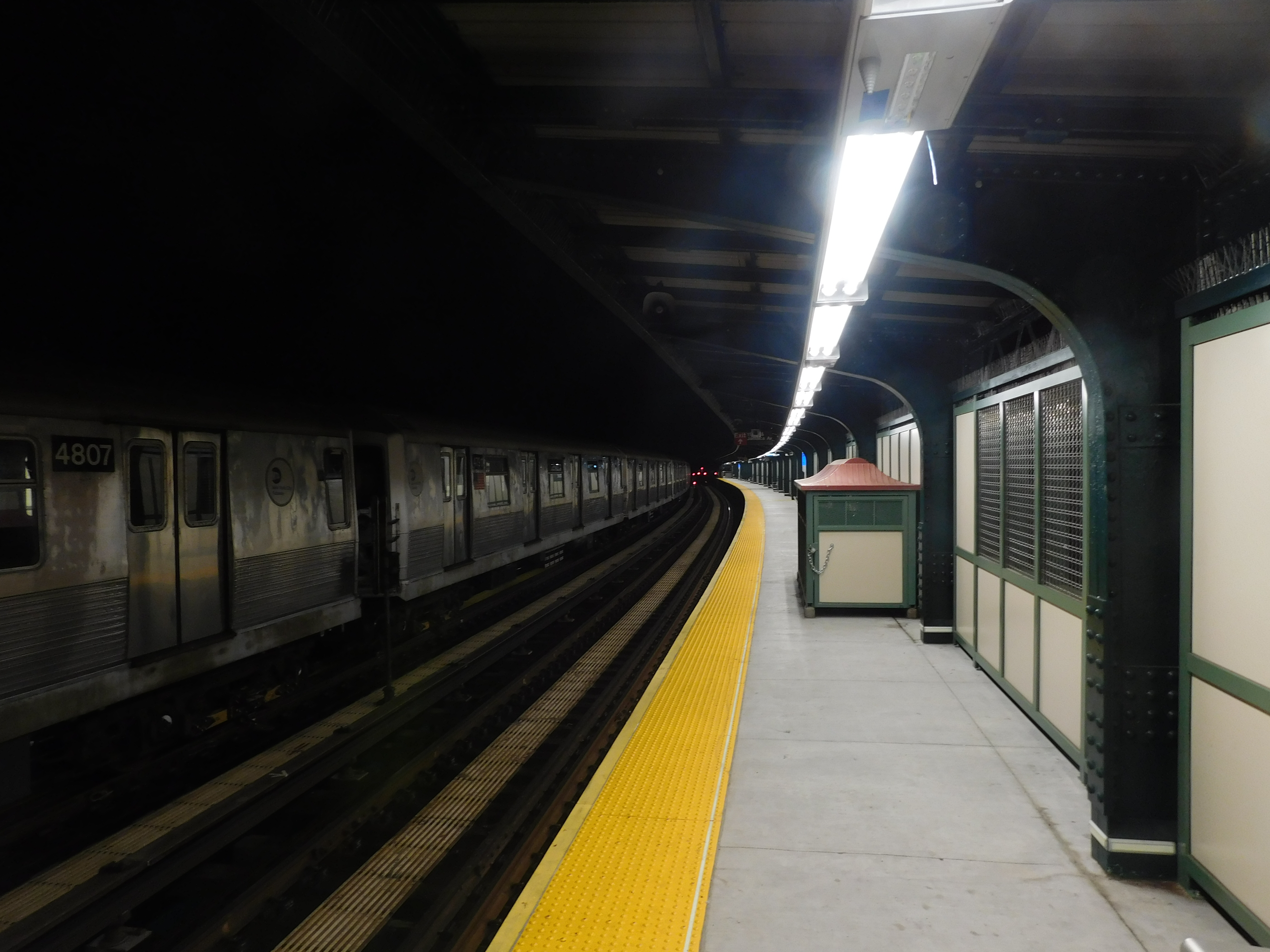
- Brooklyn bound platform

Station statistics
- Address: 111th Street and Jamaica Avenue; Queens, New York
- Borough: Queens
- Locale: Richmond Hill
- Coordinates: 40.696876°N 73.837223°W
- Division: B (BMT)
- Line: BMT Jamaica Line
- Services: J (all times)
- Transit: NYCT Bus: Q56; MTA Bus: Q37/B
- Structure: Elevated
- Platforms: 2 side platforms
- Tracks: 3 (2 in passenger service)

Other information
- Opened: May 28, 1917 (109 years ago)
- Closed: January 14, 2019; 7 years ago (reconstruction)
- Rebuilt: June 11, 2019; 7 years ago
- Former/other names: Greenwood Avenue; 111th Street–Richmond Hill

Traffic
- 2025: 521,227 ▲11.4%
- Rank: 391 out of 423
Services
Preceding station	New York City Subway	Following station
Woodhaven Boulevard J skip-stop	J/Z (New York City Subway service)	Sutphin Boulevard–Archer Avenue–JFK Airport J skip-stop
104th Street J toward Broad Street	J/Z (New York City Subway service)	121st Street J toward Jamaica Center–York College
does not stop here
Location
Location within New York City Subway
Location within New York City
Location within New York
Track layout
Street map
Station service legend
Symbol	Description
Stops all times except rush hours in the peak direction	Stops all times except rush hours in the peak direction
Stops rush hours in the peak direction only	Stops rush hours in the peak direction only

The 111th Street station is a skip-stop station on the BMT Jamaica Line of the New York City Subway. Located at the intersection of 111th Street and Jamaica Avenue in Richmond Hill, Queens, it is served at all times by the J train. The Z train skips this station when it operates.

== History ==
This station was opened on May 28, 1917 by the Brooklyn Union Elevated Railroad, an affiliate of the Brooklyn Rapid Transit Company, replacing Cypress Hills as the line's terminus.

The station was temporarily closed on January 14, 2019, for six months of structural repairs. As part of the work, the trackside girders and the platforms were replaced. Unlike the repairs done at 121st Street and 104th Street, which were done one platform at a time, both platforms were closed simultaneously to cut the work from 12 months to 6 months; as a result, the station reopened on June 11, 2019.

== Station layout ==
This elevated station has three tracks and two side platforms. The center track dead ends at bumper blocks on both sides of the station and has connections to both local tracks. It is only used for train storage. It was formerly used to turn trains for the BMT Lexington Avenue Elevated trains from 1917 until 1950. The track was also used to store trains while the Jamaica Line was being torn down north of 121st Street and the Archer Avenue Line was being built.

Both platforms have beige windscreens for their entire lengths and brown canopies with green frames and support columns except for a small section at the west (railroad south) end. Station signs are in the standard black with white lettering.

The 1990 artwork is called Points of Observation by Kathleen McCarthy. It is a face-shaped wire mesh sculpture that affords a view of the street from the platforms. The artwork also appears at 104th Street and at Woodhaven Bouelvard.

=== Exits ===
The station's only entrance/exit is an elevated station house beneath the tracks. Inside fare control, there is a single staircase to each platform at their south ends and a waiting area that allows a free transfer between directions. Outside fare control, there is a turnstile bank, token booth, and two staircases going down to either eastern corners of Jamaica Avenue and 111th Street.

This station formerly had another entrance/exit at the east (railroad north) end. The staircase to 113th Street was removed, but the elevated station house beneath the tracks and single staircase to each platform remain boarded up and intact. The station house is now used for storage and offices.
