= BMT Jamaica Line =

New York City Subway line

- The J and Z trains serve the entire BMT Jamaica Line. The M train serves the line west of Myrtle Avenue.

Overview
- Owner: City of New York
- Locale: Brooklyn and Queens, New York City
- Termini: Marcy Avenue; 121st Street
- Stations: 22

Service
- Type: Rapid transit
- System: New York City Subway
- Operator: New York City Transit Authority
- Daily ridership: 66,532 (2023)

History
- Opened: February 2, 1885; 141 years ago
- Last extension: 1918

Technical
- Number of tracks: 2-3
- Character: Elevated
- Track gauge: 4 ft 8 1/2 in (1,435 mm)
- Electrification: 600V DC third rail

The BMT Jamaica Line, formerly known as the Broadway (Brooklyn) Line, is an elevated rapid transit line of the B Division of the New York City Subway in Brooklyn and Queens. It runs from the Williamsburg Bridge southeast over Broadway to East New York, Brooklyn, and then east over Fulton Street and Jamaica Avenue to Jamaica, Queens. In western Jamaica, the line goes into a tunnel, becoming the lower level of the Archer Avenue lines in central Jamaica. The J and Z trains serve the entire length of the Jamaica Line, and the M serves the line west of Myrtle Avenue.

The longest elevated line in the system, the Jamaica Line includes the oldest existing elevated structure in the system – the original 1885 line of the Brooklyn Elevated Railroad, the former BMT Lexington Avenue Line between Gates Avenue and Van Siclen Avenue – as well as the newest elevated structure, the 1988 ramp into the Archer Avenue subway.

== Description ==
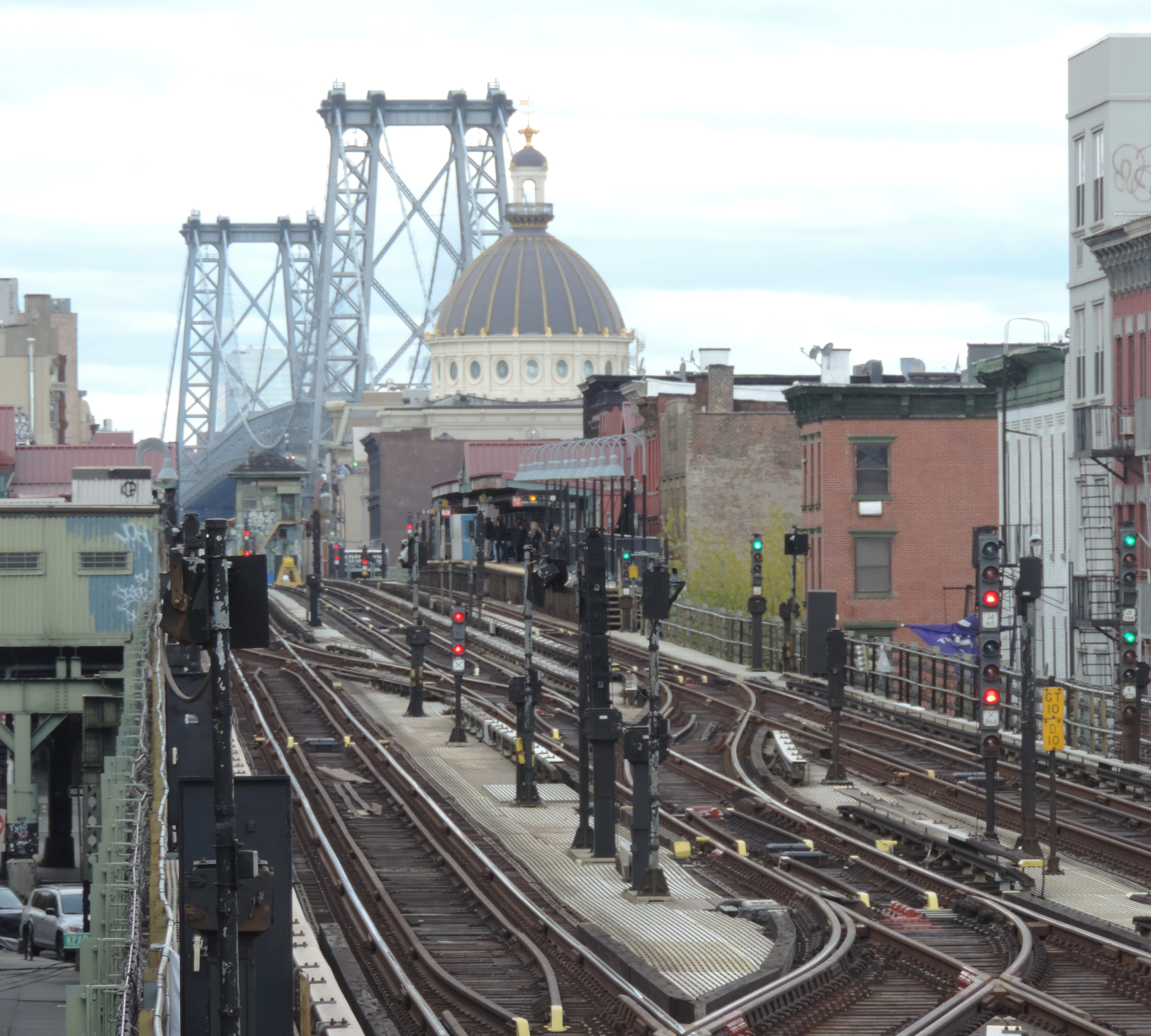
Three tracks over Broadway

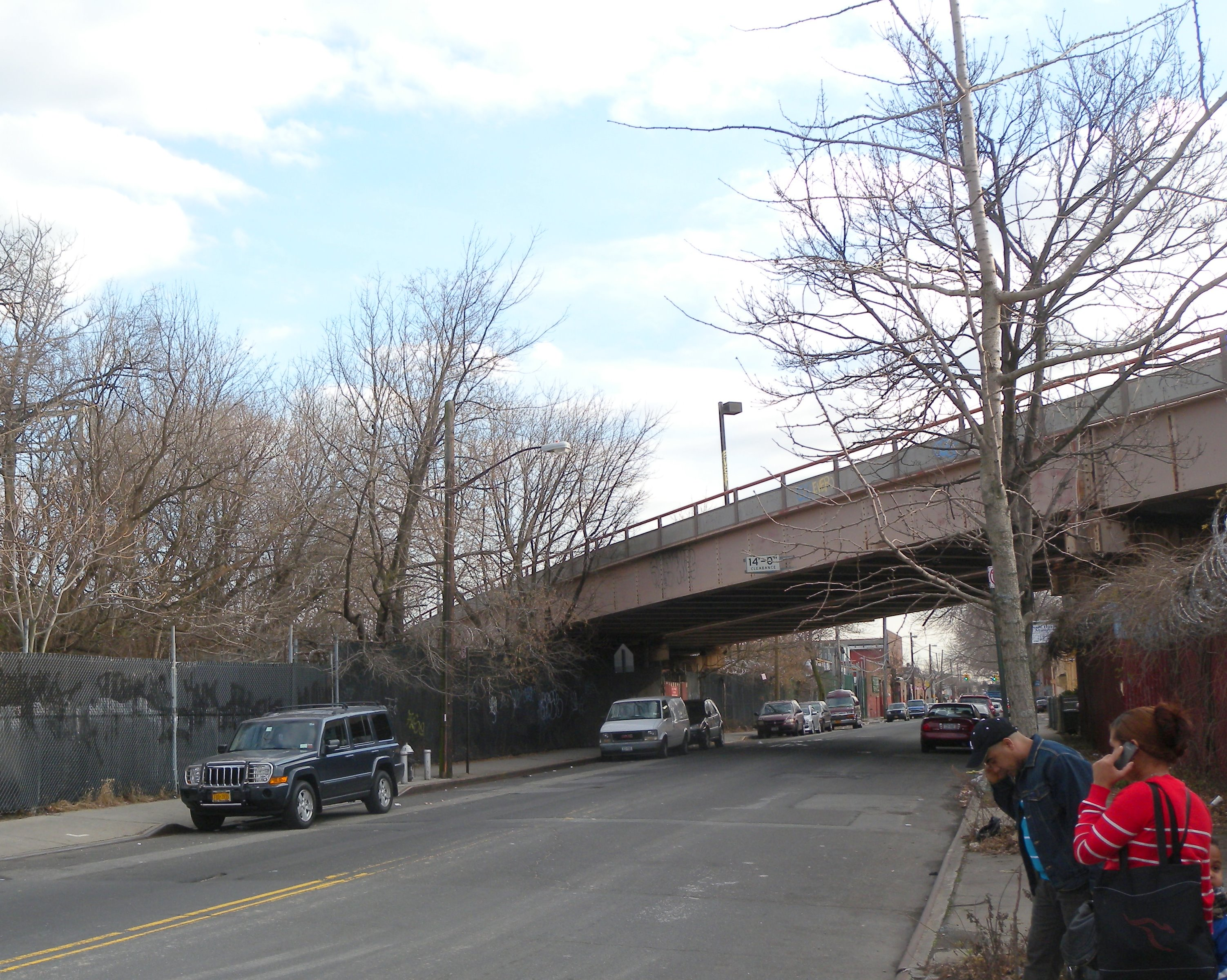
Elevated ramp to Archer Avenue

The Jamaica Line includes a variety of structures. The original BMT Jamaica Line started from Broadway Ferry, Brooklyn. The line was two tracks, and connected with Marcy Avenue, from the west. This section, which was called the "Broadway Spur", has a short, but easily seen remnant (about one-half of a block in length, no tracks, just maintenance buildings) west and south of where the line curves toward the Williamsburg Bridge.

From Marcy Avenue to a point just before Alabama Avenue the line operates on the structure of old elevated railways, but substantially rebuilt and upgraded to a three-track line around 1916 under the Dual Contracts of 1913. The section between Gates Avenue and Van Siclen Avenue was completed in 1885 as part of the BMT Lexington Avenue Line. From Alabama Avenue to just before the current Cypress Hills station, the Jamaica Line operates on the oldest elevated structure in New York City, a steel-reinforced cast iron line opened in 1893. East of Broadway Junction, a third middle trackway exists and elevates over the other two tracks, ending just west of the Alabama Avenue station. This track was intended to be an express track, but engineering studies completed after the work started indicated that the vibration of trains passing over the stations would be too severe and would literally shake the stations apart.

Between Crescent Street station and Cypress Hills, the line runs on an "S-curve", turning north from Fulton Street onto Crescent Street, then east onto Jamaica Avenue. The curves are at nearly 90-degree angles, forcing trains to drastically reduce speed to 15 miles per hour in order to traverse them. The line east of Cypress Hills is known as the Jamaica Avenue Line, the newest section of the line which was built under the Dual Contracts. This structure has provisions on its entire length for three tracks, but a center track was never built (see below), with the exception of a layup track at 111th Street and another between 160th Street and 168th Street on the now-demolished original end of the line.

Four curves on the line, including the two on the Jamaica Avenue "S-curve", are among the 30 sharpest curves in the subway system. The curve west of Marcy Avenue has radii of 175 and 190 feet (53 and 58 m) for Manhattan- and Queens-bound trains, respectively. The curve from Broadway Junction to Alabama Avenue has a radius of 175 feet (53 m). The curve east of Crescent Street has radii of 175 and 180 feet (53 and 55 m) and the curve west of Cypress Hills has radii of 210 and 200 feet (64 and 61 m), both respectively for Manhattan- and Queens-bound trains. As with other BMT Eastern Division lines, the Jamaica Line can only accommodate trains with eight 60-foot-long (18 m) or eight 67-foot-long (20 m) cars. Due to the narrow turning radiuses of the lines, 75-foot-long (23 m) cars (R44, R46, R68, R68A) could not be used on the Eastern Division.

== History ==
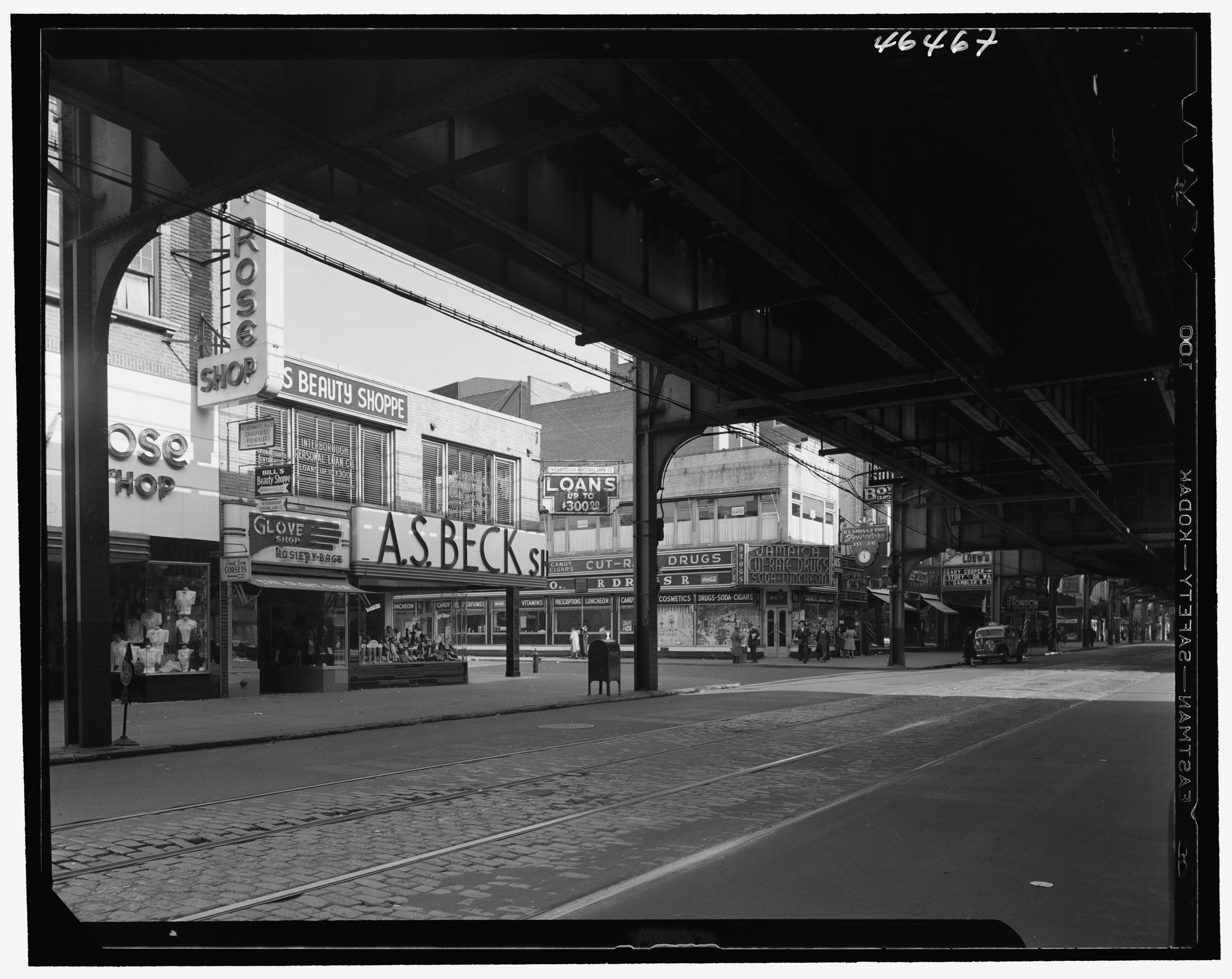
The Jamaica Line seen in the 1940s

The Union Elevated Railroad, leased to the Brooklyn Elevated Railroad, opened an elevated line above Broadway from Gates Avenue northwest to Driggs Avenue in Williamsburg on June 25, 1888. This was a branch of the existing Lexington Avenue Elevated, which then ended at Van Siclen Avenue; Broadway trains ran between Driggs and Van Siclen Avenues. A popular free transfer was available at Gates Avenue to Lexington Avenue trains towards Downtown Brooklyn. The Broadway Elevated was extended to Broadway Ferry on July 14, 1888.

An extension of the Broadway Elevated east to Cypress Hills, over Fulton Street and Crescent Street, opened on May 30, 1893, and the company extended both Lexington Avenue and Broadway trains to the new terminal. This extension incorporated portions of the recently demolished Park Avenue Elevated. On May 30, 1903, a connection between the Broadway Elevated and trolley tracks was completed south of the Cypress Hills terminal. Known as the Cypress Hills Incline, it allowed trains to run to 168th Street in Jamaica via Jamaica Avenue. This service was discontinued on December 30, 1903, due to traffic congestion in Jamaica.

A connection to the Williamsburg Bridge was established in 1908, rendering the two westernmost stations on the Broadway Ferry Branch obsolete. These two stations were closed on July 3, 1916. The eastern extension along Jamaica Avenue to 168th Street was opened on July 3, 1918.

Joint service with the Long Island Rail Road's Atlantic Branch existed between Norwood Avenue and Crescent Street stations with a connection built at Chestnut Street in Brooklyn. This allowed BRT trains to access the Rockaways and Manhattan Beach, while affording the LIRR a connection into Manhattan to the BRT terminal located at Park Row over the Brooklyn Bridge (this service predated the opening of the East River Tunnels to Penn Station). This service ended in 1917 when the United States Railroad Administration took over the LIRR, and classified different operating standards between rapid transit trains and regular heavy rail railroads such as the LIRR. In Fiscal Year 1930, the platforms at Kosciuszko Street were lengthened to accommodate an eight-car train of Standard subway cars.

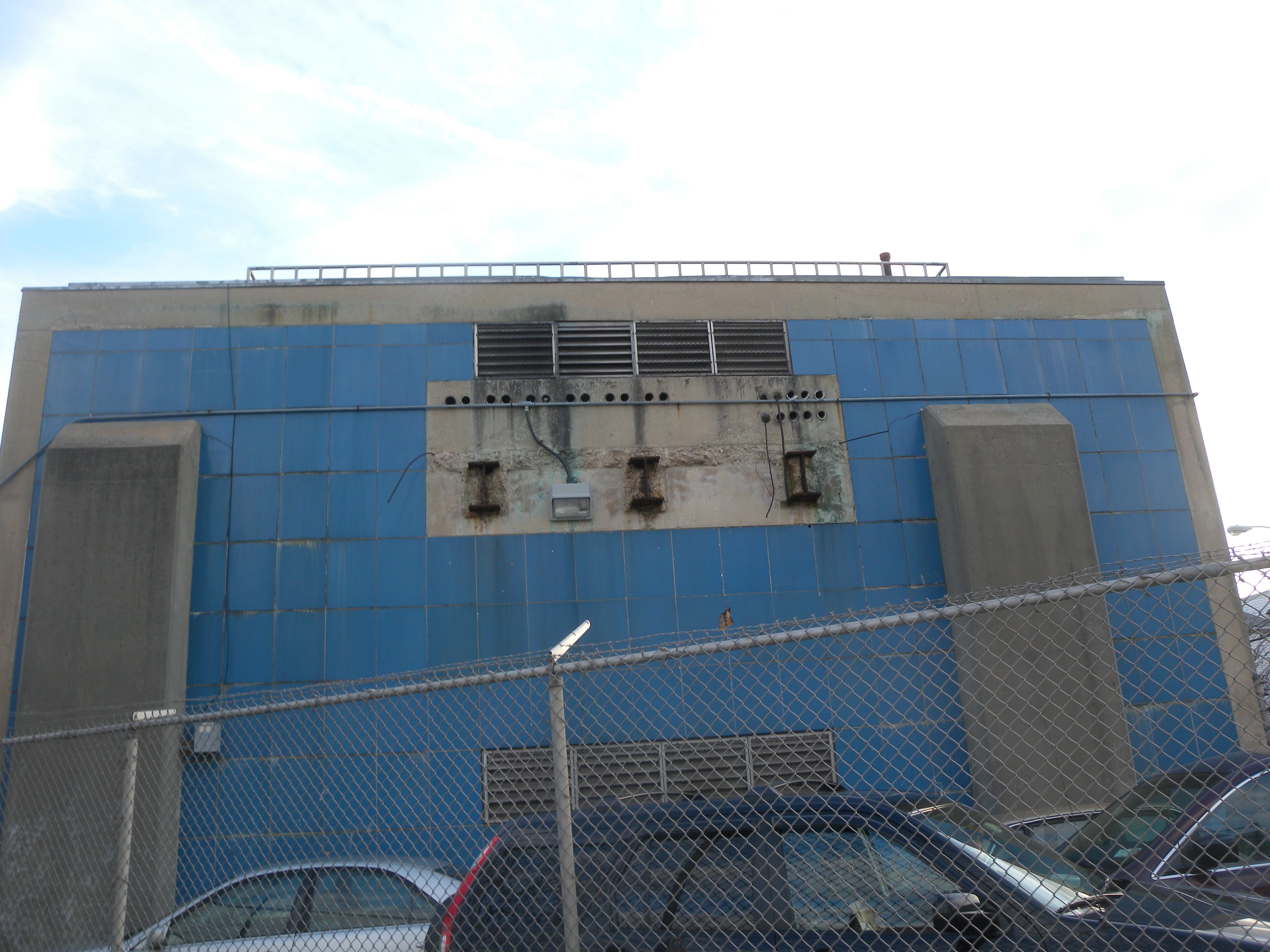
Power substation at 144th Place adjacent to a former section of the elevated tracks

By the time the Independent Subway System extended the Queens Boulevard Line along Hillside Avenue in Jamaica in 1937, residents became dissatisfied with the Jamaica Elevated. Construction of the Archer Avenue subway lines began in 1973. However, the city was hit by a major financial crisis during the mid-1970s delaying the completion and opening of the new line. Regardless of these circumstances and despite opposition from some area residents, the three easternmost stations (Sutphin Boulevard, 160th Street, and 168th Street) were closed on September 10, 1977, with most of that segment of the line being demolished by 1979. The two other stations west of that point (Metropolitan Avenue and Queens Boulevard) were closed in 1985, with the line there being demolished in 1990. The Archer Avenue subway was opened in 1988. Two remnants of the former Jamaica El in Jamaica itself still exist today: the 144th Place power substation, which is now used for the Archer Avenue subway, and the station house and tower for 168th Street, which can be found on the southeast corner of Jamaica Avenue and 165th Street and is now used as a Boston Market restaurant.

In 1986, the New York City Transit Authority launched a study to determine whether to close 79 stations on 11 routes, including the segment of the Jamaica Line east of Crescent Street, due to low ridership and high repair costs. Numerous figures, including New York City Council member Carol Greitzer, criticized the plans.

=== Eastern Jamaica Line third track proposals ===
On July 7, 1934, the Transit Commission ordered that the BMT construct a transformer in Woodhaven at 77th Street, which would provide more power, and therefore it would allow the construction of a third track on the Jamaica El.

In 1958, the New York City Transit Authority first proposed the installation of a third track on the Jamaica El to provide peak-direction express service. The 1958 plan would have eliminated two tight right-angle curves of the Crescent Street "S-curve" between the Jamaica Avenue and Fulton Street portions of the route, by building a new elevated structure that would run diagonally from 80th Street to about Grant or Nichols Avenues, just east of Crescent Street. A 50- to 75-foot-wide right-of-way would have been needed, and since the line would have cut diagonally across several streets, 75 homes were slated to be torn down. Since the new elevated structure would take a more direct route, some local stations would be eliminated. The stops at Cypress Hills and Elderts Lane would have been eliminated, and a new stop replacing them would have been built around 75th Street and either Rockaway Boulevard or 91st Avenue. As part of the 1959 capital budget of the Transit Authority, $25.25 million was allocated for the construction of a third track on the Jamaica Elevated from 160th Street to Alabama Avenue. The stations from Alabama Avenue to and including Crescent Street are: Alabama Avenue, Van Siclen Avenue, Cleveland Street, Norwood Avenue and Crescent Street. All of these stations have center island platforms; to allow for the construction of a third track, the current platforms would have been demolished and replaced with side platforms. The Alabama Avenue and Van Siclen Avenue stops would be replaced by one stop in between the two stations to allow for better spacing, 0.5 miles (0.80 km), between stations. The Cleveland Street station would have been replaced with a new station west of the existing station. The Norwood Avenue and Crescent Street stations would have been replaced by a single station between the two stations. One alternative that would not have required the demolition of homes would have entailed replacing the elevated structure between Eastern Parkway and Cypress Hills with a new structure above Jamaica Avenue, with new stops built.

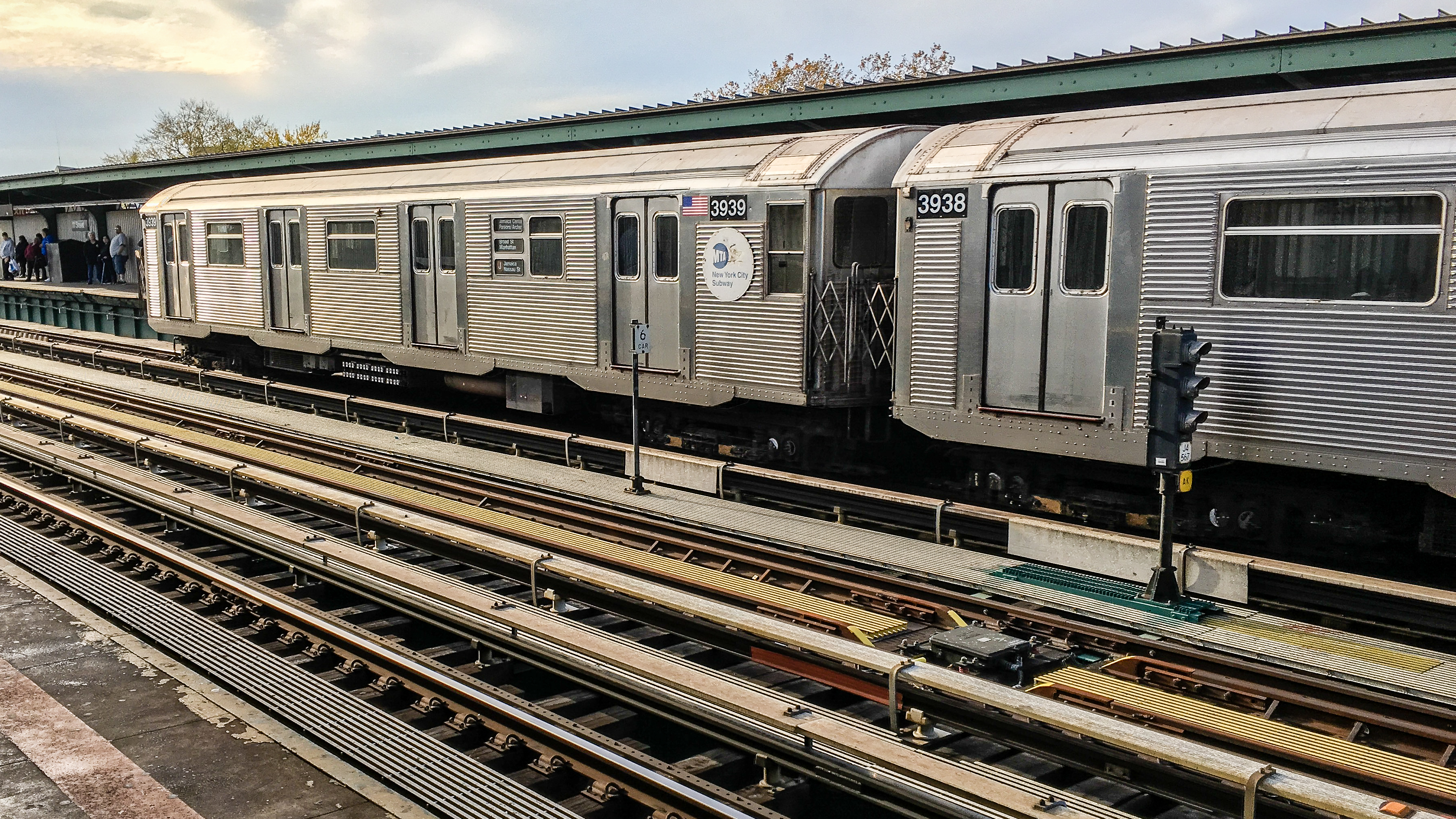
111th Street, the only station on the Jamaica Line east of Broadway Junction with three tracks

On October 9, 1958, because of a lack of funds and because of community opposition, the City Planning Commission removed the project from the capital outlay budget. On July 14, 1959, the third-track project was put into the New York City Transit Authority's 1960 budget. On August 18, 1959, the New York City Transit Authority through an appeal made by the Authority's chairman, Patterson, tried to obtain approval from the City Planning Commission for a $27 million project to construct a third track on the BMT Jamaica Line. The installation of the third track would have attracted passengers from the overcrowded IND Queens Boulevard Line, as there would be significant time savings between 168th Street and Marcy Avenue. The Planning Commission killed the plan in the prior year, because of insufficient evidence that there was a need for such a project.

On June 18, 1959, skip-stop service was implemented on the Jamaica El, with trains stopping at alternate stations between 168th Street and Eastern Parkway with the hope of enticing riders from the IND Queens Boulevard Line to use the new skip-stop service. If skip-stop service was a success, the Transit Authority would have shelved the triple-tracking project.

The project, as it was planned in 1962, would have necessitated the condemnation of about 200 homes and would have cost $35 million. The only express stop between 168th Street and Eastern Parkway would have been Woodhaven Boulevard, which would have needed to be reconstructed to allow for express platforms to be built. The project had serious community opposition, with the district leader of the 13th Assembly District, Arthur A. Gray, saying that the project was "an unnecessary and unwarranted renovation of an antiquated elevated structure in which the transportation needs of our community are sacrificed for the convenience of the many Nassau residents who board the line at its Jamaica terminus." The project was thought as becoming worthless in a few years, as Jamaica was planned to become a big shopping center, and therefore, the el would have had to come down. Suggestions were made to raze the elevated in this section to allow for a shopping mall in Woodhaven. The City Planning Commission continued to oppose the project on the grounds of the "inadequacies of the project".

The NYCTA once again requested for funds for the third-tracking of the Jamaica Line for its 1965–1966 fiscal year. This time the projected cost would have been reduced to $16.45 million. In November 1967, William Ronan, chairman of the Metropolitan Commuter Transportation Authority, and later the chairman of the Metropolitan Transportation Authority, suggested that money from a transportation bond issue could have paid for the installment of the third track on the line.

== Service patterns ==
The following services use part or all of the BMT Jamaica Line:

	Time period				Section of line
	Rush hours	Middays	Evenings and weekends	Late nights	Section of line
"J" train	express west of Myrtle Avenue in peak direction; skip-stop east of Myrtle Avenue	express west of Myrtle Avenue in peak direction, local elsewhere	all stops		entire line
"Z" train	express west of Myrtle Avenue in peak direction; skip-stop east of Myrtle Avenue	no service			entire line
"M" train	local			Myrtle Avenue only	west of Myrtle Avenue

The line has had two major service patterns: the 14 Broadway (Brooklyn) Line (earlier called the Canarsie Line, before that line was connected to the 14th Street Line) and the 15 Jamaica Line. Eventually, the 14 became the KK (which became the K in 1974) and the 15 the J; the K was eliminated in 1976. The Z was introduced in 1988 to provide skip-stop service with the J, using the same pattern that the 14/K and 15/J formerly used in multiple instances throughout their history.

== Nomenclature ==
From its acquisition by the BRT to city ownership in 1940, the portion of the line from its western terminus to Cypress Hills was known as the Broadway El or the Broadway Line. Past 1940, the line was known as the Broadway (Brooklyn) Line to distinguish from the underground Broadway Line in Manhattan. Beyond that point it was known as the Jamaica Avenue El or the Jamaica Line. Subsequent to city takeover, the dividing line between the Broadway and Jamaica Avenue Lines was often considered to be the more westerly station at Eastern Parkway, now known as Broadway Junction.

The Brooklyn–Manhattan Transit Corporation (BMT) originally operated the line with "westbound" trains heading toward Manhattan and "eastbound" trains heading toward Canarsie, Middle Village, or Jamaica, generally in agreement with compass direction. However, NYCT's railroad directions, which are north and south, replaced the BMT's west and east railroad directions, respectively. This reclassification resulted in services which ran through the BMT Nassau Street Line to Downtown Brooklyn having two south ends. To eliminate any confusion, the directions of train services in the eastern division were switched, with trains running towards Jamaica being considered Northbound. The KK (later K) and current M services were an exception to this, with Jamaica, Broadway Junction, or Metropolitan Avenue remaining the south terminal, since they used the Chrystie Street Connection from the Jamaica Line to the IND Sixth Avenue Line.

== Station listing ==
Station service legend
Stops all times	Stops 24 hours a day
Stops all times except late nights	Stops every day during daytime hours only
Stops weekdays during the day	Stops during weekday daytime hours only
Stops all times except rush hours in the peak direction	Stops 24 hours a day, except during weekday rush hours in the peak direction
Stops rush hours in the peak direction only	Stops during weekday rush hours in the peak direction only
Time period details
Disabled access	Station is compliant with the Americans with Disabilities Act
↑	Station is compliant with the Americans with Disabilities Act in the indicated direction only
↓	Station is compliant with the Americans with Disabilities Act in the indicated direction only
	Elevator access to mezzanine only

Neighborhood (approximate)	Disabled access	Station	Tracks	Services	Opened	Transfers and notes
Queens
Jamaica	Demolished section of original line					
Jamaica		168th Street			July 3, 1918	Closed September 10, 1977, replaced by Q49 bus. Bus abandoned December 11, 1988.
Jamaica		160th Street			July 3, 1918	Closed September 10, 1977, replaced by Q49 bus. Bus abandoned December 11, 1988.
Jamaica		Sutphin Boulevard			July 3, 1918	Closed September 10, 1977, replaced by Q49 bus. Bus abandoned December 11, 1988.
Jamaica		Queens Boulevard			July 3, 1918	Closed April 15, 1985, replaced by Q49 bus. Bus abandoned December 11, 1988.
Jamaica		Metropolitan Avenue			July 3, 1918	Closed April 15, 1985, replaced by Q49 bus. Bus abandoned December 11, 1988.
Begins as continuation of BMT Archer Avenue Line (J Z )
Richmond Hill		121st Street	all	J Z	July 3, 1918	Q10 and Q80 buses to JFK Airport
Richmond Hill		111th Street	all	J	May 28, 1917	
Richmond Hill		104th Street	all	J Z	May 28, 1917	Earlier 102nd Street
Woodhaven	Disabled access	Woodhaven Boulevard	all	J Z	May 28, 1917	Q52/Q53 Select Bus Service
Woodhaven		85th Street–Forest Parkway	all	J	May 28, 1917	Earlier Forest Parkway
Woodhaven		75th Street–Elderts Lane	all	J Z	May 28, 1917	Earlier Elderts Lane
Brooklyn
Cypress Hills		Cypress Hills	all	J	May 30, 1893	
Cypress Hills		Crescent Street	all	J Z	May 30, 1893	
Cypress Hills		Norwood Avenue	all	J Z	May 30, 1893	
Cypress Hills		Cleveland Street	all	J	May 30, 1893	Earlier Cleveland Avenue
East New York		Van Siclen Avenue	all	J Z	December 3, 1885	
East New York		Alabama Avenue	all	J Z	September 5, 1885	
East New York	Connecting tracks to East New York Yard					
East New York	Center express track begins (no regular service)					
East New York	Merge to local tracks with connection from BMT Canarsie Line (no regular service)					
East New York		Broadway Junction	all	J Z	June 14, 1885	A C (IND Fulton Street Line); L (BMT Canarsie Line); Connection to LIRR at East New York; Earlier Manhattan Beach Crossing or Manhattan Junction or Eastern Parkway
Connecting track to East New York Yard
Bedford–Stuyvesant/ Bushwick		Chauncey Street	local	J Z	July 18, 1885	
Bedford–Stuyvesant/ Bushwick		Halsey Street	local	J	August 19, 1885	
Bedford–Stuyvesant/ Bushwick		Gates Avenue	local	J Z	May 13, 1885	
Bedford–Stuyvesant/ Bushwick		Kosciuszko Street	local	J	June 25, 1888	B46 Select Bus Service
Bedford–Stuyvesant/ Bushwick	Merge from BMT Myrtle Avenue Line (M )					
Bedford–Stuyvesant/ Bushwick		Myrtle Avenue	all	J M Z	June 25, 1888	originally at Stuyvesant Avenue, moved for the Myrtle Avenue Elevated transfer by April 1889
Bedford–Stuyvesant/ Bushwick		Park Avenue			June 25, 1888	Closed June 5, 1916
Williamsburg	Disabled access	Flushing Avenue	local	J M	June 25, 1888	B15 bus to JFK Int'l Airport
Williamsburg		Lorimer Street	local	J M	June 25, 1888	
Williamsburg		Hewes Street	local	J M	June 25, 1888	
Williamsburg	Crossovers to local tracks (J Z )					
Williamsburg	Disabled access	Marcy Avenue	local	J M Z	June 25, 1888	B44 SBS
Williamsburg	Center express track ends as stub within Marcy Ave station					
Continues over Williamsburg Bridge and becomes the BMT Nassau Street Line (J M Z)
Williamsburg	Demolished section of original line					
Williamsburg		Driggs Avenue			June 25, 1888	Closed July 3, 1916
Williamsburg		Broadway Ferry			July 14, 1888	Closed July 3, 1916
