= 85th Street–Forest Parkway station =

New York City Subway station in Queens

85 Street–Forest Parkway
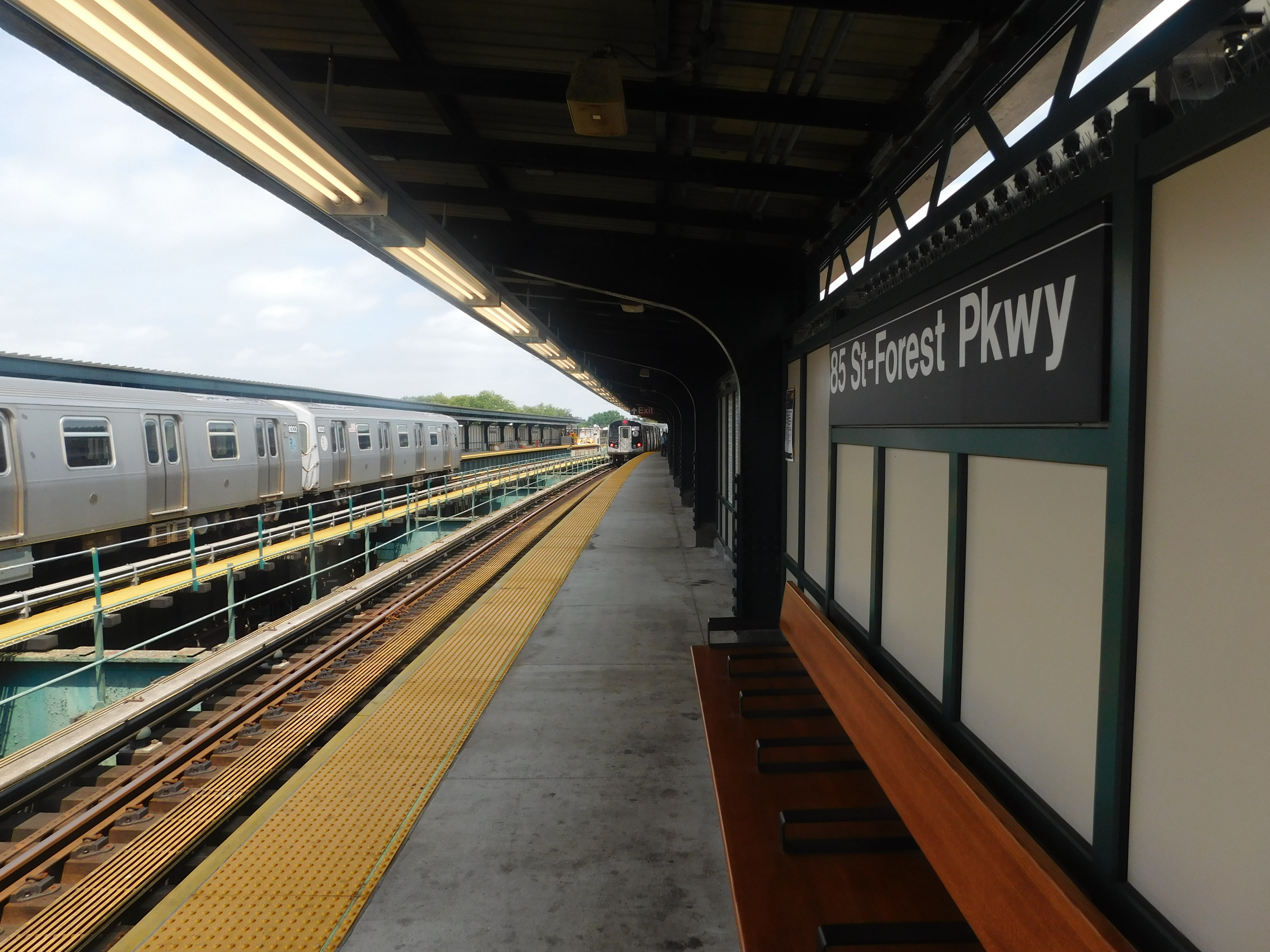
- Jamaica-bound platform

Station statistics
- Address: 85th Street and Jamaica Avenue; Queens, New York
- Borough: Queens
- Locale: Woodhaven
- Coordinates: 40.692418°N 73.86014°W
- Division: B (BMT)
- Line: BMT Jamaica Line
- Services: J (all times)
- Transit: NYCT Bus: Q56
- Structure: Elevated
- Platforms: 2 side platforms
- Tracks: 2

Other information
- Opened: May 28, 1917 (109 years ago)
- Former/other names: Forest Parkway

Traffic
- 2025: 565,866 ▼16.6%
- Rank: 382 out of 423
Services
| Preceding station | New York City Subway | Following station |
|---|---|---|
| Cypress Hills J skip-stop | J/Z (New York City Subway service) | Woodhaven Boulevard J toward Jamaica Center–York College |
| 75th Street–Elderts Lane J toward Broad Street | J/Z (New York City Subway service) | Woodhaven Boulevard J toward Jamaica Center–York College |
does not stop here
Location
Location within New York City Subway
Location within New York City
Location within New York
Track layout
Street map
Station service legend
| Symbol | Description |
| Stops all times except rush hours in the peak direction | Stops all times except rush hours in the peak direction |
| Stops rush hours in the peak direction only | Stops rush hours in the peak direction only |
| Stops all times | Stops all times |

The 85th Street–Forest Parkway station is a skip-stop station on the BMT Jamaica Line of the New York City Subway, located on Jamaica Avenue in Woodhaven, Queens. The J train serves this station at all times. The Z train skips this station when it operates.

== History ==
This station opened on May 28, 1917 under the Brooklyn Union Elevated Railroad, an affiliate of the Brooklyn Rapid Transit Company.

From the late-1950s into the 1960s the New York City Transit Authority had a proposal to realign the BMT Jamaica Line between Grant or Nichols Avenue (east of Crescent Street station) and 80th Street and Jamaica Avenue (just west of this station). This realignment would have also included a bi-directional express track. The realignment was never carried out. "85th Street" was added to the name in 1966.

In February 2023, the Metropolitan Transportation Authority announced that this station would temporarily close for renovations as part of a station renewal contract at four stations on the Jamaica Line. On August 12, 2024, the Queens-bound platform closed. The closure shifted to the Manhattan-bound platform in mid-January 2025. Work includes platform renewals, replacement of stairs, canopies, and windscreens, installation of artwork, and minimizing the gaps between the train and the platform edge. The work is being performed by Gramercy PJS Joint-Venture. The project was initially scheduled for completion in August 2025 but was later delayed to late 2026.

== Station layout ==
The station has two tracks and two side platforms, with space for a center track.

=== Exits ===
The north exit, which leads to 85th Street and has a crossunder, is near Forest Park. The south exit, which leads to Forest Parkway, was removed.
