= 104th Street station (BMT Jamaica Line) =

New York City Subway station in Queens

104 Street
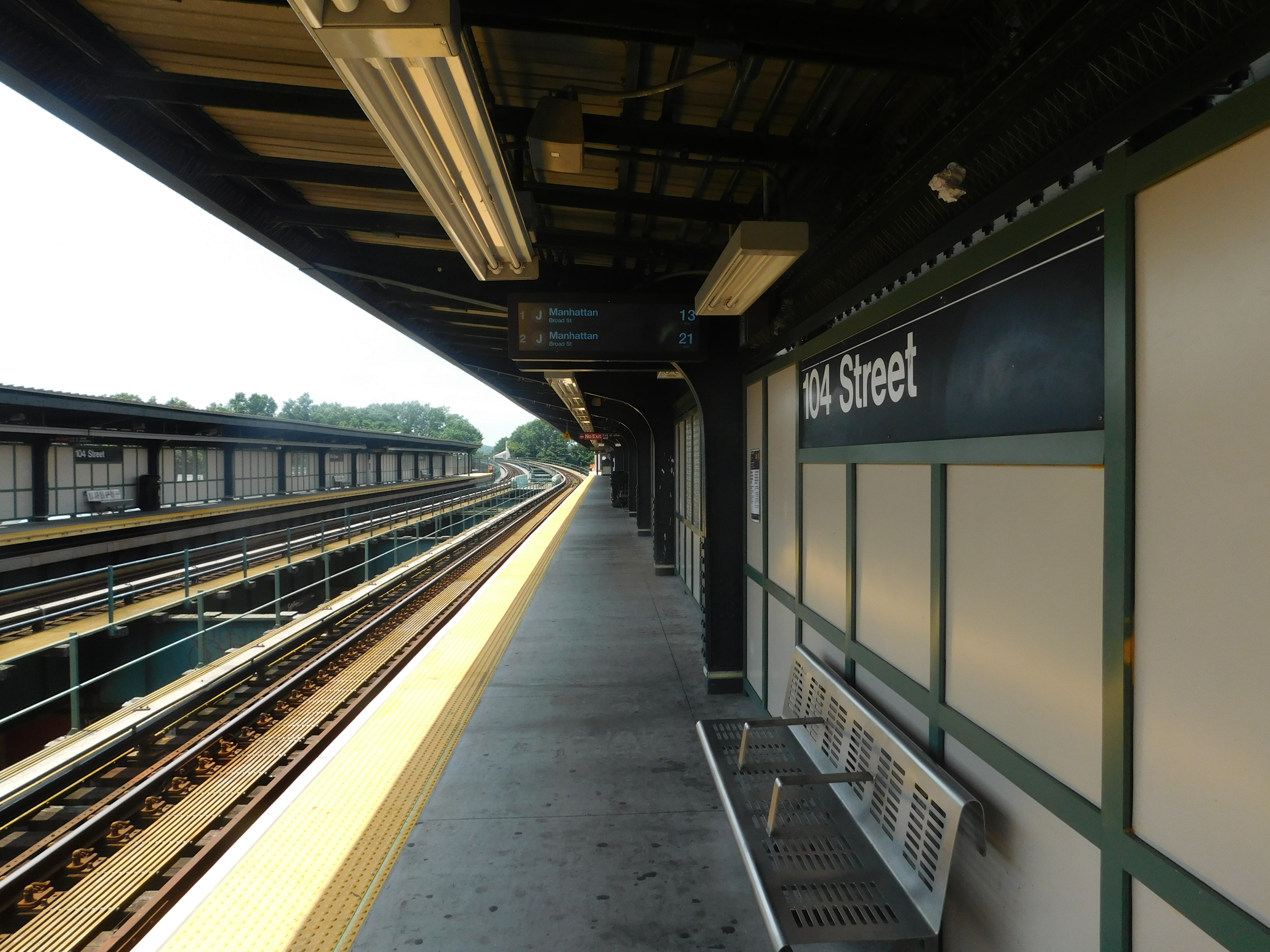
- Southbound platform

Station statistics
- Address: 104th Street and Jamaica Avenue; Queens, New York
- Borough: Queens
- Locale: Richmond Hill
- Coordinates: 40.695184°N 73.843231°W
- Division: B (BMT)
- Line: BMT Jamaica Line
- Services: J (all except rush hours, peak direction); Z (rush hours, peak direction)
- Transit: NYCT Bus: Q56
- Structure: Elevated
- Platforms: 2 side platforms
- Tracks: 2

Other information
- Opened: May 28, 1917; 109 years ago
- Former/other names: 102nd Street; 102nd–104th Streets; 104th–102nd Streets

Traffic
- 2025: 600,040 ▲0.1%
- Rank: 372 out of 423
Services
Preceding station	New York City Subway	Following station
Woodhaven Boulevard J Z toward Broad Street	J/Z (New York City Subway service)	121st Street Z skip-stop
Woodhaven Boulevard J Z toward Broad Street	J/Z (New York City Subway service)	111th Street J toward Jamaica Center–York College
Location
Location within New York City Subway
Location within New York City
Location within New York
Track layout
Street map
Station service legend
Symbol	Description
Stops all times except rush hours in the peak direction	Stops all times except rush hours in the peak direction
Stops rush hours in the peak direction only	Stops rush hours in the peak direction only
Stops all times	Stops all times

The 104th Street station is a skip-stop station on the BMT Jamaica Line of the New York City Subway, located on Jamaica Avenue between 102nd and 104th Streets in Richmond Hill, Queens. It is served by the J train at all times except rush hours in the peak direction, when the Z train takes over service.

== History ==
This station opened on May 28, 1917 under the Brooklyn Union Elevated Railroad, an affiliate of the Brooklyn Rapid Transit Company. The former Brooklyn Manor station on the LIRR's defunct Rockaway Beach Branch, which was closed in 1962, is two blocks to the west and could be an available transfer if the Rockaway Beach Branch is reopened for train service.

Until 1966, this station was known as 102nd Street. It was then given the dual name of 102nd–104th Streets. As of 2011, station signage and the official map give the station name as 104th Street.

The Manhattan-bound platform of this station was closed for renovation from March 13, 2017, until April 11, 2018, delayed from summer 2017. The Jamaica Center-bound platform of the station closed on July 23, 2018, for repairs, and reopened to the public on December 21, 2018.

== Station layout ==
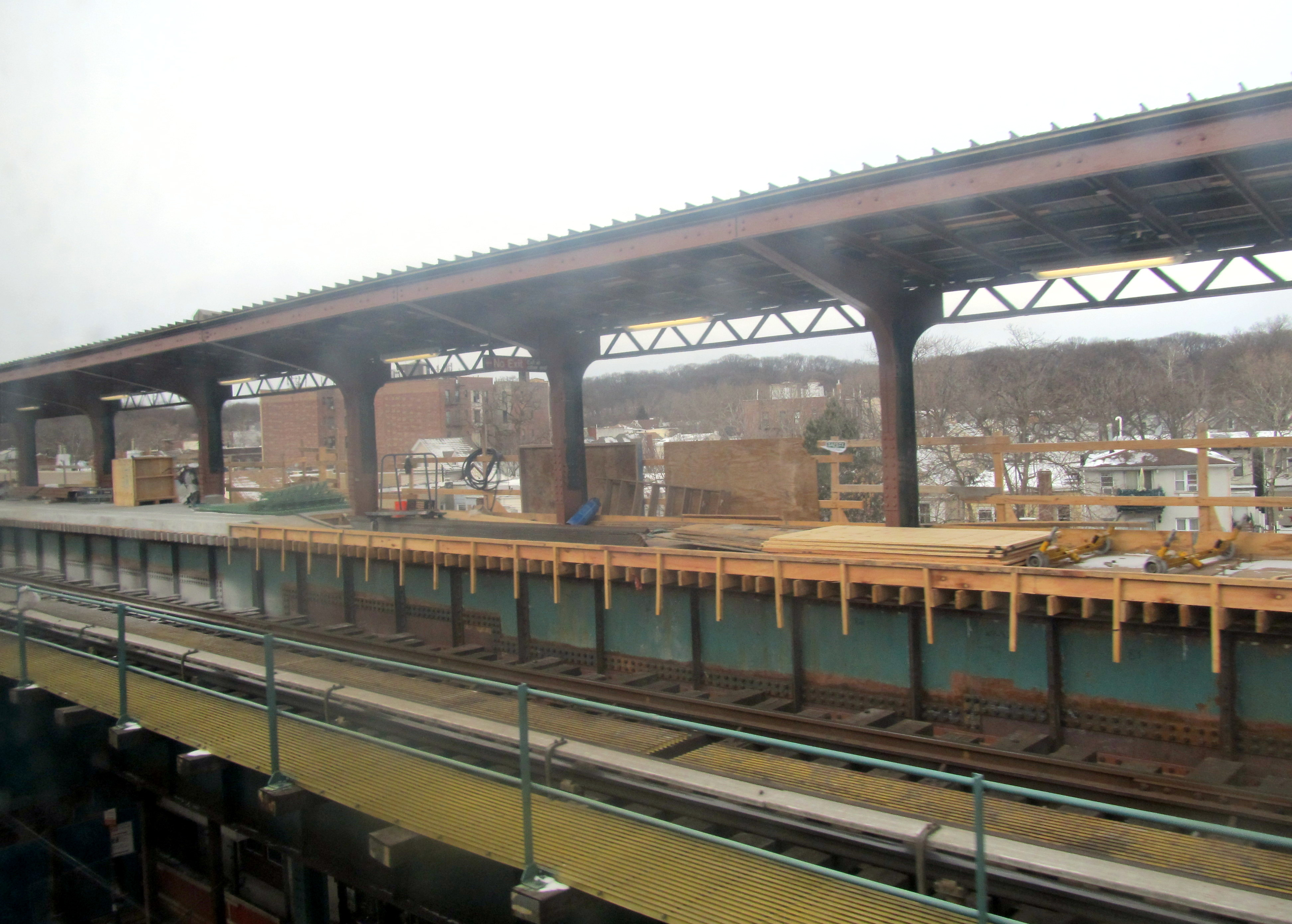
Manhattan-bound platform under reconstruction in 2017

This elevated station has two tracks and two side platforms, but there is room for a center track. Both platforms have beige windscreens and brown canopies with green frames and support columns for their entire length except for a small section at either end. Here, there are only waist-high steel fences with lampposts. The station signs are in the standard black name plate with white lettering.

The 1990 artwork is called Points of Observation by Kathleen McCarthy. It is a face-shaped wire mesh sculpture that affords a view of the street from the platforms. The artwork also appears at 111th Street and at Woodhaven Blvd.

=== Exits ===
This station has one active station house beneath the platforms near the east end. A single staircase from each platform goes down to a waiting area/crossunder, where a turnstile bank provides access to and from the station. Outside fare control, there is a token booth and two staircases to the street. One faces south and goes down to the southeast corner of 104th Street and Jamaica Avenue while the other faces west and goes down to the north side of Jamaica Avenue near the northwest corner of 104th Street. The station house has concrete flooring and windscreens going halfway up the platform stairs.

This station formerly had another mezzanine at 102nd Street. The station house and stairs to the street have been removed, all that remains is the ceiling and some support I-Beams.
