= Woodhaven Boulevard station (BMT Jamaica Line) =

New York City Subway station in Queens

Woodhaven Blvd
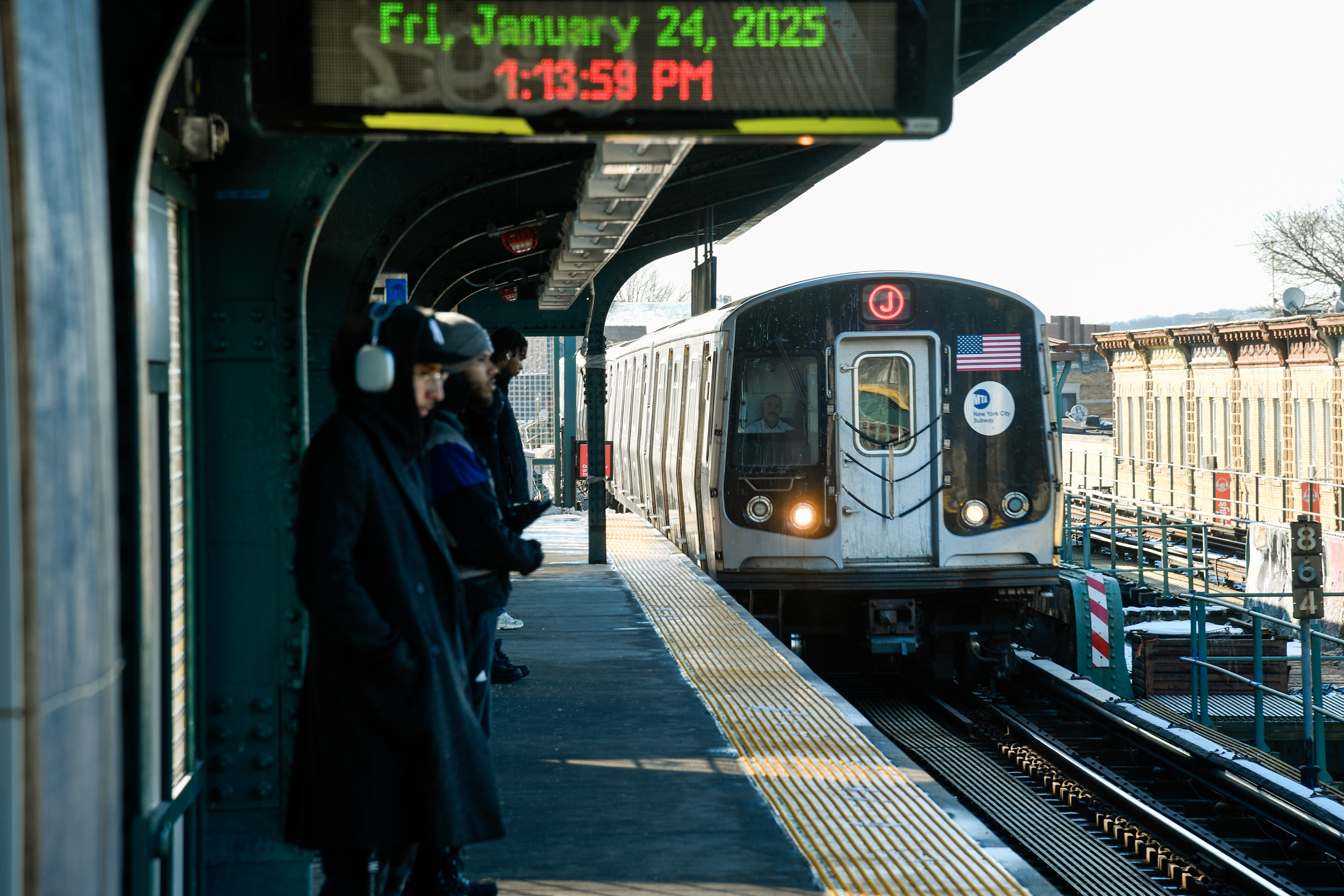
- R179 J train entering the station

Station statistics
- Address: Woodhaven Boulevard and Jamaica Avenue; Queens, New York
- Borough: Queens
- Locale: Woodhaven
- Coordinates: 40.693622°N 73.852158°W
- Division: B (BMT)
- Line: BMT Jamaica Line
- Services: J (all times); Z (rush hours, peak direction)
- Transit: NYCT Bus: Q56; MTA Bus: Q11, Q52/Q53 SBS, QM15
- Structure: Elevated
- Platforms: 2 side platforms
- Tracks: 2

Other information
- Opened: May 28, 1917 (109 years ago)
- Rebuilt: February 27, 2023–January 24, 2025
- Accessible: Yes

Traffic
- 2025: 1,096,937 ▲96.1%
- Rank: 292 out of 423
Services
Preceding station	New York City Subway	Following station
75th Street–Elderts Lane Z skip-stop	J/Z (New York City Subway service)	104th Street J Z toward Jamaica Center–York College
85th Street–Forest Parkway J toward Broad Street	J/Z (New York City Subway service)	104th Street J Z toward Jamaica Center–York College
85th Street–Forest Parkway J toward Broad Street	J/Z (New York City Subway service)	111th Street J skip-stop
Location
Location within New York City Subway
Location within New York City
Location within New York
Track layout
Street map
Station service legend
Symbol	Description
Stops all times except rush hours in the peak direction	Stops all times except rush hours in the peak direction
Stops rush hours in the peak direction only	Stops rush hours in the peak direction only
Stops all times	Stops all times

The Woodhaven Boulevard station is an elevated station on the BMT Jamaica Line of the New York City Subway, located in Woodhaven, Queens. It is served by the J train at all times and the Z train during rush hours in the peak direction.

== History ==
This station opened on May 28, 1917 under the Brooklyn Union Elevated Railroad, an affiliate of the Brooklyn Rapid Transit Company.

As part of the Metropolitan Transportation Authority's 2015–2019 Capital Program, the Woodhaven Boulevard station was selected to receive elevators as part of a process to expand the New York City Subway system's accessibility. As of February 2021, funding had been committed to accessibility renovations at the Woodhaven Boulevard station. In December 2021, the MTA awarded a contract for the installation of elevators at eight stations, including the Woodhaven Boulevard station.

Additionally, as part of a separate project, the Metropolitan Transportation Authority announced in February 2023 that this station would be renovated as part of a station renewal contract at four stations on the Jamaica Line. Starting February 27 of that year, the eastbound platforms at this station and 75th Street-Elderts Lane were closed. The closure shifted to the Manhattan-bound platform at this station in December 2023, and work was completed on August 12, 2024. The work, performed by Gramercy PJS Joint-Venture, included platform renewals, replacement of stairs, canopies, and windscreens, installation of artwork, and minimizing the gaps between the train and the platform edge.

As of July 2022, the project to install two street-to-platform elevators at this station was scheduled to be completed in May 2024, but the elevators did not open until late January 2025. This project cost $140 million.

== Station layout ==
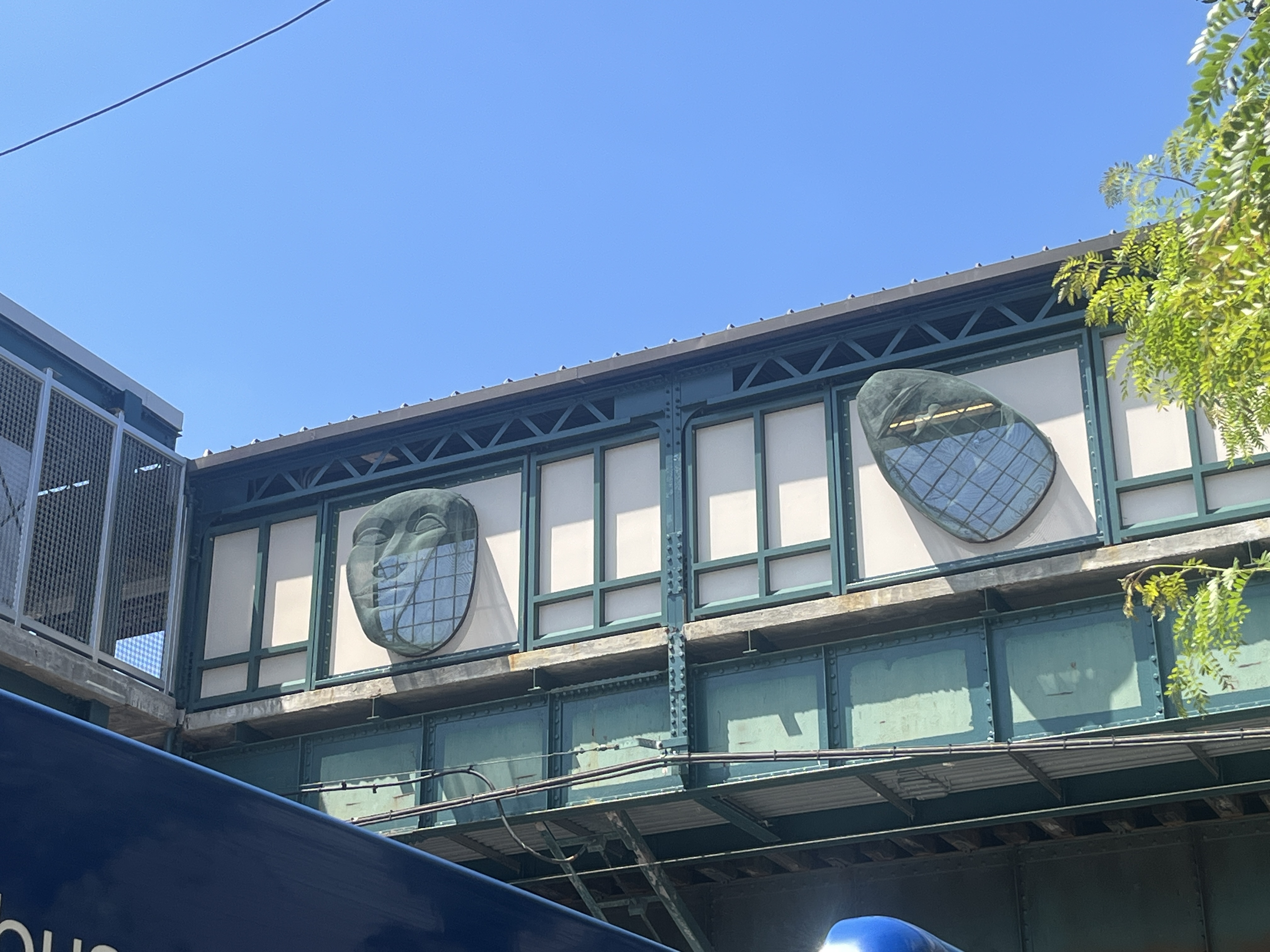
Points of Observation face sculptures, viewed from street level.

This elevated station has two tracks and two side platforms with space for a center track. Both platforms have beige windscreens and brown canopies with green roofs along the entire length except for a section at the west (railroad south) end. Here, there are only waist-high black steel fences.

This station has provisions built in its structure to convert it into an express station, if the center third track was to be installed. The other station on the line that had such provisions was the now demolished Sutphin Boulevard station. The 1990 artwork here is called Five Points of Observation by Kathleen McCarthy. It is a face-shaped wire mesh sculpture that affords a view of the street from the platforms. This artwork was also originally located on four other BMT Jamaica Line stations (Cypress Hills, 75th Street, 104th Street, 111th Street). McCarthy added onto the artwork in 2024 with laminated glassed windows. Additionally, two face sculptures (previously at Cypress Hills and 75th Street) have been relocated here.

=== Exits ===
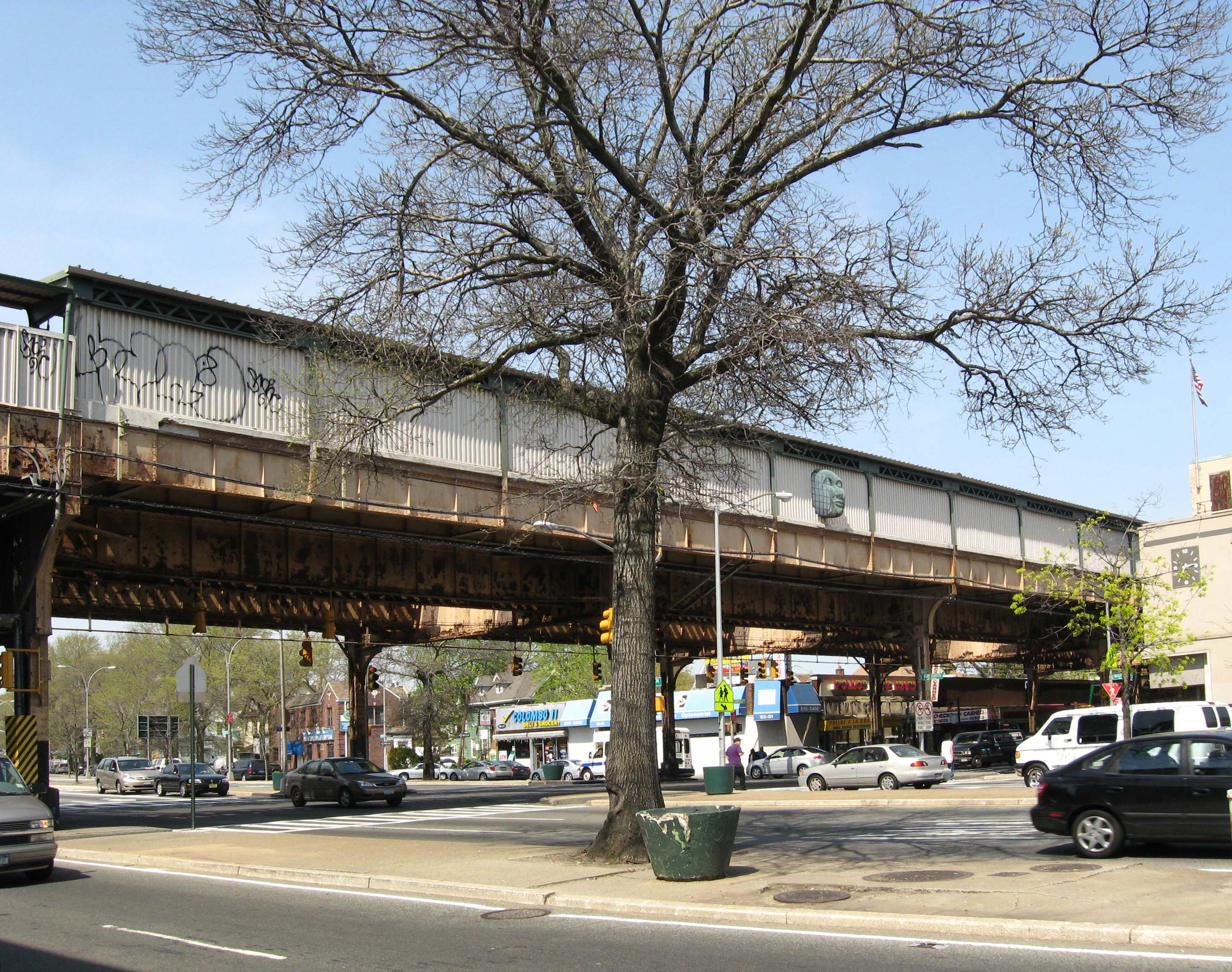
View of the station from Woodhaven Boulevard, looking northeast prior to renovation and elevator installation.

This station has two entrances/exits, both of which are elevated station houses beneath the tracks that allow free transfers between directions. The main one is at the extreme west end and has a single staircase from each platform, turnstile bank, token booth, and two street stairs going down to either western corners of Woodhaven Boulevard and Jamaica Avenue.

Fall 2026 view of Woodhaven Boulevard Station after renovations

The other station house is un-staffed, containing just two HEET turnstiles, a staircase to each platform, and one staircase going down to the southwest corner of 95th Street and Jamaica Avenue. The Queens-bound staircase's landing has an exit-only turnstile that allows passengers to exit the station without having to go through the station house.
