= Cypress Hills station =

New York City Subway station in Brooklyn

Cypress Hills
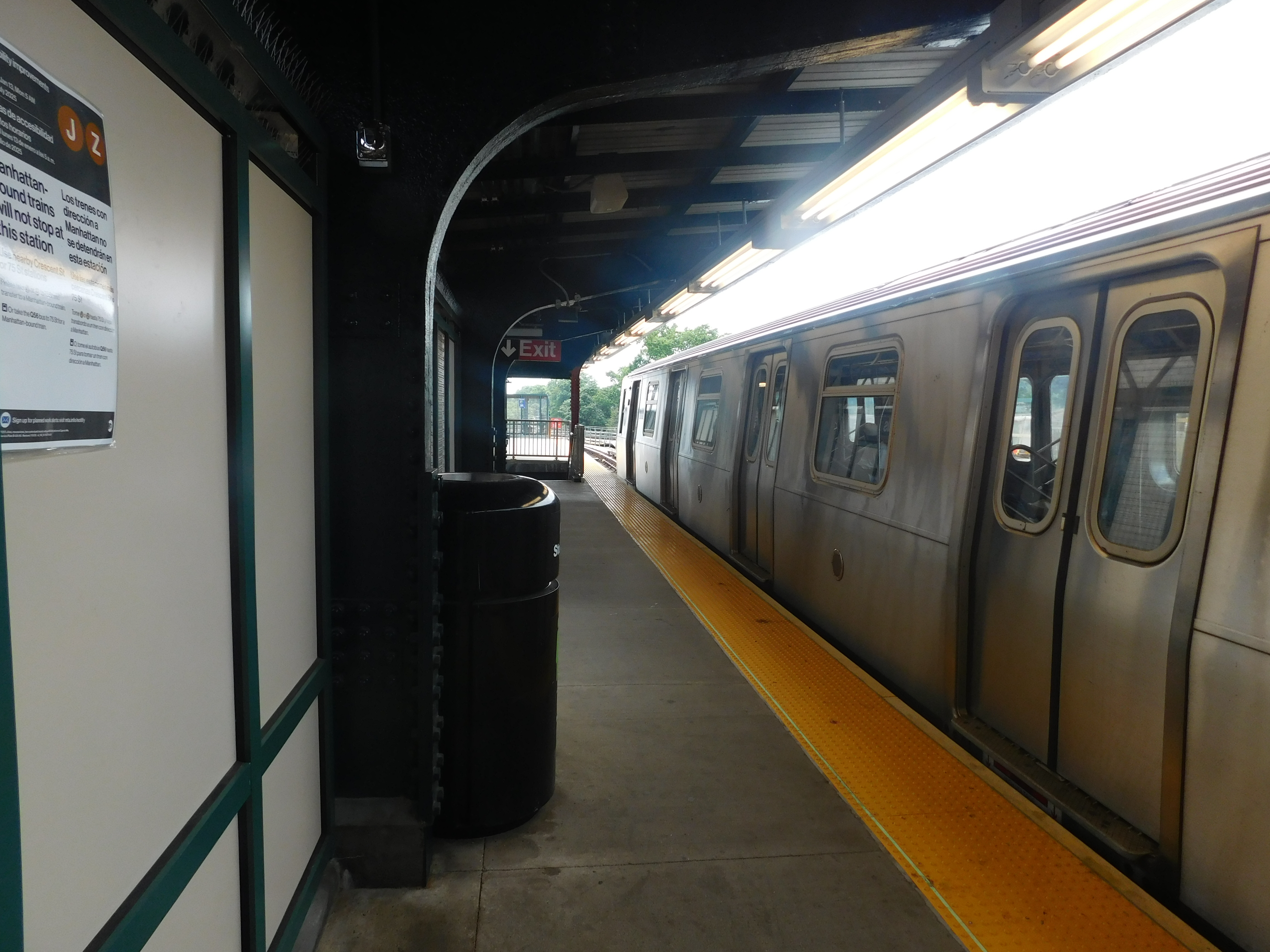
- R160 J train at the northbound platform

Station statistics
- Address: Hemlock Street and Jamaica Avenue; Brooklyn, New York
- Borough: Brooklyn
- Locale: Cypress Hills
- Coordinates: 40°41′23″N 73°52′23″W
- Division: B (BMT)
- Line: BMT Jamaica Line
- Services: J (all times)
- Transit: NYCT Bus: B13, Q56
- Structure: Elevated
- Platforms: 2 side platforms
- Tracks: 2

Other information
- Opened: May 30, 1893; 133 years ago
- Rebuilt: May 28, 1917; 109 years ago
- Accessible: No; planned
- Former/other names: Cypress Hills Cemetery; City Line

Traffic
- 2025: 165,887 ▼37.3%
- Rank: 416 out of 423
Services
Preceding station	New York City Subway	Following station
Crescent Street J toward Broad Street	J/Z (New York City Subway service)	85th Street–Forest Parkway J skip-stop
Crescent Street J toward Broad Street	J/Z (New York City Subway service)	75th Street–Elderts Lane J toward Jamaica Center–York College
does not stop here
Location
Location within New York City Subway
Location within New York City
Location within New York
Track layout
Street map
Station service legend
Symbol	Description
Stops all times except rush hours in the peak direction	Stops all times except rush hours in the peak direction
Stops rush hours in the peak direction only	Stops rush hours in the peak direction only
Stops all times	Stops all times

The Cypress Hills station is a skip-stop station on the BMT Jamaica Line of the New York City Subway, located on Jamaica Avenue in the Cypress Hills neighborhood of northeastern Brooklyn. It is served by the J train at all times. The Z train skips this station when it operates.

== History ==
This station was opened on May 30, 1893 as part of the Brooklyn Elevated Railroad's four stop extension of the Lexington Avenue Line to Cypress Hills. The original Cypress Hills station had two tracks and one island platform and was located along Crescent Street, reaching the cemetery. This station was the terminal for both the Jamaica Line and the BMT Lexington Avenue Line when it opened. It formerly had an island platform and stub-end located directly along Crescent Street just south of Jamaica Avenue that can still be seen approaching the cemetery east of the station.

The rebuilt station was constructed under the Dual Contracts and was opened on May 28, 1917. The rebuilt station has two tracks and two side platforms. The removal of the island platform resulted in a space between the tracks. This space would allow for an express third track, but one was never built.

On October 13, 1950, Lexington Avenue Line trains ceased to serve this station with that line's closure.

In February 2023, the Metropolitan Transportation Authority announced that this station would temporarily close for renovations as part of a station renewal contract at four stations on the Jamaica Line. On July 22, 2024, the Queens-bound platform closed. The closure shifted to the Manhattan-bound platform in mid-January 2025. Work includes platform renewals, replacement of stairs, canopies, and windscreens, installation of artwork, and minimizing the gaps between the train and the platform edge. The work is being performed by Gramercy PJS Joint-Venture. As part of its 2025–2029 Capital Program, the MTA has proposed making the station wheelchair-accessible in compliance with the Americans with Disabilities Act of 1990.

== Station layout ==
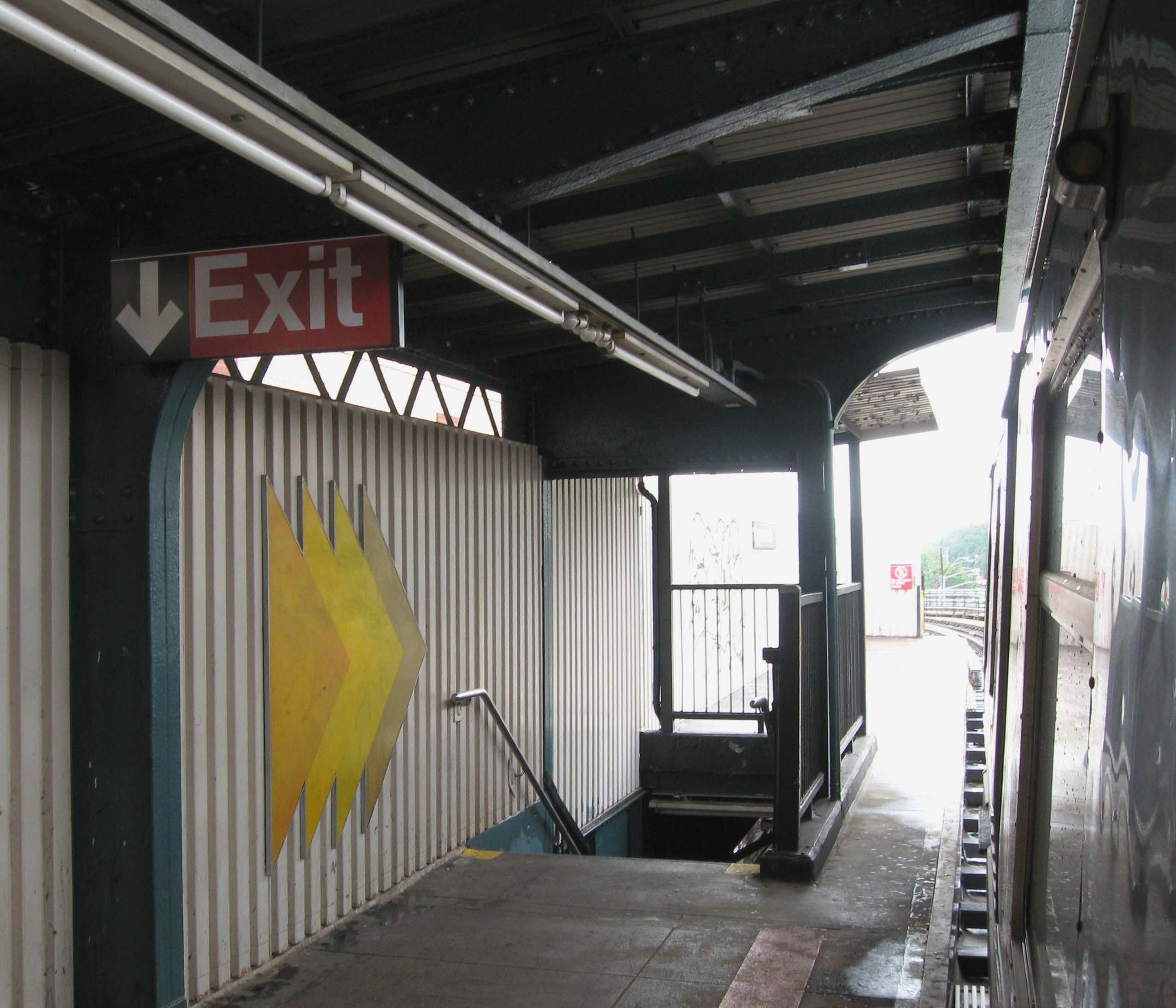
South end of northbound platform

It is the easternmost station in Brooklyn on the BMT Jamaica Line, since the next stop, 75th Street–Elderts Lane, is in Queens. Both platforms have beige windscreens and green canopies with brown roofs that run along the entire length. Just west of this station are two sharp curves that trains must navigate at less than 15 miles per hour (24 km/h). For this reason, a train must take more time to transverse this section than other sections of the line.

The 1990 artwork here is called Five Points of Observation, by Kathleen McCarthy. It affords a view of the street from the platforms and resembles a face when seen from the street. This artwork is also located in four other stations on the Jamaica Line.

=== Exits ===
The station's main entrance is at the south end. A single staircase from each platform leads to an elevated station house beneath the tracks. Inside are three turnstiles and a token booth. Outside of fare control, two street stairs lead to the corners of Hemlock and Crescent Streets.

On the north end of each platform, a single staircase leads to a landing outside of a now closed station house. On the Queens-bound platform, a single exit-only turnstile provides exit from the system and a street stair perpendicular to the line leads to Autumn Avenue, which ends at Jamaica Avenue. The exit on the Manhattan-bound platform was closed, and the street stair was removed.
