= Rockaway Parkway =

Avenue in Brooklyn, New York

- East 97th Street
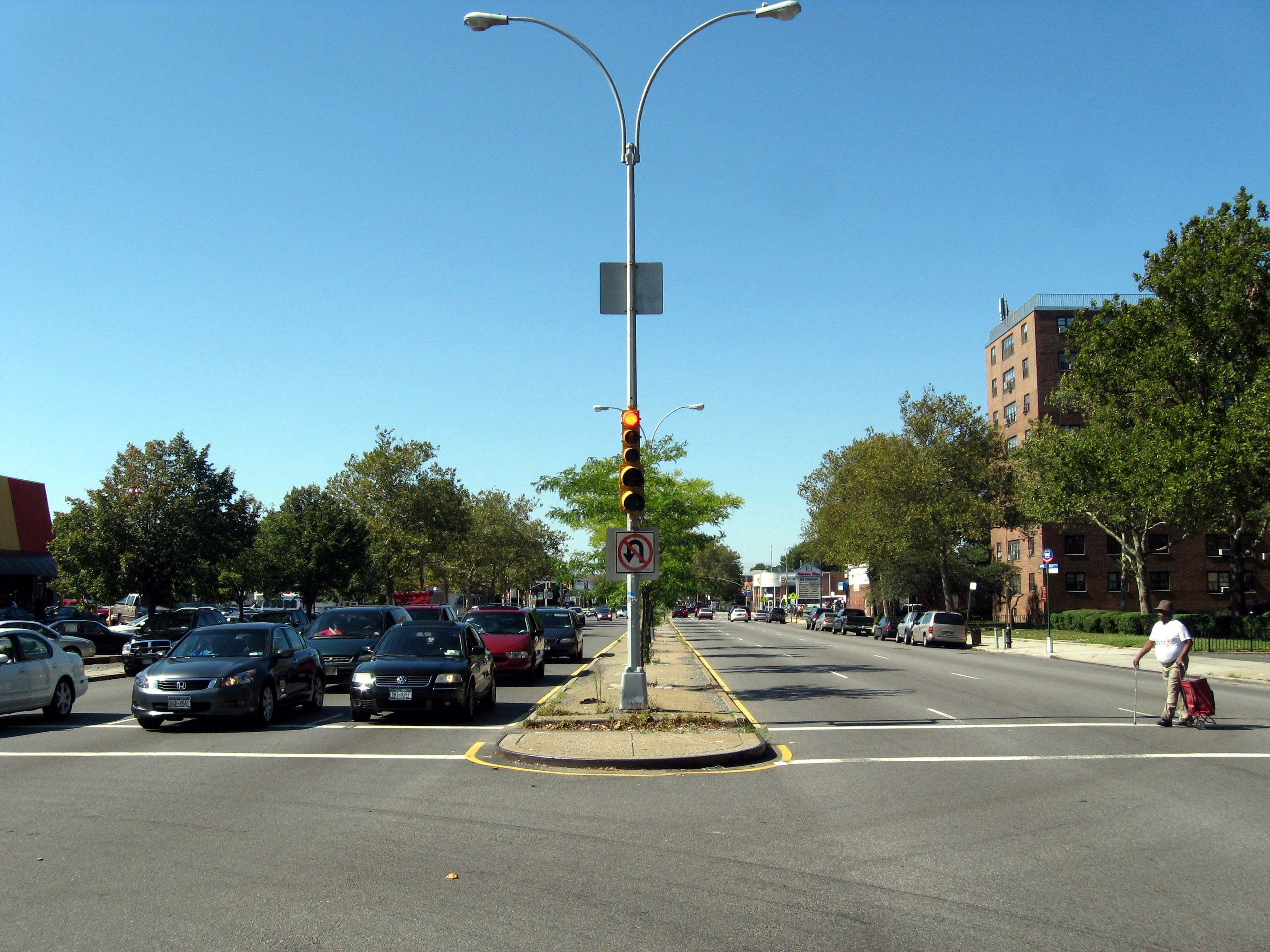
- Rockaway Parkway at Skidmore Avenue.
- Interactive map of Rockaway Parkway
- Maintained by: New York City Department of Transportation
- Location: Brooklyn, New York, U.S.
- Postal code: 11212, 11236
- Coordinates: 40°38′56″N 73°54′24″W
- North end: East New York Avenue
- Major junctions: Linden Boulevard; Flatlands Avenue
- South end: Canarsie Pier (Jamaica Bay)

Construction
- Commissioned: c. 18th century

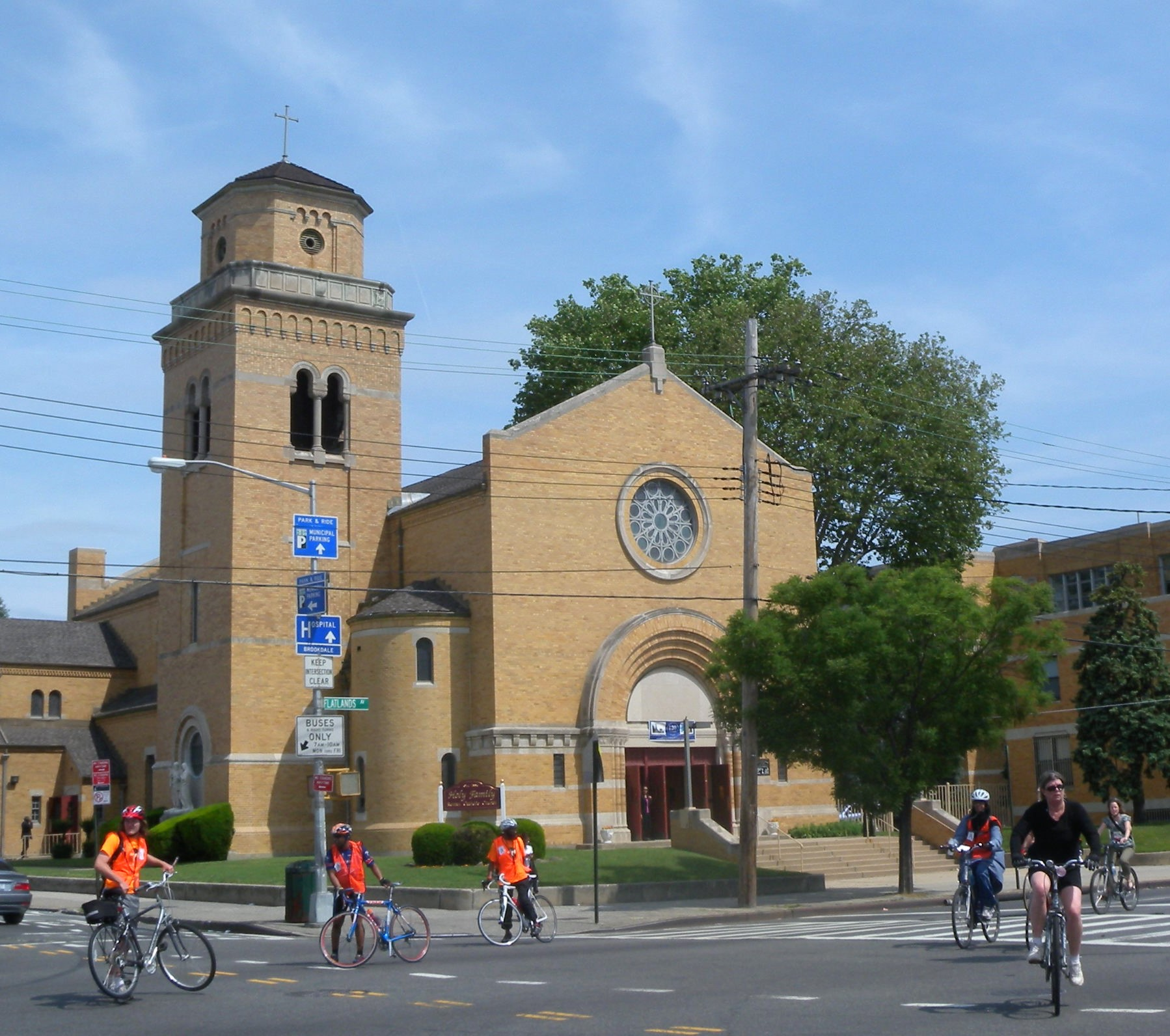
At Flatlands Avenue

Rockaway Parkway is a major commercial street in the Canarsie neighborhood as well as the border between the Brownsville and East Flatbush neighborhoods of Brooklyn, New York. It occupies the position of East 97th Street in the Brooklyn street grid. Contrary to its name, Rockaway Parkway does not enter the Rockaways in Queens.

== Structures ==
Canarsie High School campus, which includes the Urban Action Academy, High School for Innovation in Advertising and Media, and High School for Medical Professions, is at 1600 Rockaway Parkway. Also, a firehouse, churches (including the Holy Family Roman Catholic Church and a Church of God in Christ), and dozens of homes and businesses are on Rockaway Parkway.

== Transportation ==
The following subway stations serve Rockaway Parkway:

- The Rockaway Parkway station is the southern terminus of the BMT Canarsie Line (L train).
- The Sutter Avenue-Rutland Road station is located one block away from the intersection of Rockaway Parkway and Rutland Road, over East 98th Street.
- The IRT New Lots Line also runs parallel to the street from East NY Avenue to Clarkson Avenue.

And these bus routes serve the corridor:

- The B42 bus runs primarily along Rockaway Parkway, between Glenwood Road and either Schenck Street (Canarsie Pier), or Shore Parkway (Rockaway Parkway station). Riders can transfer for free from the station.
- The B60 runs between Rockaway Avenue and either Glenwood Road (Canarsie), or Flatlands Avenue (Williamsburg).
- All westbound B6 and B82 buses run from Glenwood Road to Flatlands Avenue.
- The B47 runs between Clarkson Avenue and either Winthrop Street (Woodhull Hospital), or Rutland Road (Kings Plaza).

== History ==
Rockaway Parkway originated as an 18th-century road to the Canarsie Ferry.

== Description ==
Rockaway Parkway is divided into two segments by the Bay Ridge Branch of the LIRR.

Its northern segment begins at East New York Avenue in Brownsville. It then intersects Linden Boulevard and ends past Ditmas Avenue. The southern segment begins north of Avenue D in Canarsie, then intersects Flatlands Avenue, crosses under the Belt Parkway, and ends at Canarsie Pier. Northbound and southbound traffic is separated by a median between Linden Boulevard and Rockaway Avenue; south of Seaview Avenue, Rockaway Parkway again becomes separated by a median to its southern terminus at Canarsie Pier.

== See also ==
- Rockaway Parkway Line
