= Flatlands Avenue =

Avenue in Brooklyn, New York

Flatlands Avenue is a major street in the New York City borough of Brooklyn. It runs approximately 5 miles (8.0 km) east to west; from Avenue N and East 35th Street in Marine Park in the west, to Forbell Street, east of Fountain Avenue in East New York, near the Brooklyn-Queens border. The right-of-way continues in the southwestern Queens neighborhoods of Lindenwood and Howard Beach as 156th Avenue, separated by the remnants of Spring Creek. The portion of Flatlands Avenue east of Louisiana Avenue in East New York was previously mapped as Fairfield Avenue.

The avenue runs a diagonal path and intersects with several other major streets in Brooklyn, including Flatbush Avenue, Utica Avenue, Ralph Avenue, Rockaway Parkway, and Pennsylvania Avenue. For the most part, the avenue has four lanes, and there is a central median east of Ralph Avenue through Canarsie and East New York.

== Route description ==
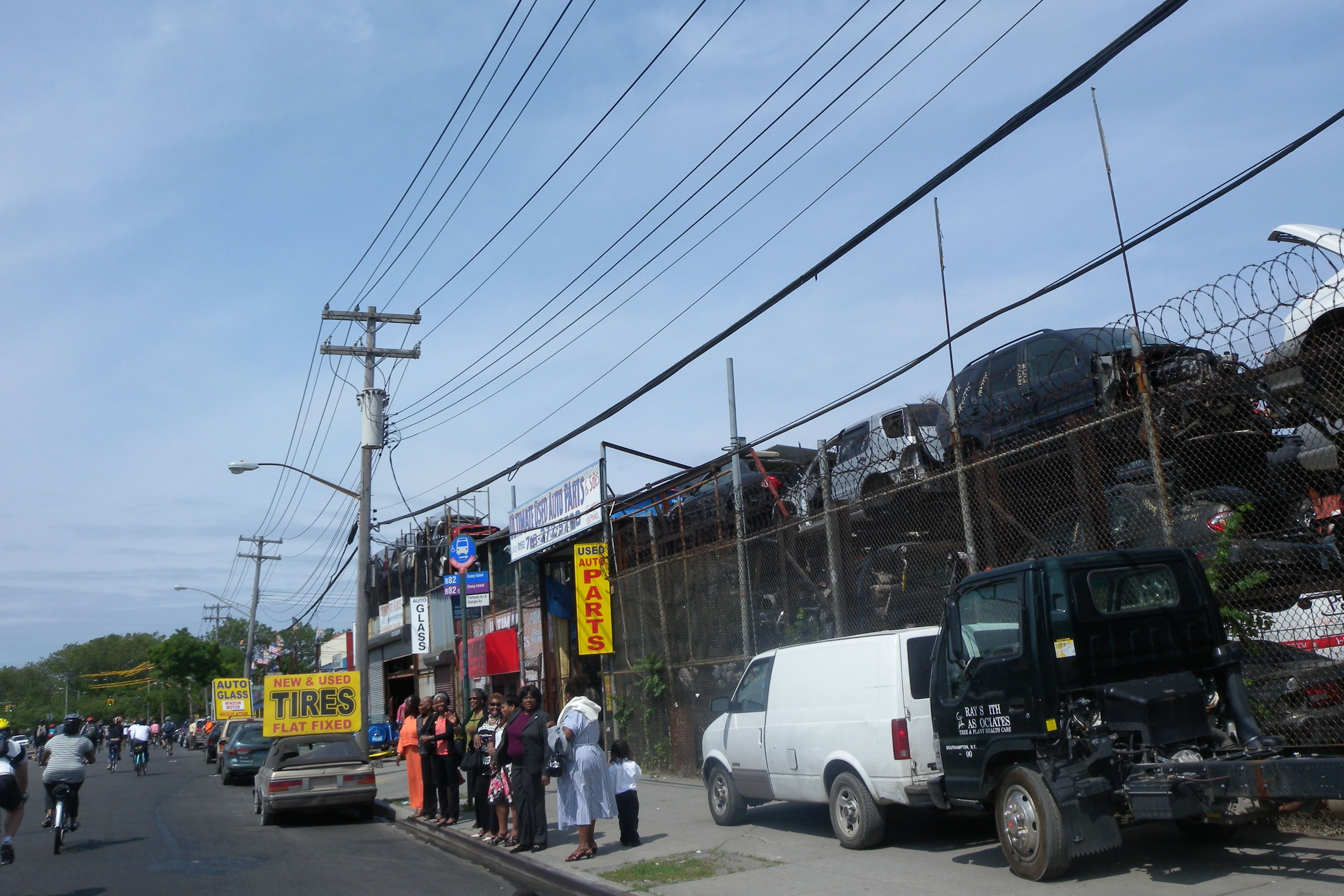
Near Georgia Avenue

Flatlands Avenue's western end is at an intersection with East 35th Street in Marine Park, forming a small triangle with Avenue N. After about seven blocks, it intersects with Flatbush Avenue, one block south of Kings Highway, and crosses into the neighborhood of Flatlands. At about Ralph Avenue where the street crosses into Canarsie, the avenue is adjacent to the north end of the Paerdegat Basin. Crossing into Spring Creek and Starrett City between East 108th Street and Louisiana Avenue, Flatlands Avenue marks the northern ends of Fresh Creek and Hendrix Creek. East of Fountain Avenue, the continuous Flatlands Avenue ends at an entrance to the large Brooklyn Postal Facility. One block east, Flatlands Avenue forms the southern boundary of a small two-block community between Grant Avenue, Cozine Avenue, and Forbell Street. This portion of the avenue is only accessible from Forbell Street.

== Points of interest ==
Notable points of interest include:

- Christian Cultural Center, at Louisiana Avenue in Starrett City.
- Spring Creek Depot, operated by the MTA Bus Company, at Crescent Street in Spring Creek.
- United States Postal Service Brooklyn Processing and Distribution Center, also known as the Brooklyn P&DC or simply the Postal Facility, adjacent to the bus depot.

=== Education ===
South Shore Educational Campus (formerly South Shore High School) is located on this avenue at its intersection with Ralph Avenue in Canarsie. Canarsie Educational Campus (formerly Canarsie High School) is located at Rockaway Parkway one block south of Flatlands Avenue. Spring Creek Educational Campus is located on the south side of the street between Elton Street and Linwood Street.

== Transportation ==
Flatlands Avenue is served by the following bus routes:

- All B82 buses run on the avenue from Pennsylvania Avenue in Starrett City to Avenue K in Flatlands, with local service extended to Flatbush Avenue, after which both run on Kings Highway. The route is absent between East 103rd Street and either East 96th Street (Starrett City), or Rockaway Parkway (opposite terminals).
- A short portion of the street in Spring Creek between Jerome Street and Fountain Avenue is served by the B84. From there, the Wyckoff Hospital-bound B13 takes over until Crescent Street.
- West of Williams Avenue, where three bus routes terminate, the B103 and BM2 run to East 105th Street, and the Williamsburg-bound B60 continues until Rockaway Parkway. Rush-hour BM2 service continues east from Williams until Pennsylvania Avenue, then heads south for Seaview Avenue.
- The B6 runs between Ralph Avenue and either Rockaway Parkway (Bensonhurst) or East 96th Street (opposite terminals).
- All B17 buses that serve Paerdegat Basin run from East 96th Street to Remsen Avenue.

No New York City Subway lines directly serve Flatlands Avenue. The BMT Canarsie Line, currently served by L train, formerly had a surface station at Flatlands Avenue which was closed around 1920 and replaced by trolley service (now the B42 bus). The line's current terminal at Rockaway Parkway and Glenwood Road in Canarsie is two blocks north of Flatlands Avenue. In 1968, plans were made to extend the IRT New Lots Line (2, 3, 4, and 5 trains) from its current terminal at New Lots Avenue and Livonia Avenue south to Flatlands Avenue in Spring Creek at around Elton Street. The plans were never realized due to lack of funding, though there is talk of reviving the proposal.
