= Morgan Avenue station =

New York City Subway station in Brooklyn

Morgan Avenue
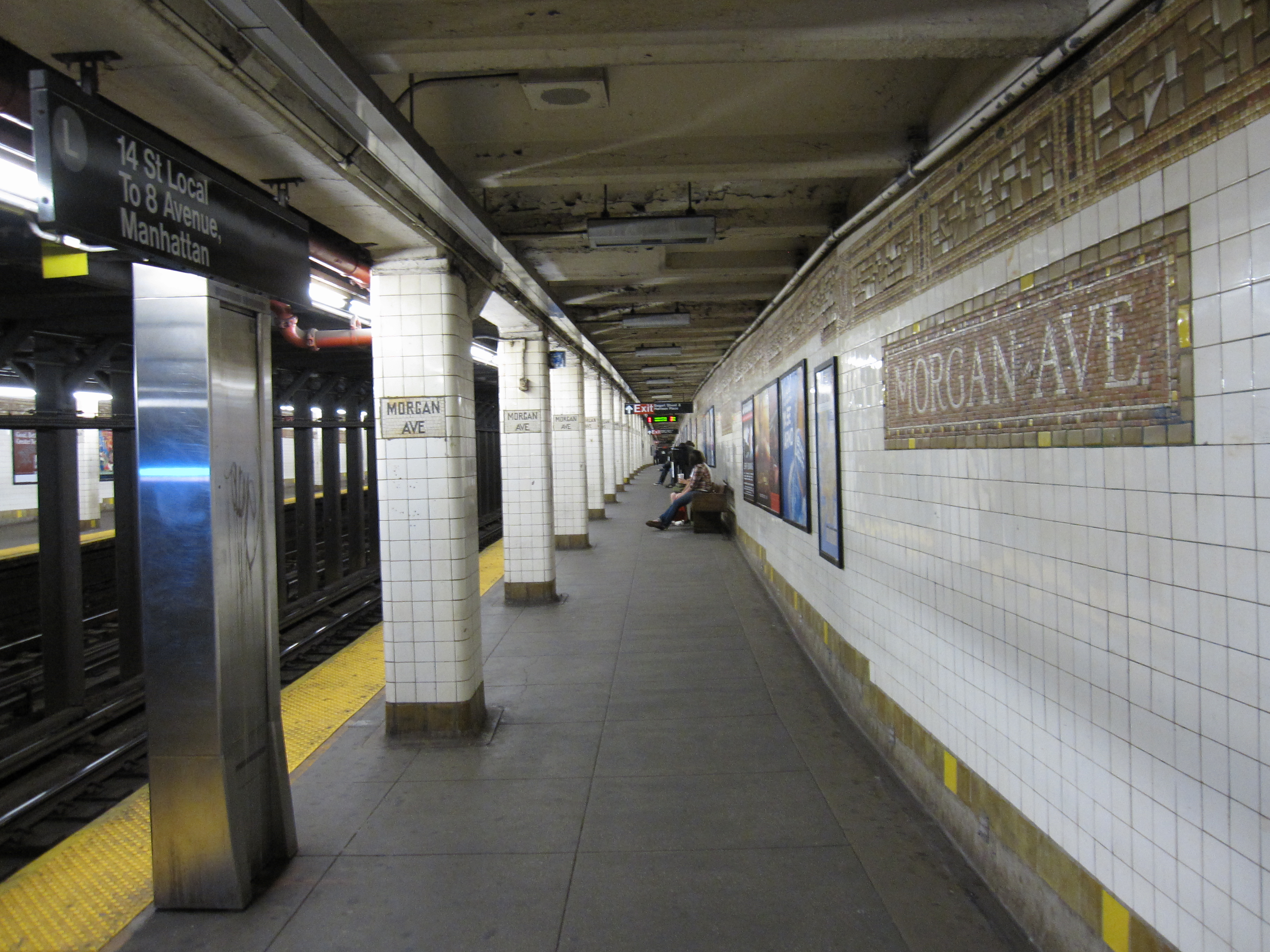
- Southbound platform

Station statistics
- Address: Morgan Avenue & Harrison Place; Brooklyn, New York
- Borough: Brooklyn
- Locale: Bushwick
- Coordinates: 40.706279°N 73.93198°W
- Division: B (BMT)
- Line: BMT Canarsie Line
- Services: L (all times)
- Transit: NYCT Bus: B60
- Structure: Underground
- Platforms: 2 side platforms
- Tracks: 2

Other information
- Opened: July 14, 1928; 98 years ago

Traffic
- 2025: 2,076,933 ▲16.1%
- Rank: 176 out of 423
Services
Preceding station	New York City Subway	Following station
Montrose Avenue toward Eighth Avenue	L (New York City Subway service)	Jefferson Street toward Canarsie–Rockaway Parkway
Location
Location within New York City Subway
Location within New York City
Location within New York
Track layout
Street map
Station service legend
Symbol	Description
Stops all times	Stops all times

The Morgan Avenue station is a station on the BMT Canarsie Line of the New York City Subway. Located at the intersection of Morgan Avenue and Harrison Place in Bushwick, Brooklyn, it is served by the L train at all times.

== History ==
=== Background ===
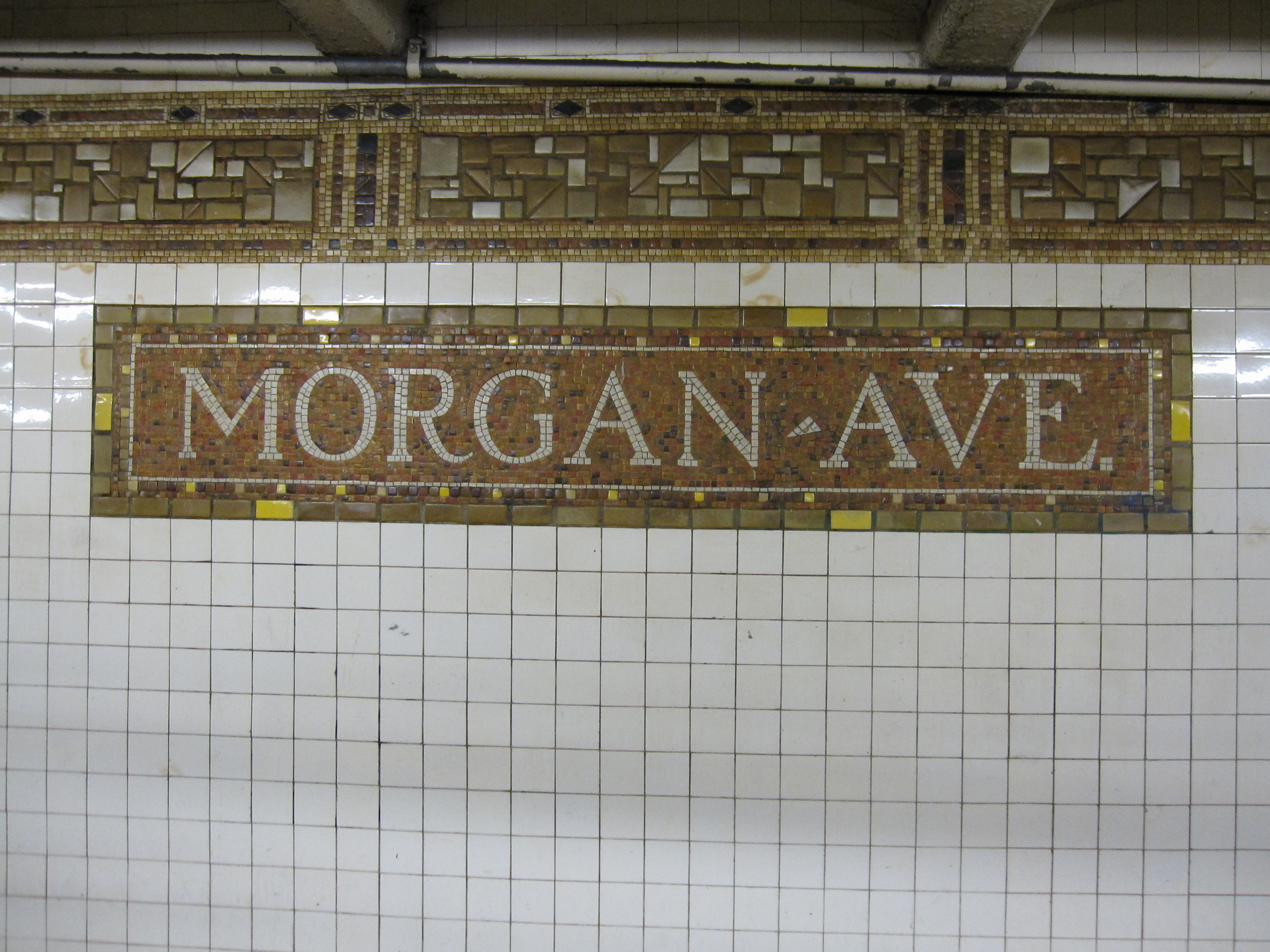
Mosaics showing the station name

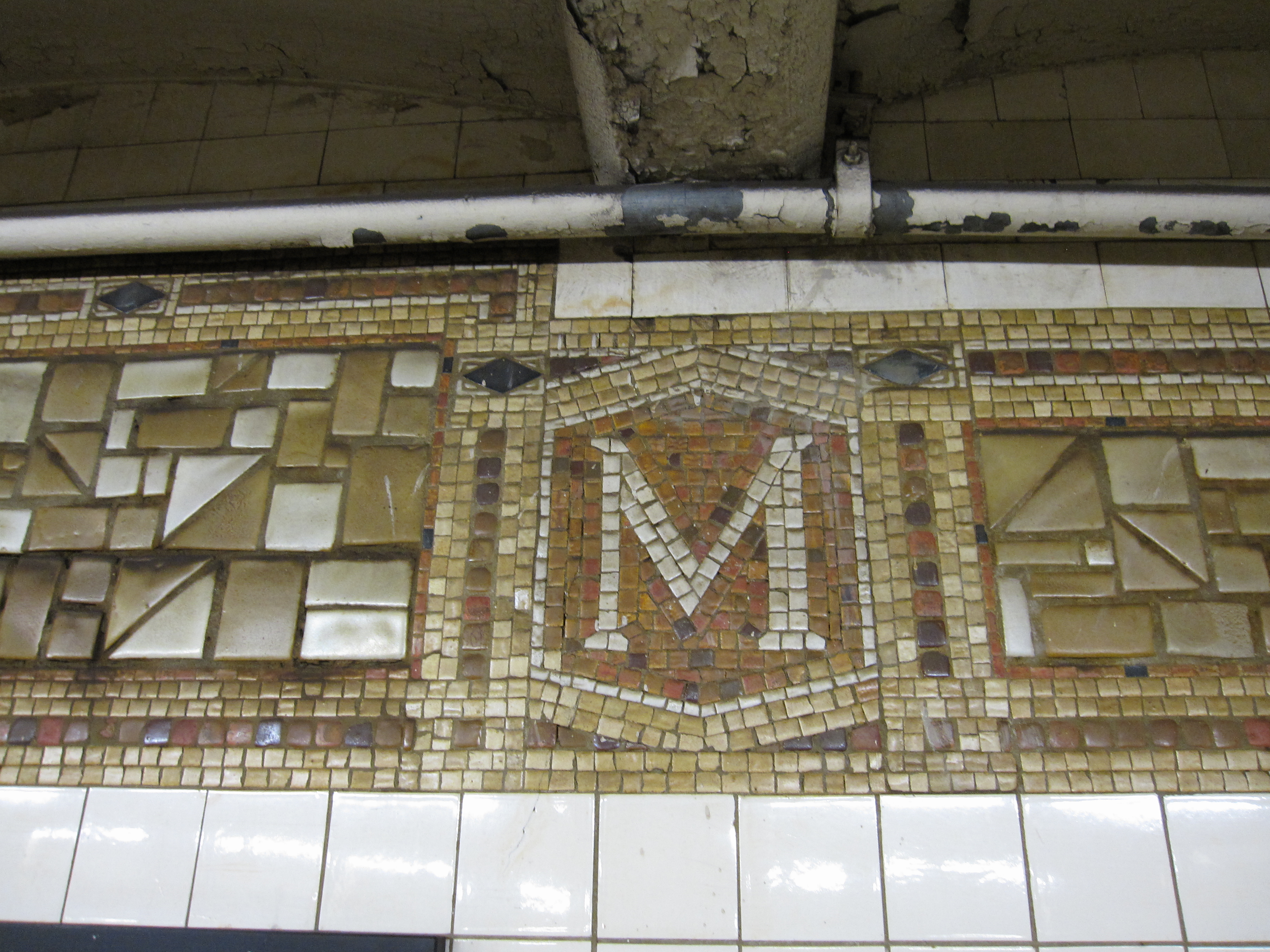
Tilework

The Dual Contracts also called for a subway line initially known as the 14th Street–Eastern District Line, usually shortened to 14th Street–Eastern Line. The line would run beneath 14th Street in Manhattan, from Sixth Avenue under the East River and through Williamsburg to Montrose and Bushwick Avenues in Brooklyn. Booth and Flinn was awarded the contract to construct the line on January 13, 1916. Clifford Milburn Holland served as the engineer-in-charge during the construction.

Due to the city's failure to approve the section of the line between Montrose Avenue and East New York, the 14th Street/Eastern Line was initially isolated from the rest of the system. In 1924, a temporary connection was built from the Long Island Rail Road (LIRR)'s Bushwick Yard that ran via Montrose Avenue and then connected to the 14th Street/Eastern Line under Bushwick Avenue just near the Montrose Avenue station. This was done to allow the delivery of BMT Standard subway cars. The first of the cars were delivered by this ramp on June 20, 1924. On June 30, 1924, the section between Sixth Avenue in Manhattan and Montrose Avenue in Brooklyn opened.

=== Construction and opening ===
For the extension of the 14th Street/Eastern Line from Montrose Avenue to East New York, the New York City Board of Estimate had initially given its consent to an elevated line over the Evergreen Branch of the LIRR. The Board of Estimate subsequently refused to allow a construction contract for the elevated line, while the BRT did not want to build an underground line. The extension was changed to an underground alignment following opposition from industries on the Evergreen Branch. In July 1924, the New York City Board of Transportation (BOT) approved a modified route for recommendation to the Board of Estimate. The route would be wholly underground and consist of three tracks. From Montrose Avenue, it would curve east under McKibbin Street, private property, and Harrison Place. Past Varick Avenue, it would turn southeast to Wyckoff Avenue, underneath which it would run to Eldert Street. This plan was to cost $8 million.

In September 1924, the BOT approved the remaining section of the route between Eldert Street and Broadway Junction in East New York. East of Eldert Street, the route would turn south to a ground-level alignment parallel to the LIRR's Bay Ridge Branch, then run southeast in a tunnel underneath private property to the intersection of Eastern Parkway and Bushwick Avenue, where it would emerge onto a ramp leading to the existing Canarsie elevated. An ornamental viaduct over Bushwick Avenue and Eastern Parkway was removed from the original plans due to opposition from property owners.

Three contracts for the construction of the extension were awarded in December at a total cost of $9,531,204. The section from Montrose Avenue to Varick Avenue was awarded to the Underpinning and Foundation Company, while the section from Varick Avenue to Bleecker Street and from Bleecker Street to Halsey Street went to the Oakdale Contracting Company.

On July 14, 1928, the line was extended further east beneath Wyckoff Avenue and then south, paralleling the Bay Ridge Branch to a new station at Broadway Junction, above the existing station on the Broadway Elevated (Jamaica Line). At this time, it was connected to the already-operating elevated line to Canarsie. The Morgan Avenue station opened as part of this extension.

In 2024, the MTA installed low platform-edge fences at the Morgan Avenue station and several others on the Canarsie Line to reduce the likelihood of passengers falling onto the tracks. The barriers, spaced along the length of the platform, do not have sliding platform screen doors between them.

== Station layout ==
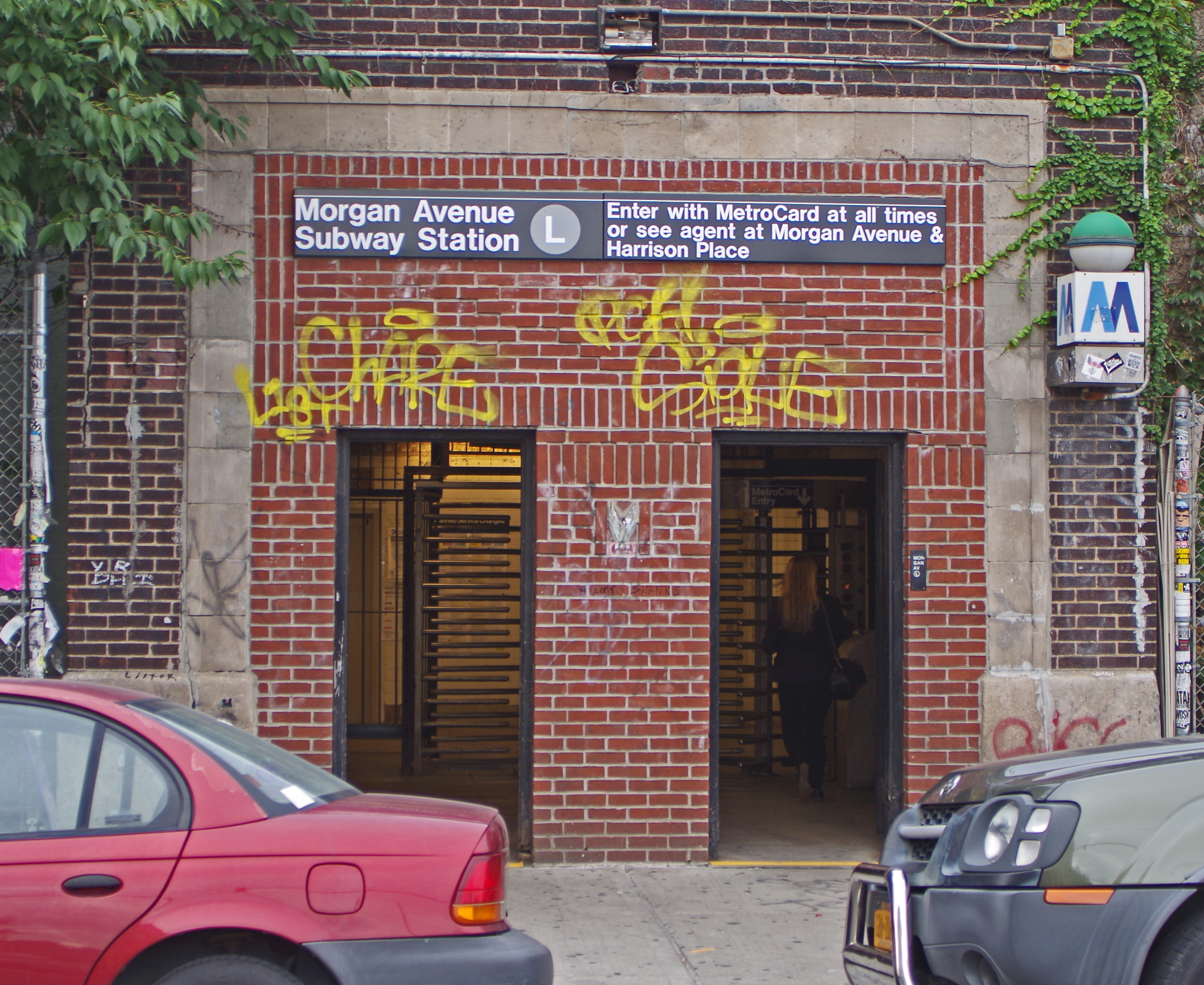
View of the station house entrance

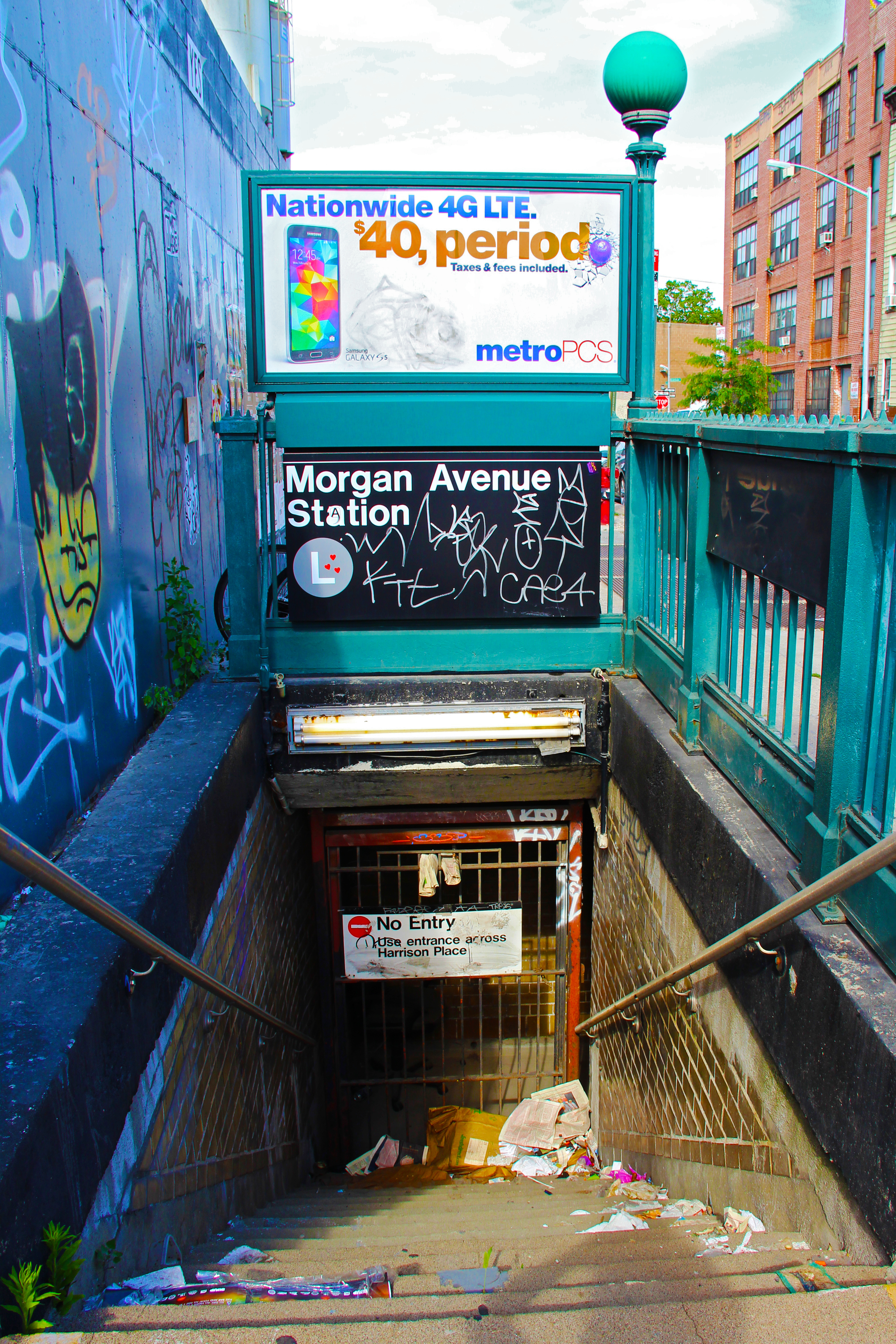
View of the station's closed entrance

This station has two tracks and two side platforms. Fixed platform barriers, which are intended to prevent commuters falling to the tracks, are positioned near the platform edges. Both platforms have their original BMT style mosaic trim line and name tablets that are predominantly earth tones of brown, tan, and orange with white accents. There are "M" tablets for "Morgan" on the trim line at regular intervals and name tablets that have "MORGAN AVE" in serif font. There are also directional mosaic signs in the same style as the name tablets.

Both platforms have large square columns tiled in white since they are below buildings and not the sidewalk. All of them have name plates reading "MORGAN AVE" in black sans serif lettering on a white mosaic background. The mosaic name plates on the columns are unusual to the subway system, since most of the system's station-pillar name plates are merely plaques.

=== Exits ===
This station has two entrances/exits. There is a staffed entrance at the extreme east (railroad south) end of the station with a token booth. A long ramp from each platform leads to a waiting area that allows a free transfer between directions. A turnstile bank leads to a mezzanine with a token booth and three street stairs going up to all corners of Morgan Avenue and Harrison Place except the northwestern one. One of the stairs features an original BMT design while the other two were renovated later. The entrances serve a mostly industrial area, so they are not heavily used; the one to the northeastern corner was closed in the early 2010s.

The station's other entrance/exit is in an unstaffed brick station house on ground level on the west side of Bogart Street on the T-intersection of Harrison Place. There are two exit-only and one High Entry/Exit turnstiles inside and one staircase to each platform at their west (railroad north) ends. This is also a full-time entrance.

== In popular culture ==
This station appeared in MF Doom's music video of his 1999 single I Hear Voices as well as the New York City-set scenes of the video game Rock Band.
