= Third Avenue station (BMT Canarsie Line) =

New York City Subway station in Manhattan

3 Avenue
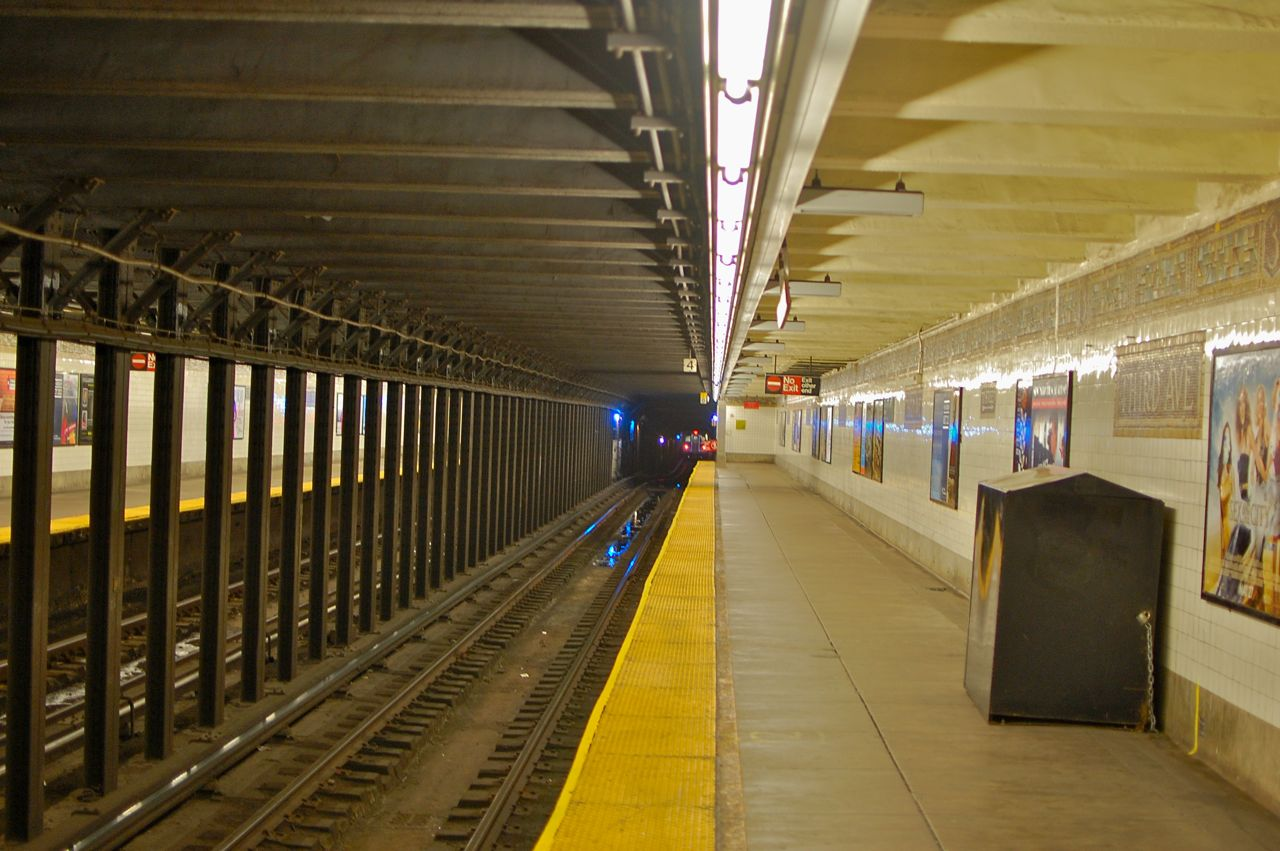
- Southbound platform with L train in the distance

Station statistics
- Address: Third Avenue & East 14th Street; New York, New York
- Borough: Manhattan
- Locale: East Village, Stuyvesant Square
- Coordinates: 40.733243°N 73.987212°W
- Division: B (BMT)
- Line: BMT Canarsie Line
- Services: L (all times)
- Transit: NYCT Bus: M14A SBS, M14D SBS, M101, M102, M103
- Structure: Underground
- Platforms: 2 side platforms
- Tracks: 2

Other information
- Opened: June 30, 1924; 102 years ago

Traffic
- 2025: 1,884,103 ▲10.4%
- Rank: 185 out of 423
Services
Preceding station	New York City Subway	Following station
Union Square toward Eighth Avenue	L (New York City Subway service)	First Avenue toward Canarsie–Rockaway Parkway
Location
Location within New York City Subway
Location within New York City
Location within New York
Track layout
Street map
Station service legend
Symbol	Description
Stops all times	Stops all times

The Third Avenue station is a station on the BMT Canarsie Line of the New York City Subway. Located at the intersection of Third Avenue and East 14th Street in East Village, Manhattan, it is served by the L train at all times.

== History ==
Contract 4 of the Dual Contracts, adopted on March 4, 1913 between New York City and the Brooklyn Rapid Transit Company, included a subway route under 14th Street, to run to Canarsie in Brooklyn; this became the BMT's Canarsie Line.

Booth and Flinn was awarded the first contract for the line, namely a tunnel under the East River, in January 1916. At the time, the Public Service Commission was completing plans for the rest of the line; the commission began accepting bids for two parts of the line within Manhattan, sections 1 and 2. in April 1916. The next month, Booth and Flinn won the contract for section 1, which was to cost $2.528 million (equivalent to $74.796 million in 2025). By early 1919, the section of the line under 14th Street was about 20 percent completed.

In 1922, the Charles H. Brown & Son Corporation was contracted to build out the Canarsie Line's stations in Manhattan, including the Third Avenue station. Track-laying in the tunnels between Sixth and Montrose Avenues started in the last week of October 1922. The Third Avenue station at Union Square opened on June 30, 1924, as part of the 14th Street–Eastern Line, which ran from Sixth Avenue under the East River and through Williamsburg to Montrose and Bushwick Avenues.

In 2026, a software engineer and daily rider began petitioning to permanently close the station, claiming that the closure would save 1,800 hours per day in travel times. The MTA responded saying that they "are aware of this new data, and appreciate the creative thinking."

== Station layout ==
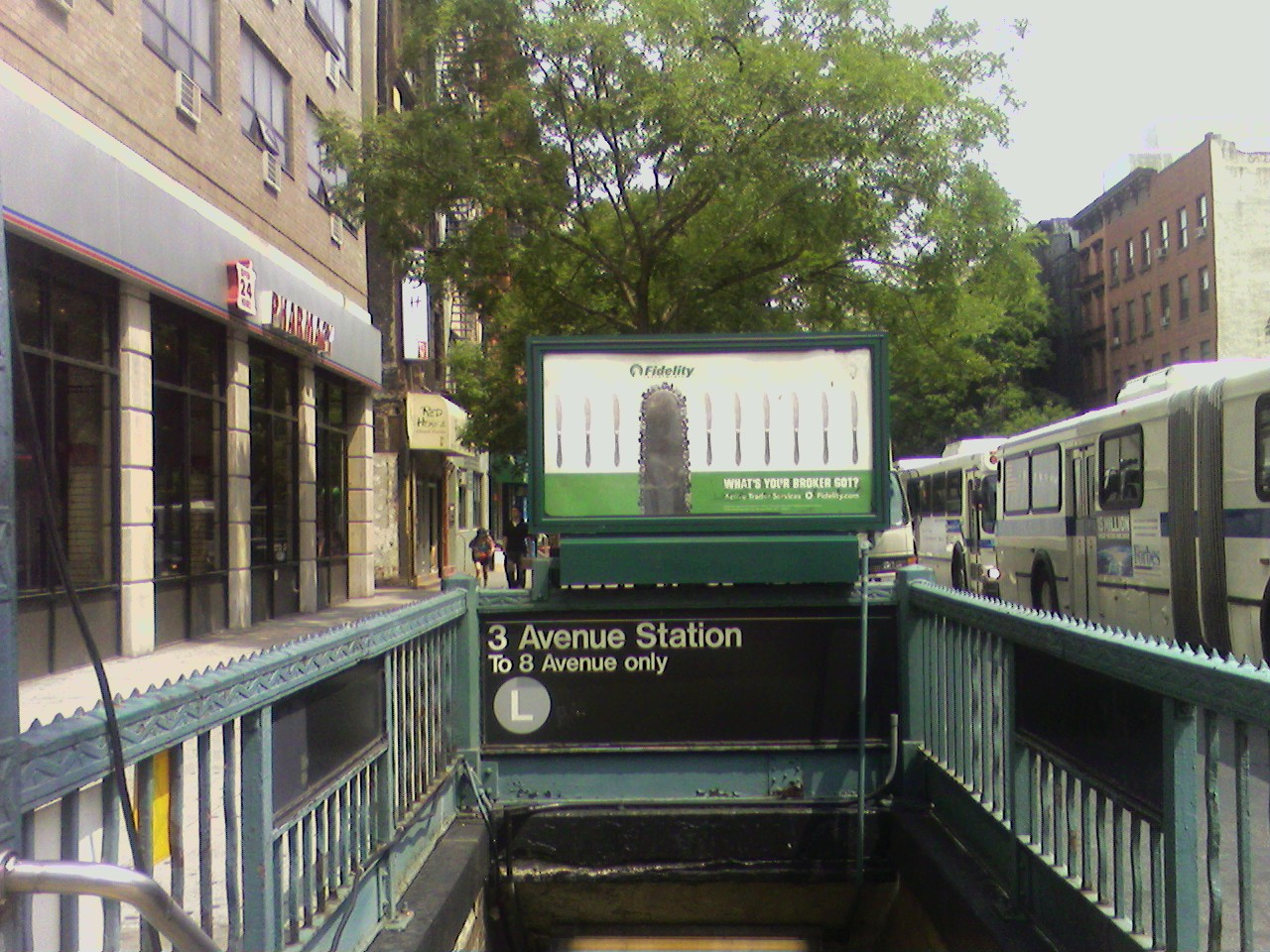
Entrance to the station

This station has two side platforms, which are 500 feet (150 m) long, and two tracks. West of the station, there is a double crossover. The platforms are column-less and have the standard BMT style trim-line and name tablets. The former contains "3" tablets in standard intervals, while the latter consists of "THIRD AVE" in seriffed lettering.

There are also directions signs to the station's only entrances/exits saying "TO STREET" in the same style as the name tablets. Each platform has its own same-level fare control at the extreme west (railroad north) end. As a result, there is no free transfer between directions.

Third Avenue is one of only two stations along the Canarsie Line in Manhattan that does not contain a transfer to another line. The other station is the nearby First Avenue Subway station. However, a transfer station is planned to the 14th Street station of the Second Avenue Subway, as part of Phase 3 of the line's construction from 55th Street to Houston Street.

=== Exits ===
Each platform-level fare control area has a bank of turnstiles, token booth, and two street stairs apiece—one to the east side of Third Avenue and East 14th Street, the other to East 14th Street just east of Third Avenue. The stairs on the Eighth Avenue-bound side lead to the northeast corner, while the ones on the Brooklyn-bound side lead to the southeast corner.

=== Experimental platform doors ===
As part of a pilot program, each platform at the Third Avenue station was supposed to be refitted with 32 half-height platform screen doors (PSDs) while the 14th Street Tunnel was being rebuilt from April 2019 to March 2020. This had been possible as a result of the L train's automated train operation, as well as the route's exclusive use of 60-foot-long (18 m) subway cars with four doors, which allow trains to stop at the same part of the platform every time. The MTA would have used the results of the pilot in order to determine the feasibility of adding such doors citywide. The PSDs would have been approximately 54 inches (140 cm) high and would have been coordinated with the location of the subway car doors when a train was in the station.

To ensure that the subway car is precisely lined up with the doors, a wayside-only berthing system would be installed. Emergency egress gates would be installed in between the regular doors to allow people to exit in the case of an emergency. The platform edges and topping would be removed and replaced so that they align with the sills of the train doors and to be in compliance with the Americans with Disabilities Act of 1990. To ensure that people do not get trapped in between the subway car doors and the PSDs, sensors and CCTV cameras would be installed with monitors at the center and front of the platforms visible to the train operator and conductor.

In June 2018, the $30 million for the platform edge door pilot program was diverted to another project along the Canarsie Line: the installation of elevators at the Sixth Avenue station. The pilot program was postponed until sufficient funding could be found. In February 2022, the MTA announced that the PSD installation at Third Avenue would proceed as part of a pilot program involving three stations. The announcement came after several people had been shoved onto tracks, including one incident that led to a woman's death at another station. The MTA started soliciting bids from platform-door manufacturers in mid-2022; the doors are planned to be installed starting in December 2023 at a cost of $6 million. Designs for the platform doors were being finalized by June 2023.
