= First Avenue station (BMT Canarsie Line) =

New York City Subway station in Manhattan

1 Avenue
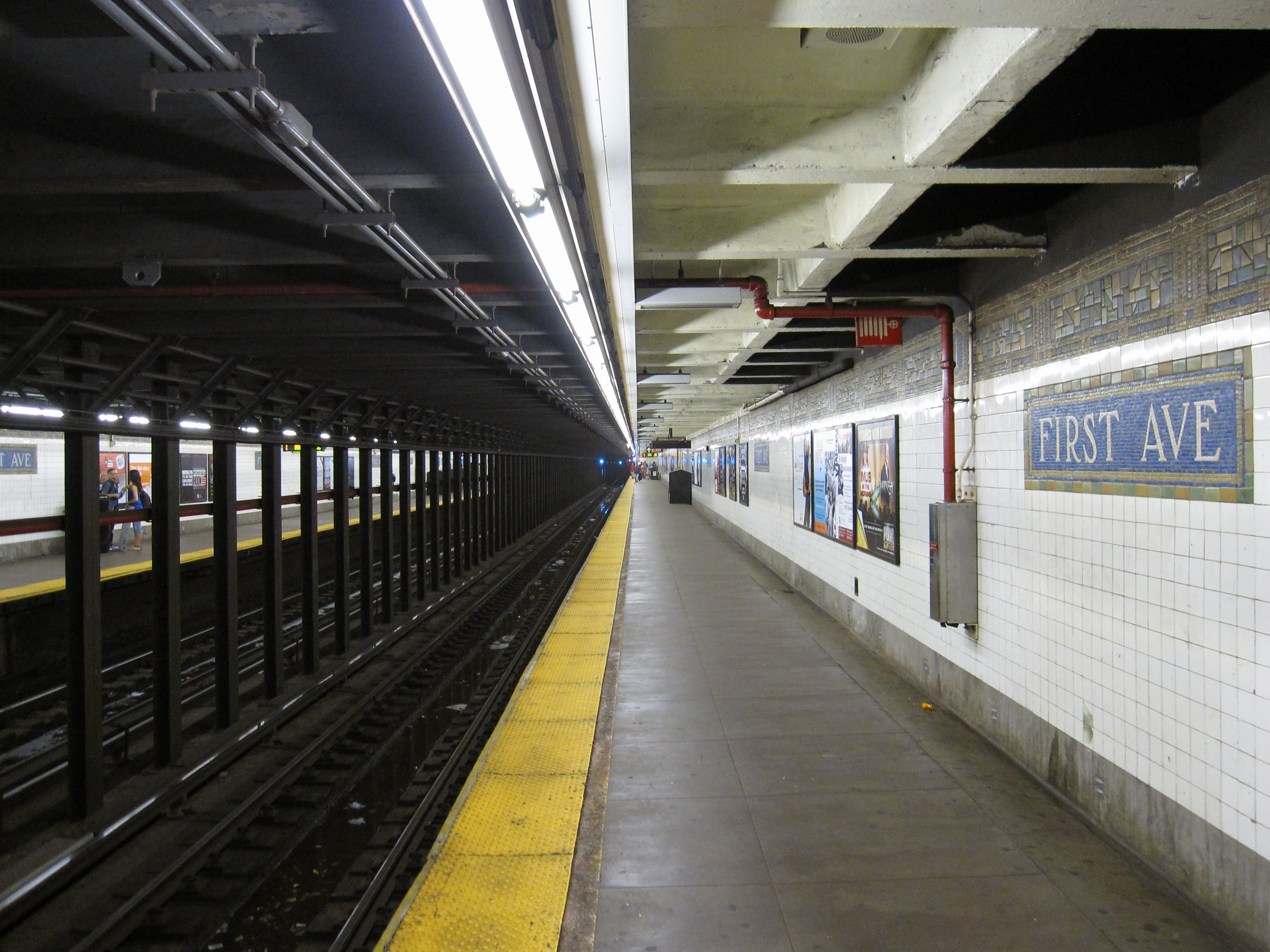
- Northbound platform

Station statistics
- Address: First Avenue & East 14th Street; New York, New York
- Borough: Manhattan
- Locale: East Village, Stuyvesant Park, Stuyvesant Town
- Coordinates: 40.731324°N 73.982577°W
- Division: B (BMT)
- Line: BMT Canarsie Line
- Services: L (all times)
- Transit: NYCT Bus: M14A SBS, M14D SBS, M15, M15 SBS
- Structure: Underground
- Platforms: 2 side platforms
- Tracks: 2

Other information
- Opened: June 30, 1924; 102 years ago
- Rebuilt: July 1, 2019; 7 years ago to December 31, 2020; 5 years ago
- Accessible: Yes

Traffic
- 2025: 7,301,507 ▲18%
- Rank: 30 out of 423
Services
Preceding station	New York City Subway	Following station
Third Avenue toward Eighth Avenue	L (New York City Subway service)	Bedford Avenue toward Canarsie–Rockaway Parkway
Location
Location within New York City Subway
Location within New York City
Location within New York
Track layout
Street map
Station service legend
Symbol	Description
Stops all times	Stops all times

The First Avenue station is a station on the BMT Canarsie Line of the New York City Subway. Located at the intersection of First Avenue and East 14th Street at the border of Stuyvesant Park, Stuyvesant Town, and the East Village in Manhattan, it is served by the L train at all times.

== History ==
Contract 4 of the Dual Contracts, adopted on March 4, 1913, between New York City and the Brooklyn Rapid Transit Company, included a subway route under 14th Street, to run to Canarsie in Brooklyn; this became the BMT's Canarsie Line.

Booth and Flinn was awarded the first contract for the line, namely a tunnel under the East River, in January 1916. At the time, the Public Service Commission was completing plans for the rest of the line; the commission began accepting bids for two parts of the line within Manhattan, sections 1 and 2. in April 1916. The next month, Booth and Flinn won the contract for section 1, which was to cost $2.528 million (equivalent to $74.796 million in 2025). By early 1919, the section of the line under 14th Street was about 20 percent completed.

In 1922, the Charles H. Brown & Son Corporation was contracted to build out the Canarsie Line's stations in Manhattan, including the First Avenue station. Track-laying in the tunnels between Sixth and Montrose Avenues started in the last week of October 1922. The First Avenue station at Union Square opened on June 30, 1924, as part of the 14th Street–Eastern Line, which ran from Sixth Avenue under the East River and through Williamsburg to Montrose and Bushwick Avenues.

In September 1983, this station was the site of the arrest of Michael Stewart, a notable case in the history of police brutality.

The station originally had entrances only at its western end, on First Avenue. Its eastern entrances at Avenue A were built as part of the wide scope in the 2019–2020 rebuilding of the Canarsie Tubes that were damaged during Hurricane Sandy, and to improve service for people living in Stuyvesant Town–Peter Cooper Village, the East Village, and Alphabet City. Work on the entrances began in July 2017, necessitating the relocation of bus stops at that intersection. The entrances to the Brooklyn-bound platform were opened on November 4, 2019. The entrance to the Eighth Avenue-bound platform was expected to be opened by the end of 2019, but the opening date was postponed to February 10, 2020. This was followed by the temporary closure of the entrances at First Avenue. New elevators were built at the new eastern entrances and were opened on August 6, 2020. Substantial completion of the entrances occurred in November 2020.

In June 2024, the MTA installed low platform-edge fences at the First Avenue station and several others on the Canarsie Line to reduce the likelihood of passengers falling onto the tracks. The barriers, spaced along the length of the platform, do not have sliding platform screen doors between them.

== Station layout ==
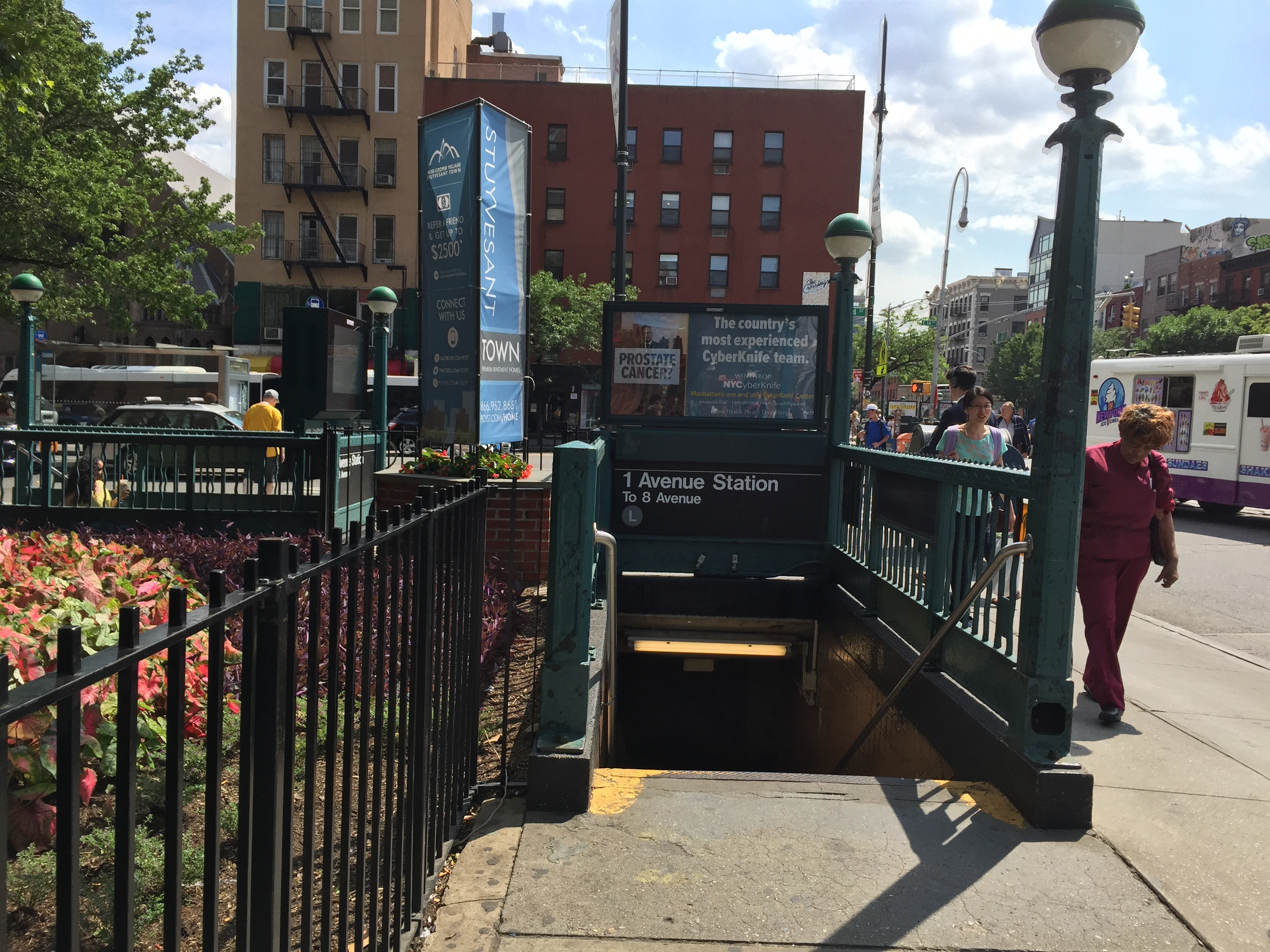
Old entrance structure (since remodeled)

This underground station has two side platforms and two tracks. Fixed platform barriers, which are intended to prevent commuters falling to the tracks, are positioned near the platform edges. It is the easternmost Canarsie Line station in Manhattan. East of here, the line travels under the East River to Williamsburg, Brooklyn. The platforms are columnless and have the standard BMT style trim-line and name tablets. The former contains "1" tablets in standard intervals, while the latter consists of "FIRST AVE" in white seriffed lettering.

=== Exits ===
The station's western entrances are at the (railroad north) end of the station; from each platform, a single staircase goes up to a small mezzanine that contains a turnstile bank, token booth. Two street stairs to the Eighth Avenue-bound platform lead to the northeastern corner of First Avenue and 14th Street, while the ones to the Brooklyn-bound platform lead to the southeastern corner. The mezzanine on the Brooklyn-bound side had a florist shop outside fare control; the shop closed in 2019. There is no free transfer between directions at this station.

The station's eastern entrances are at the railroad south end of the station; there are platform-level turnstile banks from each platform. Two street stairs to the Eighth Avenue-bound platform lead to the northwestern corner of Avenue A and 14th Street, while two more to the Brooklyn-bound platform lead to the southwestern corner. Each eastern entrance has an elevator between the platform and the street.

=== Art ===
The station contains two sets of mosaic artwork by Katherine Bradford. The eastern entrances include three large works collectively titled Queens of the Night, which depict figures in dancelike poses against a sapphire blue background. In addition, the First Avenue mezzanines contain two smaller works of flying superheroes, titled Superhero Responds. The mosaics cover 400 square feet (37 m^{2}) in total. When the artworks were commissioned, Bradford used the L train on her daily commute, passing through the First Avenue station.

== Image gallery ==
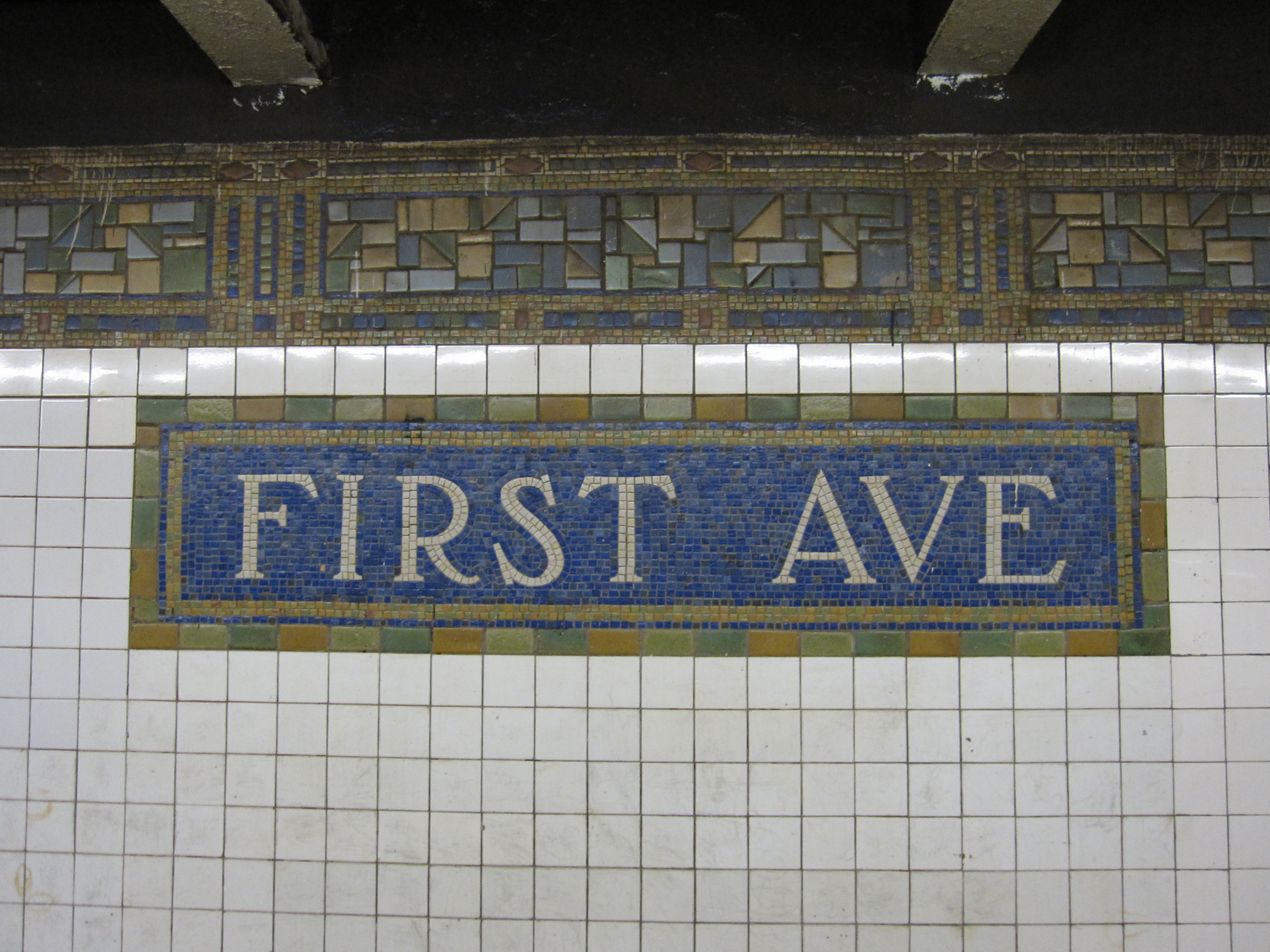
Name Tablet

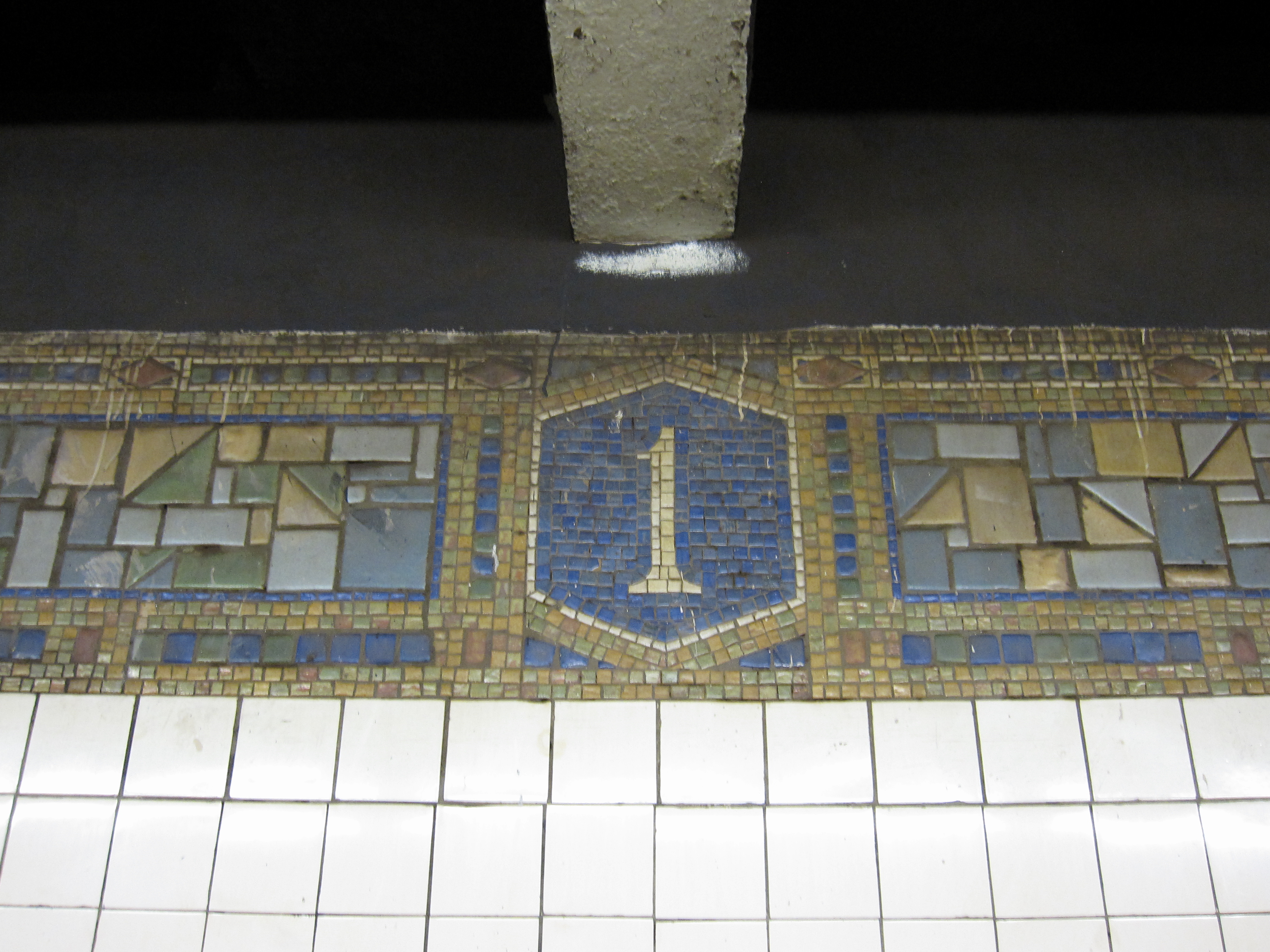
Trim-line Tablet

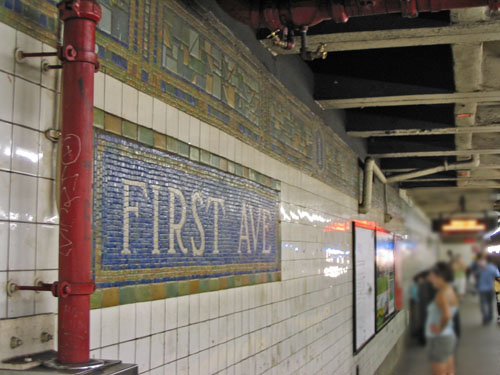
Station wall

== Nearby points of interest ==
- Beth Israel Medical Center
- Stuyvesant High School Old Campus (High School for Health Professions and Human Services, Institute for Collaborative Education, and PS 226)
- Stuyvesant Square
- Stuyvesant Town
