= BMT Canarsie Line =

New York City Subway line

- The L train, which uses the entire Canarsie Line, is colored gray.

Overview
- Owner: City of New York
- Locale: Manhattan and Brooklyn, New York City
- Termini: Eighth Avenue; Rockaway Parkway
- Stations: 27 (3 demolished)

Service
- Type: Rapid transit
- System: New York City Subway
- Operator: New York City Transit Authority
- Daily ridership: 228,540

History
- Opened: October 21, 1865; 161 years ago
- Last extension: 1931

Technical
- Num of tracks: 2
- Character: At-grade (eastbound track at Wilson Avenue, section from East 105th Street to Rockaway Parkway); Elevated (eastbound track south of Wilson Avenue, Broadway Jct. to north of East 105th Street); Underground (north of Broadway Jct. except for eastbound track at Wilson Avenue)
- Track gauge: 4 ft 8 1/2 in (1,435 mm) standard gauge
- Electrification: Third rail, 625 V DC

The BMT Canarsie Line (sometimes referred to as the 14th Street–Eastern Line) is a rapid transit line of the B Division of the New York City Subway system, named after its terminus in the Canarsie neighborhood of Brooklyn. It is served by the L train at all times, which is shown in medium gray on the New York City Subway map and on station signs.

The line is part of the BMT Eastern Division, and is occasionally referred to as the Eastern District Line. This refers to Williamsburg, which was described as Brooklyn's "Eastern District" when the City of Williamsburg was annexed by the former City of Brooklyn. This was the location where the original Brooklyn subway portions of the line were laid out. Only later was the line connected to the tracks leading to Canarsie. Eastern District High School, near the line's Grand Street station, had preserved this toponym until it was closed in 1996, later reopened as Grand Street Educational Campus.

The Canarsie Line was first a steam railroad, then a Brooklyn Rapid Transit Company (BRT), later Brooklyn–Manhattan Transit Corporation (BMT), elevated line. It was extended into Manhattan via subway in 1924–1928. Since the early 2000s, the line's signal system has been converted to an automated system. The Manhattan section of the line was partially closed during off-peak hours from early 2019 to April 2020 to allow for a renovation of the 14th Street Tunnel, which the line uses to cross the East River.

== Extent and service ==
Services that use the Canarsie Line are colored medium gray. The following service uses all of the Canarsie Line:

| | Time period | Section of line |
|---|---|---|
| "L" train | All times | Entire line |

The Canarsie Line runs from its western terminal at Eighth Avenue and 14th Street in Manhattan to its eastern terminal at Rockaway Parkway in Canarsie, Brooklyn. It is double-tracked along its entire length, except for short stretches of layup track in Manhattan and Brooklyn. The line west of the East River is in Manhattan, while the rest of the route is in Brooklyn. At Myrtle–Wyckoff Avenues and Halsey Street, the line runs along Brooklyn's border with Queens.

Overview of the BMT Canarsie Line

The current line is a two-track subway from its western terminal to Broadway Junction in the East New York section of Brooklyn, with the exception of a short stretch at Wilson Avenue where it is a double-decked structure with the southbound track outdoors directly above the indoor, ground-level northbound track. Although the northbound track appears to be underground, it is in fact outdoors at ground-level for there are no stairs leading from the northbound platform to the station entrance at the dead-end of Wilson Avenue, southeast of Moffat Street. This is due to the line being pressed directly against the New York Connecting Railroad, which is pressed directly against the border of Trinity Cemetery. There are no express tracks on the Canarsie Line; all trains make local stops throughout their route. In the past, some trains have operated express service patterns between Lorimer Street and Myrtle Avenue by skipping intermediate stations on the same tracks; this last operated in August 1956.

Just before Broadway Junction, the line emerges onto an elevated structure, passing over the BMT Jamaica Line. Between Broadway Junction and Atlantic Avenue are the Canarsie Line's only track connections to the rest of the system, via flyover ramps connecting the Canarsie Line to the Jamaica Line and East New York Yard (and, until 1956, the Fulton Street Elevated). The Canarsie Line used to share the structure at Atlantic Avenue with the connection from the Broadway and Fulton Street elevated lines to the Liberty Avenue Elevated (still extant further east as part of the IND Fulton Street Line).

East of Pitkin Avenue, the Canarsie Line enters the two-track elevated structure on which the line was originally grade-separated in 1906, entering Sutter Avenue station. At the next station, Livonia Avenue, the Livonia Avenue Elevated of the IRT New Lots Line passes overhead, and just beyond this point is a single track connection to the Linden Shops, which is now a track and structures facility. Besides the connection at Broadway Junction, this non-electrified yard connection is the only other connection to the rest of the subway system, as it is indirectly a connection to the New Lots Line. B Division-sized equipment cannot access this line, however, because of A Division width restrictions.

Beyond the next station, New Lots Avenue, the elevated structure ends, and an incline brings the Canarsie down to the original 1865 surface right-of-way, the second-oldest such right-of-way on the New York City Transit Authority system. The line operates on this ground-level route to the end of the line at Rockaway Parkway.

As with other BMT Eastern Division lines, the Canarsie Line can accommodate trains with eight 60-foot-long (18 m) or eight 67-foot-long (20 m) cars. Due to the narrow turning radiuses of the lines, 75-foot-long (23 m) cars (R44, R46, R68, R68A) could not be used on the Eastern Division. All platforms on the Canarsie Line are at least 518 feet (158 m) long, but only one station, Sixth Avenue, can accommodate 600-foot-long (180 m) trains without the need for extensions. Additionally, about half of stations on the Canarsie Line can fit trains with nine 60-foot-long cars, though the front and back ends of the trains would overshoot the platform at many of these stations.

== History ==
=== Steam and elevated era ===
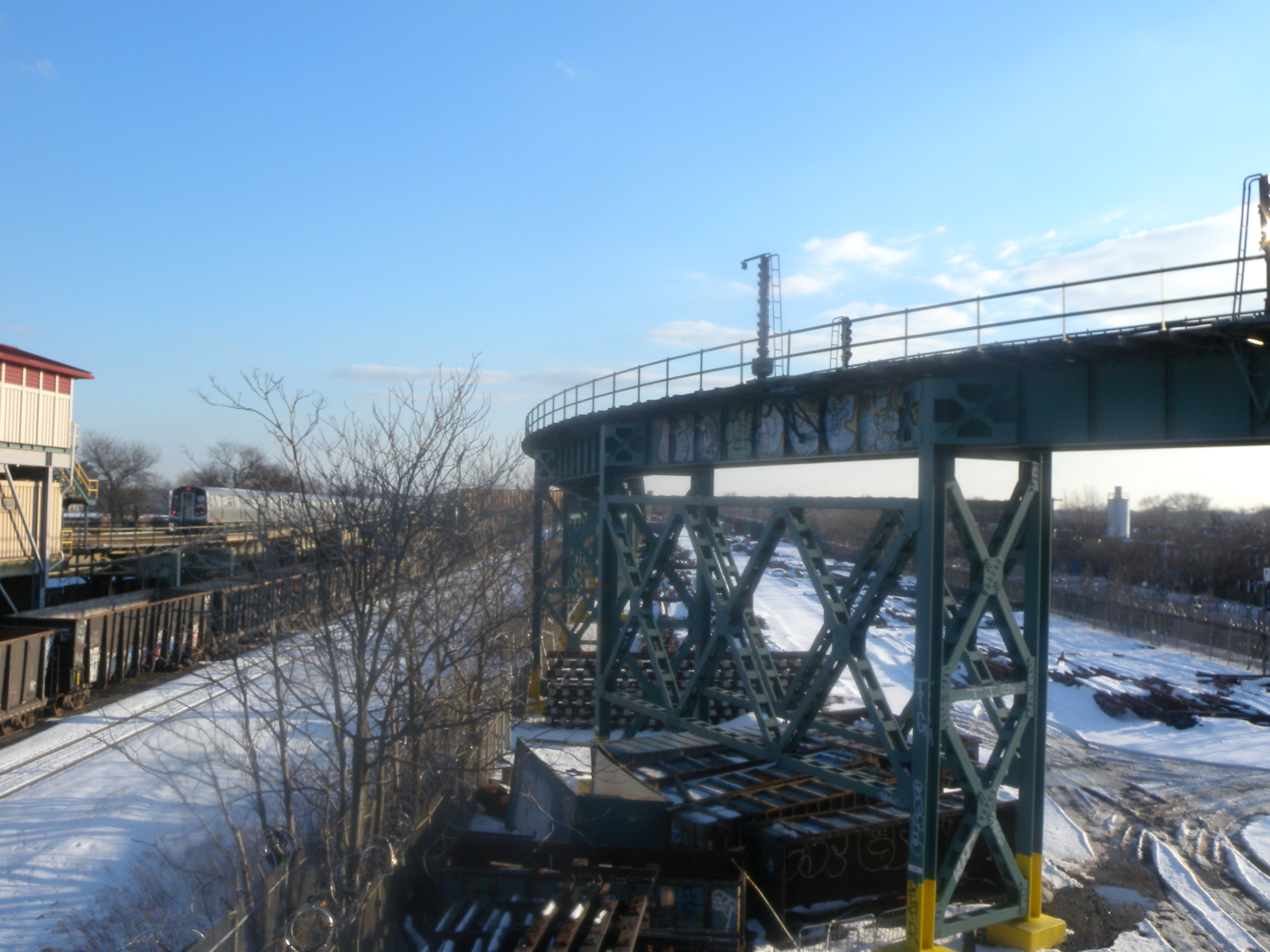
Junction with New Lots Line

Before becoming a BRT elevated line in 1906, the Canarsie Line operated as a steam dummy line. It was first owned by the Brooklyn and Rockaway Beach Railroad, chartered December 24, 1863, and opened October 21, 1865, from the Long Island Rail Road in East New York to a pier at Canarsie Landing, very close to the current junction of Rockaway Parkway and the Belt Parkway, where ferries continued on to Rockaway. North of New Lots Avenue, the line served as part of the New York, Brooklyn and Manhattan Beach Railway; the B&RB owned the section of that line between Jefferson Street and East New York, though this section was solely operated by the NYB&MB. The line was single-tracked until 1894.

The Canarsie Railroad was chartered on May 8, 1906, as a BRT subsidiary (leased to the Brooklyn Union Elevated Railroad) and acquired the line on May 31, 1906. The line was partly elevated, and electrified with third rail on the elevated part and trolley wire on the rest, south of New Lots Avenue. The Long Island Rail Road, which had used the line north of New Lots to access their Bay Ridge Branch, built a new line just to the west, and acquired the rest of the line north from there. The East New York terminus was extended several blocks along a section of line formerly used for "East New York Loop" service to the Fulton Street Elevated and the Broadway Elevated (now the BMT Jamaica Line), at a point known as Manhattan Junction (now Broadway Junction).

Service first ran on July 28, 1906, from Canarsie Landing to the Broadway Ferry at the foot of Broadway in Williamsburg, at the East River. This route still exists as the BMT Jamaica Line, except for the last piece to the East River, where the Jamaica Line runs over the Williamsburg Bridge. The route was later extended over the bridge and along the BMT Nassau Street Line to Canal Street and then Chambers Street.

=== Dual Contracts rebuilding ===
The Dual Contracts subway expansion scheme was formalized in early 1913, specifying new lines or expansions to be built by the Interborough Rapid Transit Company and the BRT. It saw the rebuilding of the complex train junction at Manhattan Junction into an even more complex flyover junction now known as Broadway Junction. The expansion extended south to the point at which the Canarsie and Fulton Street Elevateds diverged, including a six-track, three-platform station at Atlantic Avenue. The complex was rebuilt under traffic and opened in stages, reaching completion in 1919.

At the same time, the BRT moved to eliminate remaining operations that required elevated trains to operate under overhead wire. In most cases this meant using third rail on fully grade-separated lines. When third rail was extended on the Canarsie Line it was decided to extend this power mode only as far as the important station at Rockaway Parkway and Glenwood Road. Beyond that point, frequent grade crossings made third rail impractical. This portion of the line was converted to the Canarsie Shuttle using elevated cars in October 1917 and converted to trolley cars on October 18, 1920.

One grade crossing was retained at East 105th Street despite the third rail, and was the last public rapid transit grade crossing in New York City. It was closed by 1973 as part of the Flatlands Industrial Park project, which was built on either side of the ground-level Canarsie Line. A pedestrian overpass above the tracks was built to replace the grade crossing.

=== 14th Street–Eastern Line ===
==== Initial subway ====
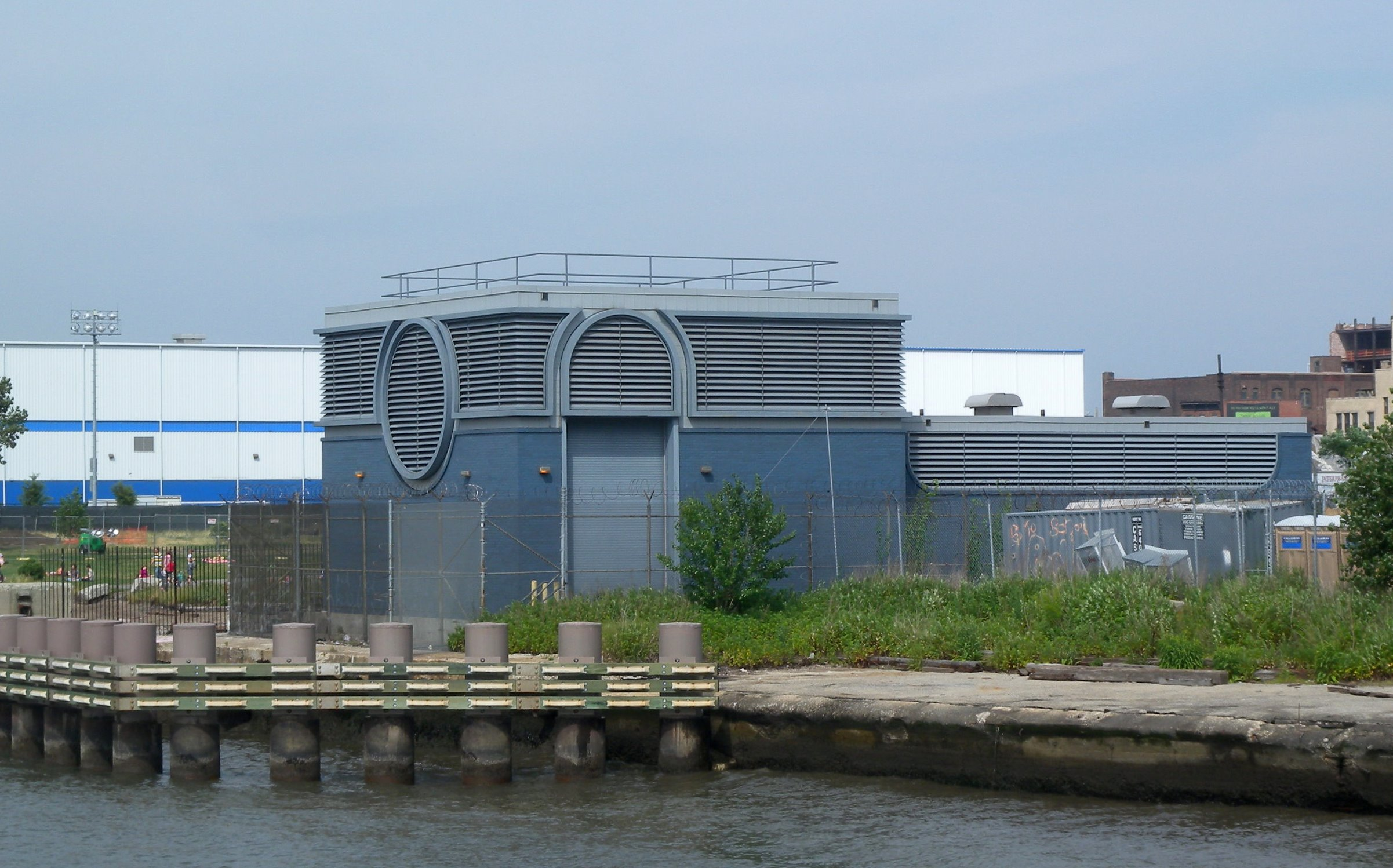
Fan house for tunnel

The Dual Contracts also called for a subway line initially known as the 14th Street–Eastern District Line, usually shortened to 14th Street–Eastern Line. The line would run beneath 14th Street in Manhattan, from Sixth Avenue under the East River and through Williamsburg to Montrose and Bushwick Avenues in Brooklyn. In late 1915, the Public Service Commission began receiving bids for the construction of the 14th Street Line. Booth and Flinn was awarded the first contract for the line—section 3, comprising the tunnel under the East River—on January 13, 1916. At the time, the Public Service Commission was completing plans for the rest of the line.

A groundbreaking ceremony was held on April 8, 1916. The commission began accepting bids for the next two sections of the line, sections 1 and 2 in Manhattan, in April 1916. The next month, the commission reviewed bids for section 4, running from Bedford Avenue to Manhattan Avenue in Brooklyn; Mason and Hanger submitted a low bid of $1.847 million for this section. The commission also reviewed bids for section 1, awarding a contract for that section to Booth and Flinn. That June, the Degnon Construction Company received a $1.972 million contract to construct section 2 of the line, from Irving Place to Avenue B in Manhattan. MacArthur Brothers Co. received a $1.336 million contract for the construction of section 5 in Brooklyn.

The 14th Street Tunnel under the East River had been fully excavated by August 1919. The line's opening was delayed by several years. In 1922, Mayor John Francis Hylan blocked some construction contracts, claiming that the costs were excessively high. The Station Finish Corporation was contracted to build the stations in Brooklyn and the Charles H. Brown & Son Corporation was contracted to build the stations in Manhattan. Track-laying in the tunnels between Sixth and Montrose Avenues started in the last week of October 1922.

Due to the city's failure to approve the section of the line between Montrose Avenue and East New York, the 14th Street/Eastern Line was initially isolated from the rest of the system. In 1924, a temporary connection was built from the Long Island Rail Road (LIRR)'s Bushwick Yard that ran via Montrose Avenue and then connected to the 14th Street/Eastern Line under Bushwick Avenue just near the Montrose Avenue station. This was done to allow the delivery of BMT Standard subway cars. The first of the cars were delivered by this ramp on June 20, 1924. On June 30, 1924, the section between Sixth Avenue in Manhattan and Montrose Avenue in Brooklyn opened. The terminal in Brooklyn was close to the Bushwick station of the Long Island Rail Road's Bushwick Branch. Initial service was provided by three-car trains running every seven and a half minutes. The line collected 9,196 fares in its first day of operation, which constituted its entire ridership for the fiscal year ending June 30, 1924. Ridership rose from 15 million in fiscal 1925 to 23 million in fiscal 1928.

==== Extensions ====
For the extension of the 14th Street/Eastern Line from Montrose Avenue to East New York, the New York City Board of Estimate had initially given its consent to an elevated line over the Evergreen Branch of the LIRR. The Board of Estimate subsequently refused to allow a construction contract for the elevated line, while the BRT did not want to build an underground line. The extension was changed to an underground alignment following opposition from industries on the Evergreen Branch. In July 1924, the New York City Board of Transportation (BOT) approved a modified route for recommendation to the Board of Estimate. The route would be wholly underground and consist of three tracks. From Montrose Avenue, it would curve east under McKibbin Street, private property, and Harrison Place. Past Varick Avenue, it would turn southeast to Wyckoff Avenue, underneath which it would run to Eldert Street. This plan was to cost $8 million.

In September 1924, the BOT approved the remaining section of the route between Eldert Street and Broadway Junction in East New York. East of Eldert Street, the route would turn south to a ground-level alignment parallel to the LIRR's Bay Ridge Branch, then run southeast in a tunnel underneath private property to the intersection of Eastern Parkway and Bushwick Avenue, where it would emerge onto a ramp leading to the existing Canarsie elevated. An ornamental viaduct over Bushwick Avenue and Eastern Parkway was removed from the original plans due to opposition from property owners who called it a "Chinese wall". The BOT also dropped a plan to have a connection from the new subway extension to the Jamaica Line to and from 168th Street, since adding such a connection would slow the movement of trains. This route was adopted by the Board of Estimate the following month. Three contracts for the construction of the extension were awarded in December at a total cost of $9,531,204. The section from Montrose Avenue to Varick Avenue was awarded to the Underpinning and Foundation Company, while the section from Varick Avenue to Bleecker Street and from Bleecker Street to Halsey Street went to the Oakdale Contracting Company.

Another delay occurred in November 1925 regarding the alignment of the 14th Street/Eastern Line along a three-block section from Cooper Street to Central Avenue, which was to parallel the Bay Ridge Branch. This section, near what is now the Wilson Avenue station, was to run between the LIRR tracks to the west and the Cemetery of the Evergreens and the Most Holy Trinity Cemetery to the east. This section would contain portals for the subway to rise to ground level on either side of the Wilson Avenue station, with space separating the LIRR and subway tracks. However, the LIRR said it needed the space for overhead electrification poles as a result of the Kaufman Act and that these poles would prevent the construction of the subway portals. In January 1926, the Oakdale Contracting Company submitted a low bid of $1,345,778 for the section from Halsey Street to Cooper Street.

On July 14, 1928, the line was extended further east beneath Wyckoff Avenue and then south paralleling the Bay Ridge Branch to a new station at Broadway Junction, above the existing station on the Broadway Elevated (Jamaica Line). At this time, it was connected to the Canarsie Line. At noon on May 30, 1931, a two-block extension to Eighth Avenue in Manhattan was opened, allowing passengers to transfer to the new IND Eighth Avenue Line. This station was built to look like the other Independent Subway stations. At this point, the Canarsie Line's route took the shape that it still has to this day.

=== Mid- to late 20th century ===
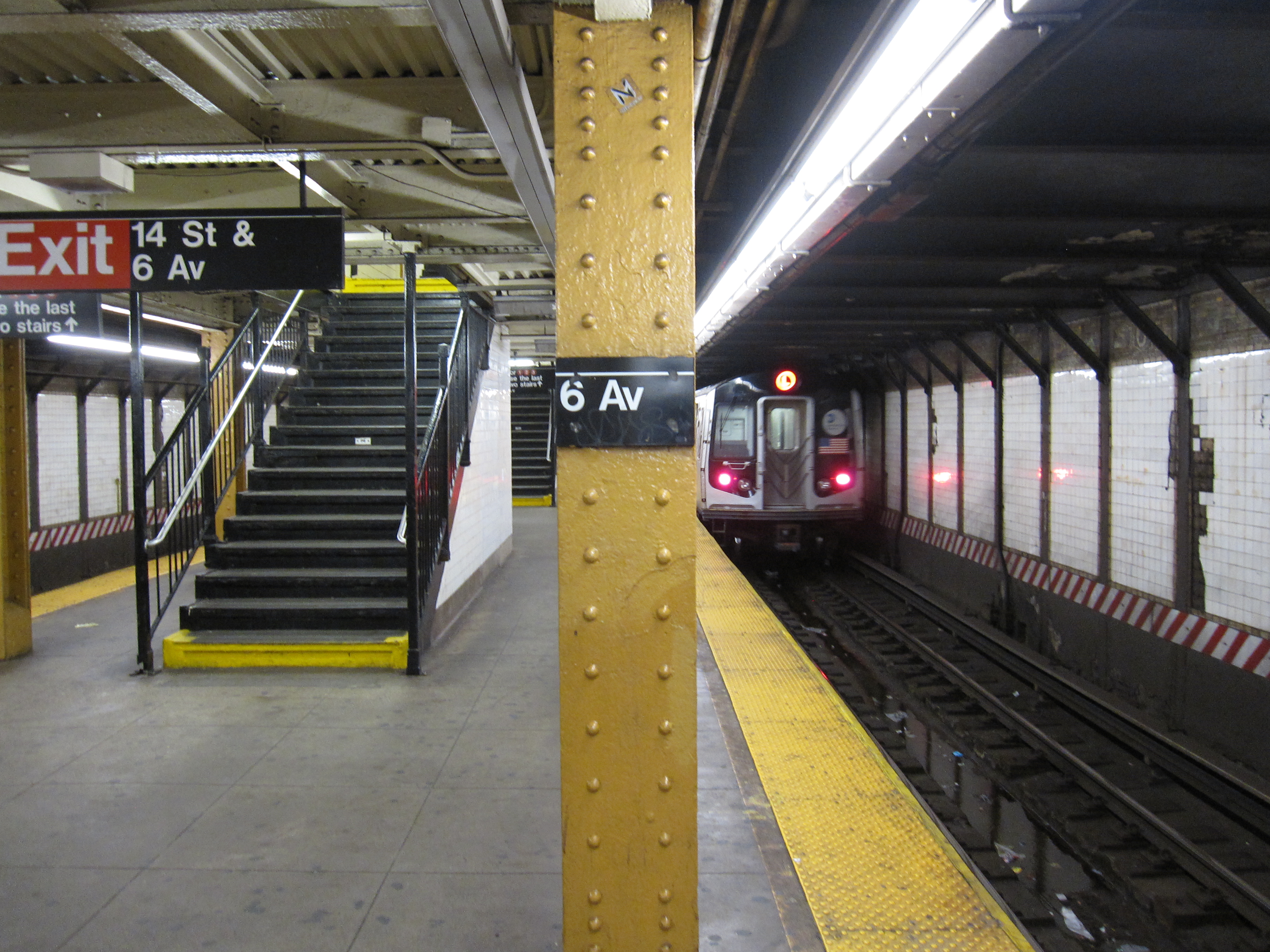
Sixth Avenue station

Express service operated along the line along the local track, skipping all stops between Myrtle Avenue and Lorimer Street. This service pattern stopped in August 1956.

On November 23, 1942, the Canarsie Shuttle trolley service to Canarsie Landing was withdrawn, the 1.5 miles (2.4 km)-long right-of-way was abandoned. It was replaced by the parallel Rockaway Parkway trolley line, which was rerouted to serve the former shuttle's Rockaway Parkway and Canarsie Landing stations. This Rockaway Parkway trolley was in turn replaced by the B42 bus on April 29, 1951. Parts of the former Canarsie Line right-of-way were built over, and other parts can still be seen as broad alleys or narrow parking lots. The line ran between East 95th and East 96th Streets as far south as Seaview Avenue. Some trolley poles from the line still exist, but the line's right-of-way was destroyed by developments in the area.

=== Early 21st century upgrades ===
==== Automation and post-automation ====
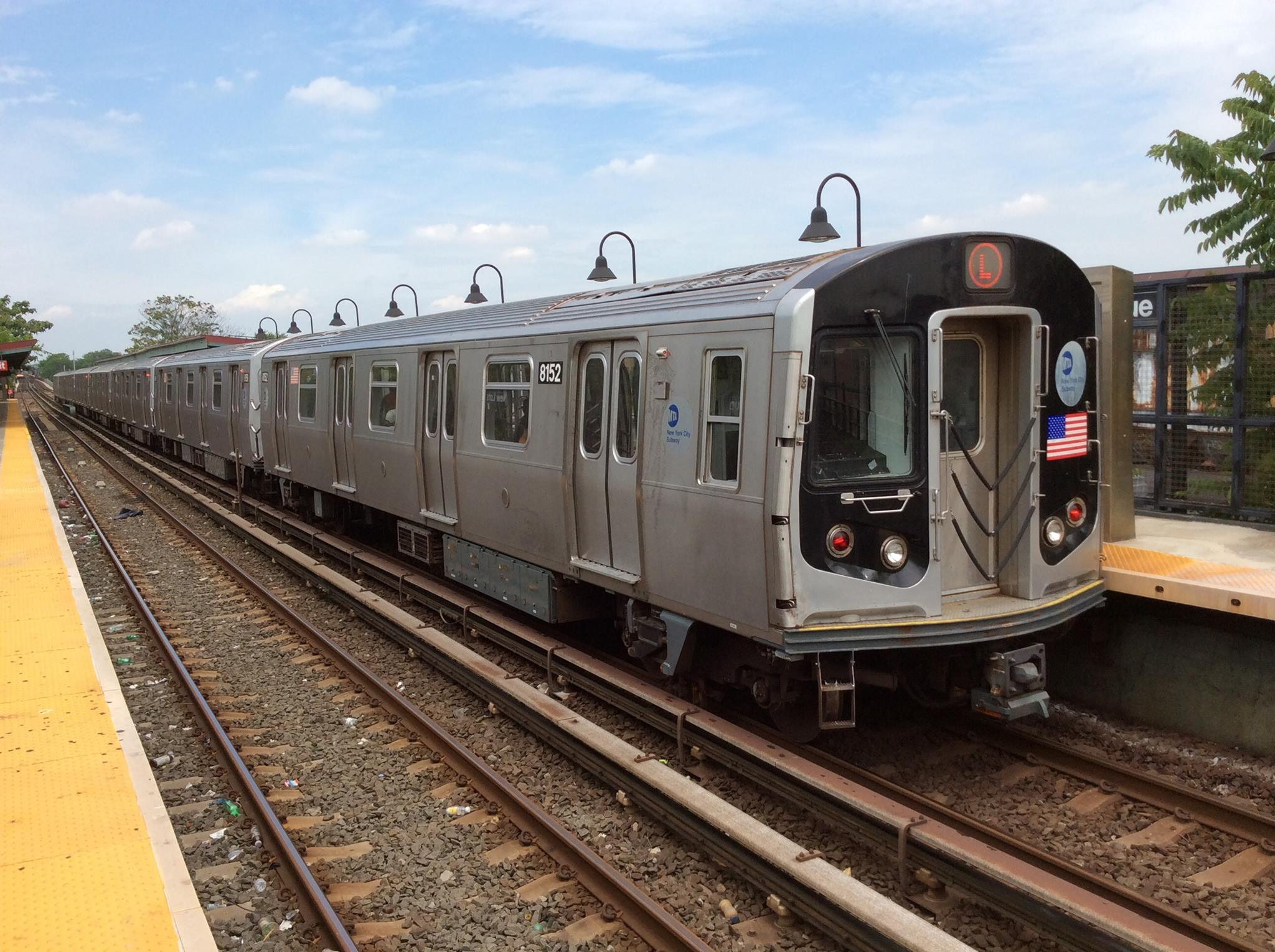
The automation of the Canarsie Line required the purchase of the R143 orders on the L route, which runs on the Canarsie Line.

The Canarsie Line is one of only two New York City non-shuttle subway lines that hosts only a single service and does not share operating trackage with any other line or service; the other is the IRT Flushing Line, carrying the 7 and <7> trains. Because of this, it was chosen as the location of the first fully automated line of the New York City Subway. The automation project was among the first in the world to use a radio frequency-based system. The plans for installation were laid out between 1999 and 2002. Communications-based train control (CBTC) was installed in pieces between 2003 and January 2006: the elevated section of the line south of Broadway Junction was completed first, followed by the underground section north of Broadway Junction. The project cost $340 million, with $78 million of it used to upgrade track interlockings on the line.

In spring 2005, the current CBTC-enabled R143-class equipment was expected to run under full automation with a single operator (known as OPTO, or One Person Train Operation) acting as an attendant to monitor the train's operation and take over manual operation if necessary. However, technical mishaps including the test train rolling away by itself delayed the start of automatic train operation. The project caused numerous service disruptions on the L at night and on weekends. Frequently, service was shut down in separate sections of the line, usually from Eighth Avenue to Lorimer Street, Lorimer to Broadway Junction, or Broadway Junction to Rockaway Parkway. During this time, shuttle buses served suspended areas. This project also required the temporary closing of some stations, either in one direction or both directions, and for the line to be operated in two sections.

In June 2005, the Canarsie Line ran full-length 480 feet (150 m) trains with a single operator on weekends. However, as this was a violation of union contracts – which stipulated that there must be one operator per 300 feet (91 m) of train – the MTA was ordered to resume two-person operation at all times.

The system became operational as of February 2009. Automation was achieved with the R143s assigned exclusively to the L, but since the R160As were not CBTC-compatible until August 2010, some trains were manually operated alongside automatically driven trains. The L fully began automatic train operation in early 2012. The CBTC installation increased the train capacity on the line from 20 trains per hour (tph) to 24 tph, as well as permitted the installation of countdown clocks, which show the amount of time until the next train arrives. By 2025, the original CBTC equipment was nearing the end of its 25-year useful life, and the original CBTC system's computer servers, radios, and software were planned to be upgraded.

==== 14th Street Tunnel shutdown ====
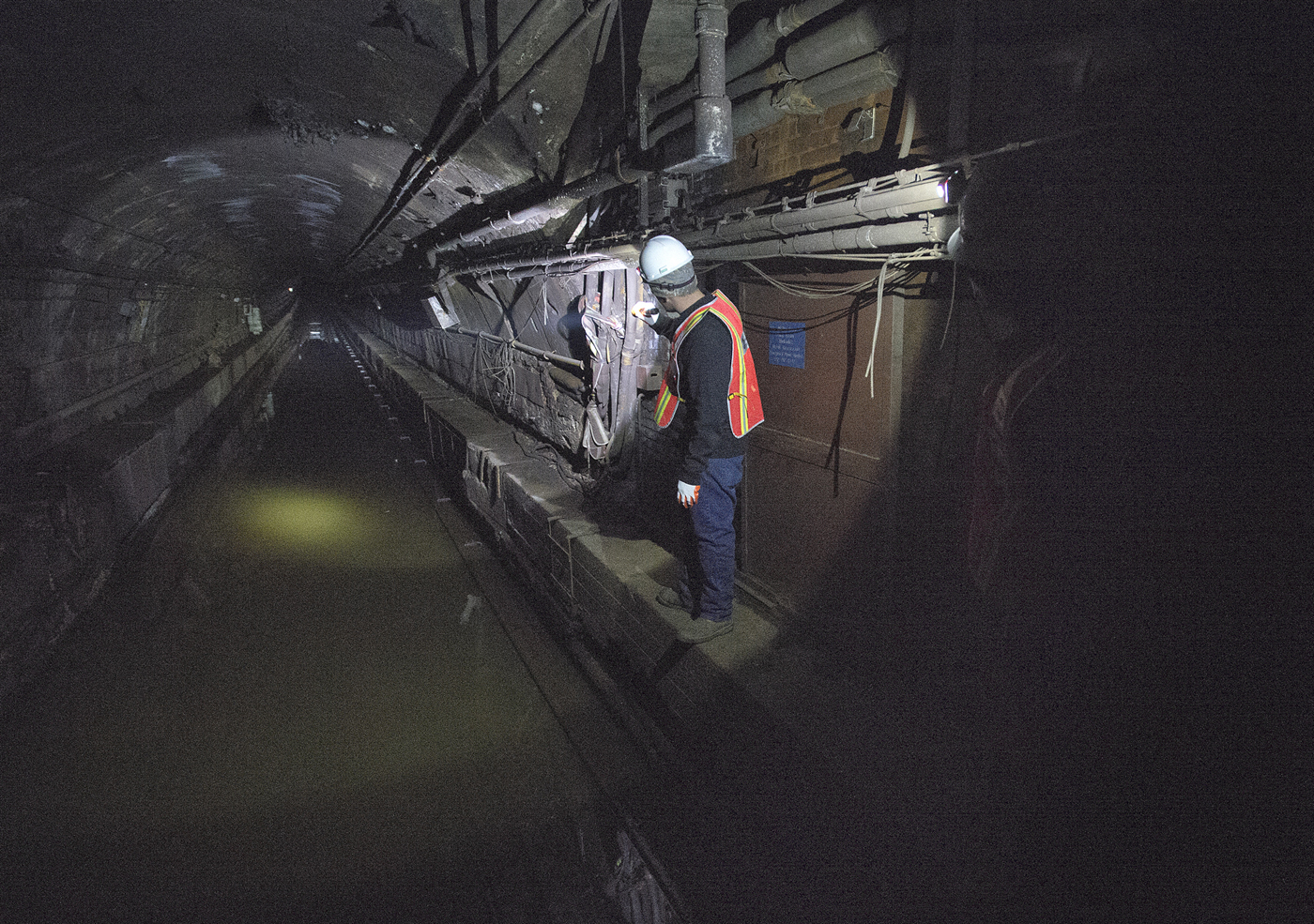
Tunnels flooded by Hurricane Sandy

In January 2016, the BMT Canarsie Line between Bedford and Eighth Avenues was proposed for a partial or full shutdown so that the MTA could repair tunnels damaged by Hurricane Sandy in 2012. The repairs are slated to start in April 2019 and would replace damaged communications, power and signal wires, third rails and tracks, duct banks, pump rooms, circuit breaker houses, tunnel lighting, concrete lining, and fire protection systems.

The renovations would cost between $800 million and $1 billion. There were two options: a partial closure for three years or a full closure for 18 months. It was later announced that the MTA had chosen the 18-month full closure option. To provide alternate service, the MTA devised preliminary mitigation plans in which it proposed adding shuttle bus, ferry, and subway service; adding bus and high-occupancy vehicle lanes; extending train routes; and providing free or improved transfers. The MTA named Judlau Contracting and TC Electric as the project's contractors on April 3, 2017. At this time, the duration of the shutdown was shortened to 15 months, so the shutdown would begin in April instead of in January. In June 2018, as part of a lawsuit settlement, additional changes were made to the shutdown mitigation plans.

The shutdown was expected to begin on April 27, 2019. In January 2019, the shutdown was changed to limited closures between Third Avenue and Bedford Avenue on late nights and weekends. It was expected to last about 15 to 20 months. On April 26, 2020, New York governor Andrew Cuomo announced the completion of the project, months ahead of schedule.

== Service patterns ==
Service patterns over this line have varied little through the years; initially, trains ran over the Broadway Elevated from the ferry in Williamsburg (later extended into Manhattan), through Manhattan Junction and on to Canarsie. Then when the subway opened, two services ran from Canarsie to Manhattan: the original route on the Broadway Elevated and the route to 14th Street as the 14th Street-Canarsie Line.

In 1936, due to the institution of new lightweight subway-elevated equipment, a new rush-hour-only service was inaugurated from Eighth Avenue and 14th Street to Lefferts Boulevard at the east end of the Liberty Avenue Elevated (the continuation of the Fulton Street Elevated). The Eighth Avenue–Canarsie route was given BMT marker 16, and trains running to Lefferts Boulevard usually were marked as 13. When the Fulton Street El was torn down, some rush-hour Broadway trains ran through from the Broadway Elevated (Jamaica Line) to Canarsie via the flyover at Broadway Junction; these were marked as 14. By 1967, when all BMT services had been given letters, the 16, which used the full Canarsie Line, was designated as LL. The rush-hour Broadway service (14) was designated JJ. The JJ ran until 1968 when it was replaced by the KK which stayed on the Jamaica Line instead of switching to the Canarsie Line at Broadway Junction. The flyover connection has not been used by any regular revenue service since then.

=== Skip-stop service proposal ===
In January 1991, skip-stop service was proposed to speed service during the height of rush hours in the peak direction which would have reduced the running time from 41 minutes to 37 minutes. Under this plan, the K designation, which was previously used as the Broadway Brooklyn Local from 1967 to 1976, and as the Eighth Avenue Local from 1985 to 1988, would be repurposed and would appear in a gray bullet similar to the color the L uses. Both services would have common stops at Rockaway Parkway, Broadway Junction (then called Eastern Parkway), Myrtle Avenue, Lorimer Street, First Avenue, Union Square, Sixth Avenue and Eighth Avenue. L trains would stop at East 105th Street, Livonia Avenue, Atlantic Avenue, Wilson Avenue, DeKalb Avenue, Morgan Avenue, Grand Street, and Bedford Avenue; K trains would stop at New Lots Avenue, Sutter Avenue, Bushwick Avenue–Aberdeen Street, Halsey Street, Jefferson Street, Montrose Avenue, Graham Avenue and Third Avenue. This change was proposed as a service improvement alongside other changes that would have either reduced or eliminated service to balance the MTA's operational budget and would have been implemented in October 1991, pending approval from the MTA board.

== Station listing ==
Station service legend
| Stops all times | Stops 24 hours a day |
| Stops all times except late nights | Stops every day during daytime hours only |
| Stops weekdays during the day | Stops during weekday daytime hours only |
| Stops rush hours in the peak direction only | Stops during weekday rush hours in the peak direction only |
Time period details
| Disabled access | Station is compliant with the Americans with Disabilities Act |
| ↑ | Station is compliant with the Americans with Disabilities Act in the indicated direction only |
| ↓ | Station is compliant with the Americans with Disabilities Act in the indicated direction only |
| | Elevator access to mezzanine only |

| Neighborhood (approximate) | Disabled access | Station | Opened | Transfers and notes |
|---|---|---|---|---|
Manhattan
| Chelsea | Disabled access | Eighth Avenue | May 30, 1931 | A C E (IND Eighth Avenue Line); M14A / M14D Select Bus Service |
| Chelsea | Disabled access | Sixth Avenue | June 30, 1924 | F <F> M (IND Sixth Avenue Line at 14th Street); 1 2 3 (IRT Broadway–Seventh Avenue Line at 14th Street); Connection to PATH at 14th Street; M14A / M14D Select Bus Service |
| Union Square | Disabled access | Union Square | June 30, 1924 | N Q R W (BMT Broadway Line); 4 5 6 <6> (IRT Lexington Avenue Line); M14A / M14D Select Bus Service |
| East Village | | Third Avenue | June 30, 1924 | M14A / M14D Select Bus Service |
| East Village | Disabled access | First Avenue | June 30, 1924 | M14A / M14D Select Bus Service; Northbound M15 Select Bus Service |
Brooklyn
14th Street Tunnel under the East River
| Williamsburg | Disabled access | Bedford Avenue | June 30, 1924 | |
| Williamsburg | Disabled access | Lorimer Street | June 30, 1924 | G (IND Crosstown Line at Metropolitan Avenue) |
| Williamsburg | | Graham Avenue | June 30, 1924 | |
| Williamsburg | Disabled access | Grand Street | June 30, 1924 | |
| East Williamsburg | | Montrose Avenue | June 30, 1924 | |
| East Williamsburg | | Morgan Avenue | July 14, 1928 | |
| Bushwick | | Jefferson Street | July 14, 1928 | |
| Bushwick | | DeKalb Avenue | July 14, 1928 | |
| Bushwick/ Ridgewood | Disabled access | Myrtle–Wyckoff Avenues | July 14, 1928 | M (BMT Myrtle Avenue Line) originally Myrtle Avenue |
| Bushwick/ Ridgewood | | Halsey Street | July 14, 1928 | |
| Bushwick | ↑ | Wilson Avenue | July 14, 1928 | Station is ADA-accessible in the northbound direction only. |
| Bushwick | | Bushwick Avenue–Aberdeen Street | July 14, 1928 | |
| East New York | | Broadway Junction | July 14, 1928 | J Z (BMT Jamaica Line); A C (IND Fulton Street Line) |
| East New York | connecting tracks to BMT Jamaica Line (no regular service) | | | |
| East New York | connecting track to East New York Yard | | | |
| East New York/Brownsville | | Atlantic Avenue | July 28, 1906 | Connection to LIRR at East New York |
| East New York/Brownsville | | Sutter Avenue | July 28, 1906 | |
| East New York/Brownsville | Disabled access | Livonia Avenue | July 28, 1906 | MetroCard/OMNY transfer to IRT New Lots Line (3 4 ) at Junius Street |
| East New York/Brownsville | connecting track to Linden Shops (No third rail; diesel work trains only) | | | |
| East New York/Brownsville | | New Lots Avenue | July 28, 1906 | originally New Lots Road; B15 bus to JFK Airport |
| Canarsie | | East 105th Street | July 28, 1906 | original surface station, modified to high-level island platform c.1906 |
| Canarsie | connecting tracks to Canarsie Yard | | | |
| Canarsie | Disabled access | Canarsie–Rockaway Parkway | July 28, 1906 | original surface station, extensively rebuilt as terminal station free out-of-station transfer to B42 bus B82 Select Bus Service |
| Canarsie | | Flatlands Avenue | | line abandoned; station demolished; eventually replaced by B42 bus service |
| Canarsie | | Avenue L | | line abandoned; station demolished; eventually replaced by B42 bus service |
| Canarsie | | Canarsie Pier | | line abandoned; station demolished; eventually replaced by B42 bus service |
