= Leon Williams (American football) =

American football player (born 1983)

No. 94, 52, 57, 53
- Position: Linebacker

Personal information
- Born: July 30, 1983 (age 43); Brooklyn, New York City, U.S.
- Listed height: 6 ft 3 in (1.91 m)
- Listed weight: 248 lb (112 kg)

Career information
- High school: Canarsie (Brooklyn)
- College: Miami (FL)
- NFL draft: 2006: 4th round, 110th overall pick

Career history
- Cleveland Browns (2006−2009); New York Sentinels (2009); Dallas Cowboys (2010); Kansas City Chiefs (2012)

Awards and highlights
- BCS national champion (2001)

Career NFL statistics
- Total tackles: 173
- Sacks: 5.0
- Forced fumbles: 1
- Fumble recoveries: 1
- Stats at Pro Football Reference

Leon E'srom Williams (born July 30, 1983) is an American former professional football player who was a linebacker for the Cleveland Browns, Dallas Cowboys and Kansas City Chiefs of the National Football League (NFL). He played college football for the Miami Hurricanes and was selected by the Browns in the fourth round of the 2006 NFL draft. Williams was also a member of the New York Sentinels of the United Football League (UFL).

== Early life ==
A native of Brooklyn, New York City where he attended Canarsie High School in Brooklyn, New York, he played high school football for the Chiefs under coach Mike Camerdese and graduated in 2001.

As a junior, he played tight end, catching and 20 passes for 219 yards and 3 touchdowns. As a senior, he was moved to linebacker, collecting 98 tackles, 12 sacks, 4 fumble recoveries and 3 interceptions.

Williams was named USA Today 1st team All American and awarded Gatorade Player of the Year in 2000-01 (NY). SuperPrep All-American and a member of SuperPrep's Elite 50 top national prospects...No. 27 prospect overall, regardless of position. He also participated in the first-ever U.S. Army All-American Bowl game on December 30, 2000, and was named Defensive player of the game.

== College career ==
Williams accepted a football scholarship from the University of Miami. As a redshirt freshman, he was a backup middle linebacker and played on special teams. He had 14 tackles (nine solos). As a sophomore, he appeared in all 13 games, tallying 23 tackles (one for loss).

As a junior in 2004, he was a Butkus Award finalist and was considered the heir apparent to Jonathan Vilma. He started at middle linebacker in the season opener against Florida State University, making 3 tackles before suffering a hand injury. He missed the next two games. He appeared in 10 games with 5 starts, making 56 tackles (8 for loss), 2.5 sacks, one pass defensed, one forced fumble and one fumble recovery.

As a senior in 2005, he was a Butkus Award semi-finalist. He started in every game at middle linebacker, posting 54 tackles (3.5 for loss), 2 pass defensed and one fumble recovery. He contributed to the team ranking fourth in the nation in total defense, allowing 270.1 yards-per-game.

He finished his college career with 47 games, 146 tackles (12. 5 tackles for loss), 2.5 sacks, 4 pass defensed, 36 special teams tackles, one forced fumble and one fumble recovery. He was an Arts and Science major.

== Professional career ==
Pre-draft measurables
| Height | Weight | Arm length | Hand span | 40-yard dash | 10-yard split | 20-yard split | 20-yard shuttle | Three-cone drill | Vertical jump | Broad jump | Bench press |
|---|---|---|---|---|---|---|---|---|---|---|---|
| 6 ft 3 in (1.91 m) | 245 lb (111 kg) | 32 in (0.81 m) | 9 1/2 in (0.24 m) | 4.56 s | 1.56 s | 2.67 s | 4.05 s | 7.06 s | 34.0 in (0.86 m) | 9 ft 9 in (2.97 m) | 25 reps |
All values from NFL Combine/Pro Day

=== Cleveland Browns ===
Williams was selected by the Cleveland Browns in the fourth round (110th overall) of the 2006 NFL draft. As a rookie, he played in 16 regular season games with 3 starts, registering 37 tackles, one sack, 2 quarterback hurries, 16 special teams tackles (fourth on the team), 2 passes defensed and one forced fumble. He made his NFL debut at the Cincinnati Bengals on 17 September. His 17 tackles versus the Tampa Bay Buccaneers on 24 December were a career-high.

In 2007, he started 9 out of 16 games as a backup linebacker, making 90 tackles (fifth on the team) and 4 sacks (tied for second on the team). He had 13 tackles against the Baltimore Ravens. In 2008, he appeared in 14 games as a backup linebacker and tallied 42 tackles. The Browns waived him on September 15, 2009.

=== New York Sentinels ===
In 2009, he was signed by the New York Sentinels of the United Football League.

=== Dallas Cowboys ===
On January 12, 2010, he signed a future contract with the Dallas Cowboys. He was placed on the injured reserve list with a hamstring injury on December 31. He appeared in 11 games, making 6 defensive tackles, 8 special teams tackles (eighth on the team) and one fumble recovery. He wasn't re-signed after the season.

=== Kansas City Chiefs ===
On May 16, 2012, Williams signed with the Kansas City Chiefs. He was cut prior to the 2012 season but was again signed by the team on December 6. He appeared in 4 games and wasn't re-signed after the season.
