= B42 (New York City bus) =

Bus route in Brooklyn, New York

b42
- Rockaway Parkway Line
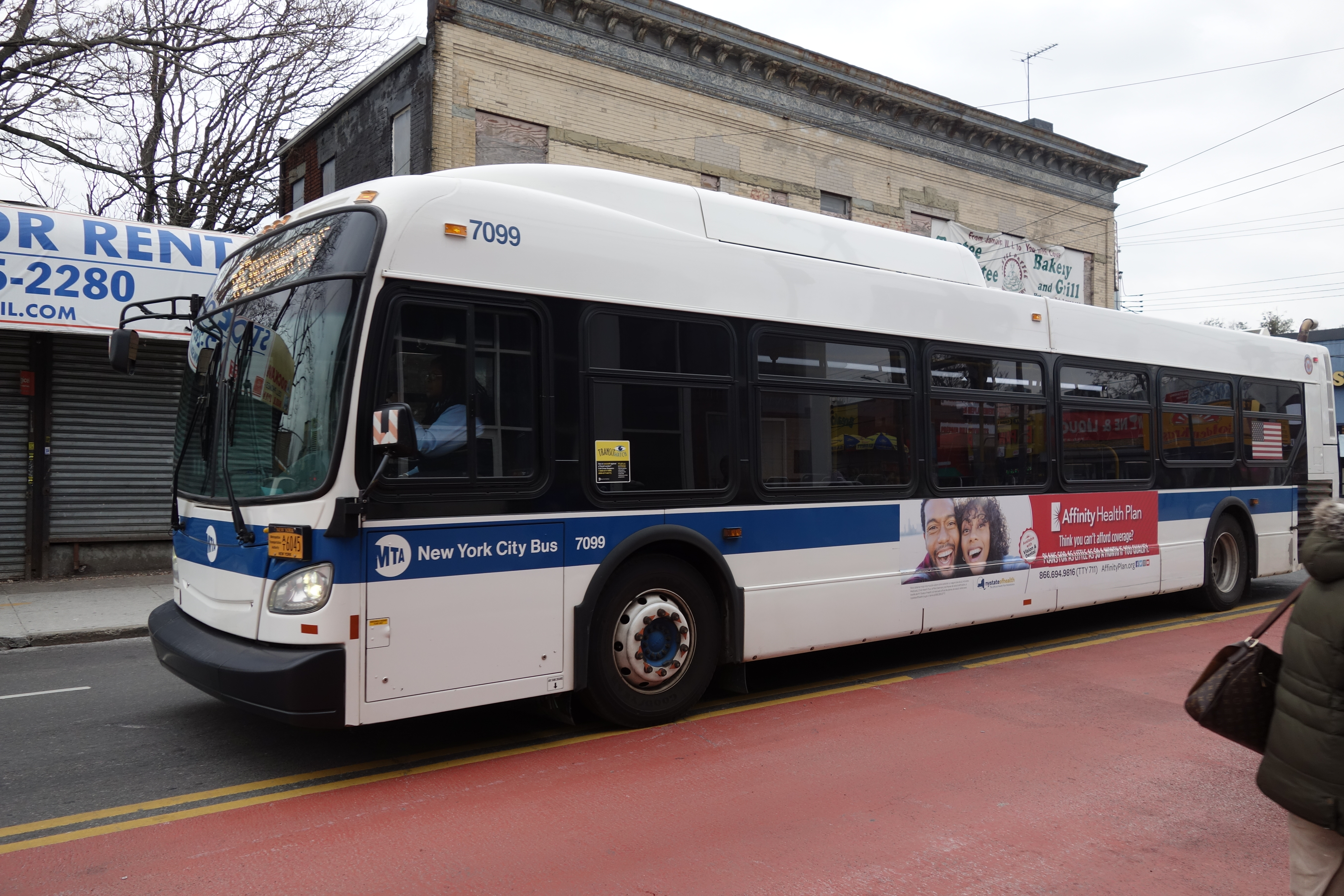
- A 2014 XD40 (7099) on the Rockaway Parkway station-bound B42 at Rockaway Parkway/Glenwood Road in January 2019.

Overview
- System: MTA Regional Bus Operations
- Operator: New York City Transit Authority
- Garage: East New York Depot
- Vehicle: New Flyer Xcelsior XD40; New Flyer Xcelsior XDE40; New Flyer Xcelsior XE40; OBI Orion VII NG HEV
- Began service: 1917 (streetcar); 1951 (bus)

Route
- Locale: Brooklyn, New York, U.S.
- Start: Rockaway Parkway
- Via: Rockaway Parkway
- End: Canarsie Pier
- Length: 1.3 miles (2.1 km) (entire route)

Service
- Operates: All times
- Ridership: 352,046 (2025)
- Timetable: B42

The Rockaway Parkway Line is a public transit line in Brooklyn, New York City, running mostly along Rockaway Parkway between Canarsie Pier and the Canarsie–Rockaway Parkway terminal of the BMT Canarsie Line of the New York City Subway. Originally a streetcar line, it is now the B42 bus route, operated by the New York City Transit Authority.

The Wilson Avenue Line (now the B60 bus) continues north on Rockaway Parkway from the end of the B42 to Williamsburg.

== History ==
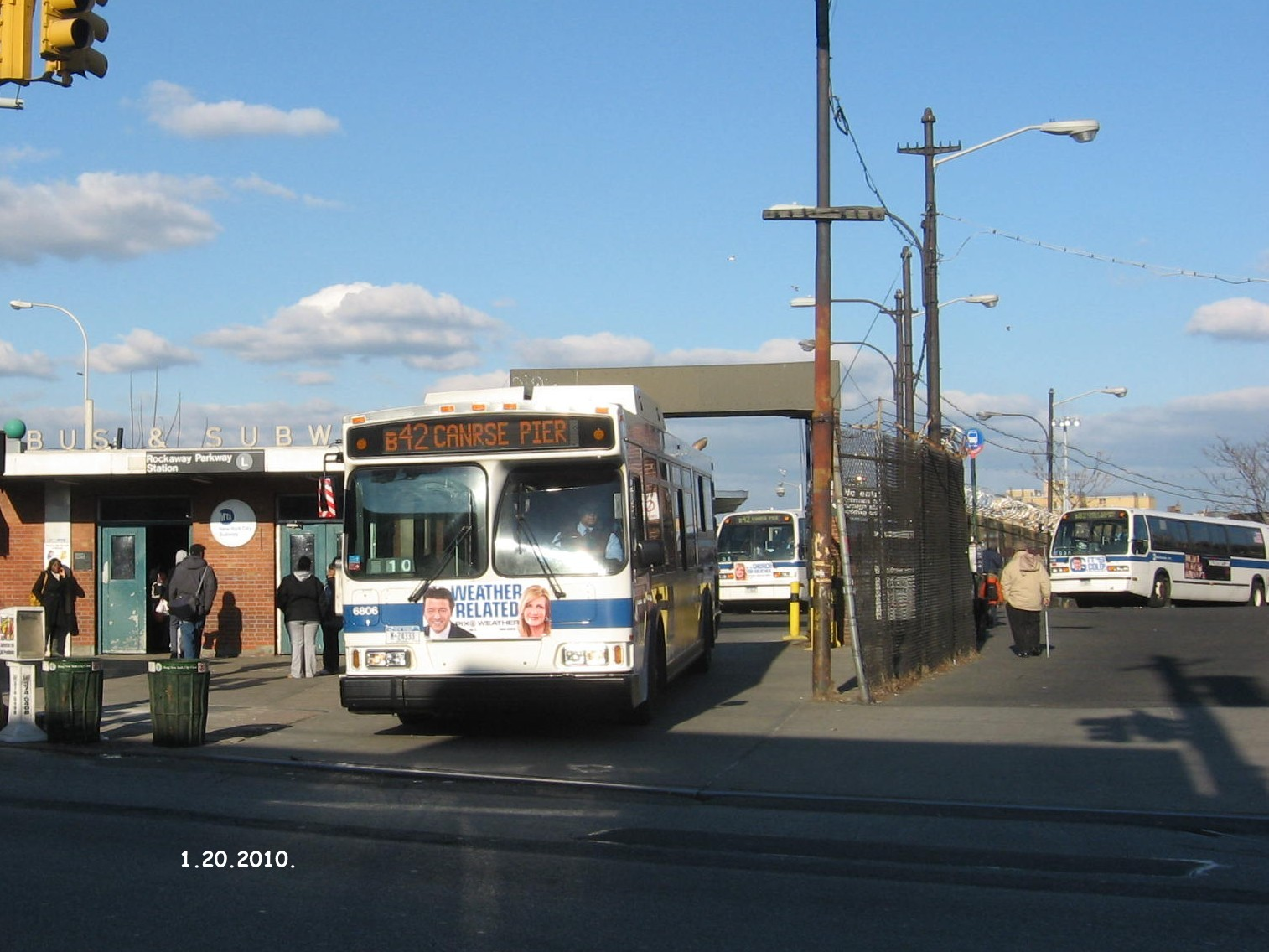
A 2007 Orion VII OG HEV (6806) on the Canarsie Pier-bound B42 leaving the Rockaway Parkway subway station

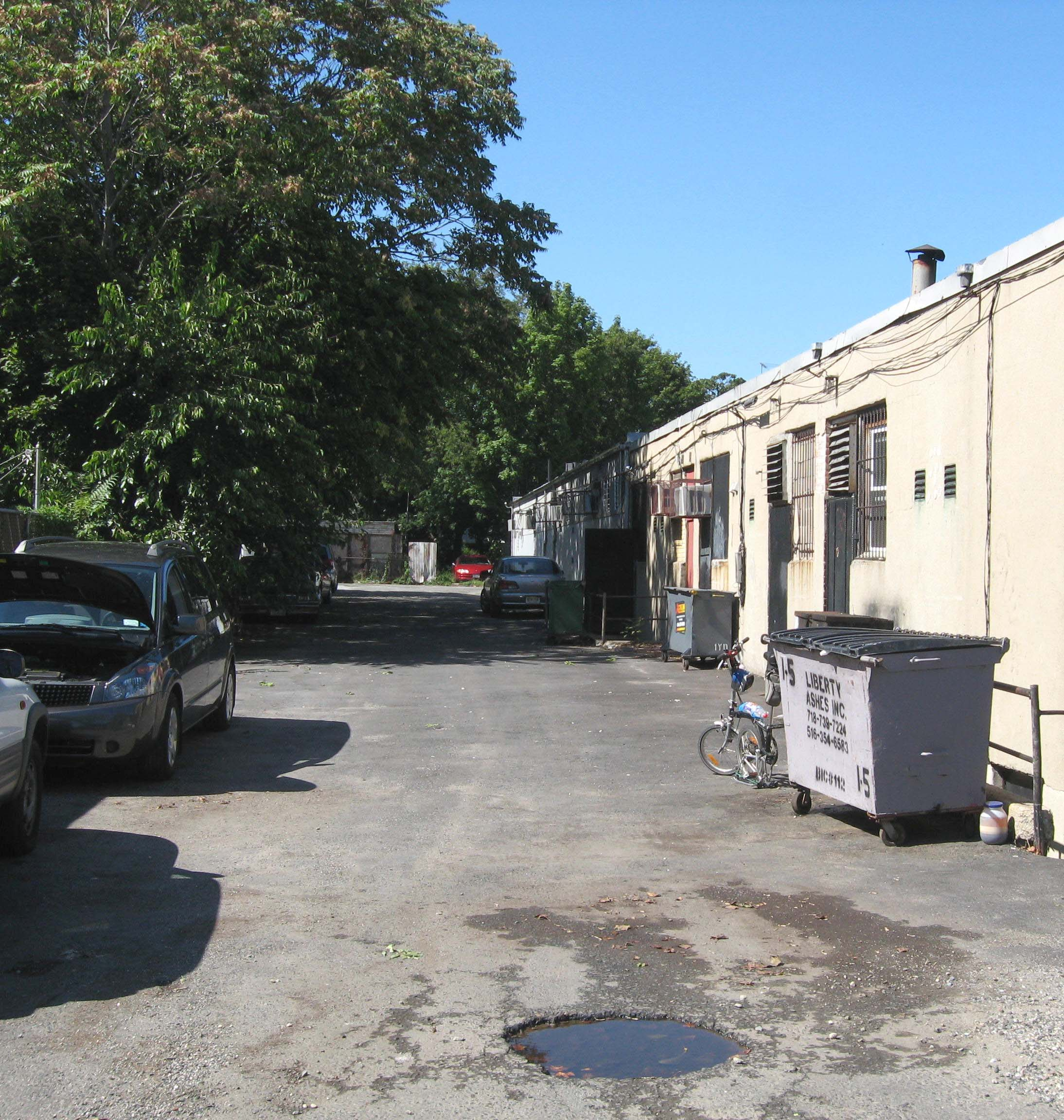
Former private ROW

The line was originally operated as an electric streetcar by the Nassau Electric Railroad, a company that became part of the Brooklyn Rapid Transit (BRT) Company system, subsequently reorganized as the Brooklyn and Queens Transit Corporation in 1928 before passing to city ownership in 1940.

Initially cars were through-routed between Williamsburg and Canarsie Pier via the Wilson Avenue Line (then Hamburg Avenue) and Rockaway Parkway. It was later cut at the company's Canarsie Depot at the corner of Hegeman and Rockaway Avenues, running via Rockaway Avenue and Rockaway Parkway to the Canarsie Pier. At the Canarsie Line rapid transit station at Rockaway Parkway and Glenwood Road, the Rockaway Parkway Line crossed the rapid transit line's surface right-of-way. The rapid transit line then turned east on private-right-of-way to parallel the trolley line to the shore and ferry.

In October 1917, the elevated train service was truncated at the Rockaway Parkway station, when the BRT moved to eliminate remaining operations that required elevated trains to operate under overhead wire. At first, a shuttle elevated train service, and from October 18, 1920 a shuttle trolley operated on the former surface elevated line trackage, but the BRT did not discontinue the largely parallel Rockaway Parkway Line.

Under city ownership, the trolley shuttle on the former elevated line's right-of-way was abandoned on November 21, 1942. On the same day, the terminals of the Wilson Avenue and Rockaway Parkway lines were changed from the Canarsie Depot to the Rockaway Parkway station, essentially turning the Rockaway Parkway Line into a replacement for the Canarsie Line shuttle trolley. At the Canarsie Pier end of the line, the Rockaway Parkway trolleys were rerouted via St. Jude Place and Canarsie Road in order to access the former shuttle station at the shore.

In recognition of the fact that the Rockaway Parkway Line was replacing the survivor of a former rapid transit service, a free transfer between the Canarsie Line and the Rockaway Parkway trolley (later the B42) was instituted with trolleys (later buses) entering the fare control of the Rockaway Parkway station. The free subway-streetcar (later subway-bus) transfer arrangement lasted until May 20th, 2025, and was the only such transfer that could be made without having to use a MetroCard.

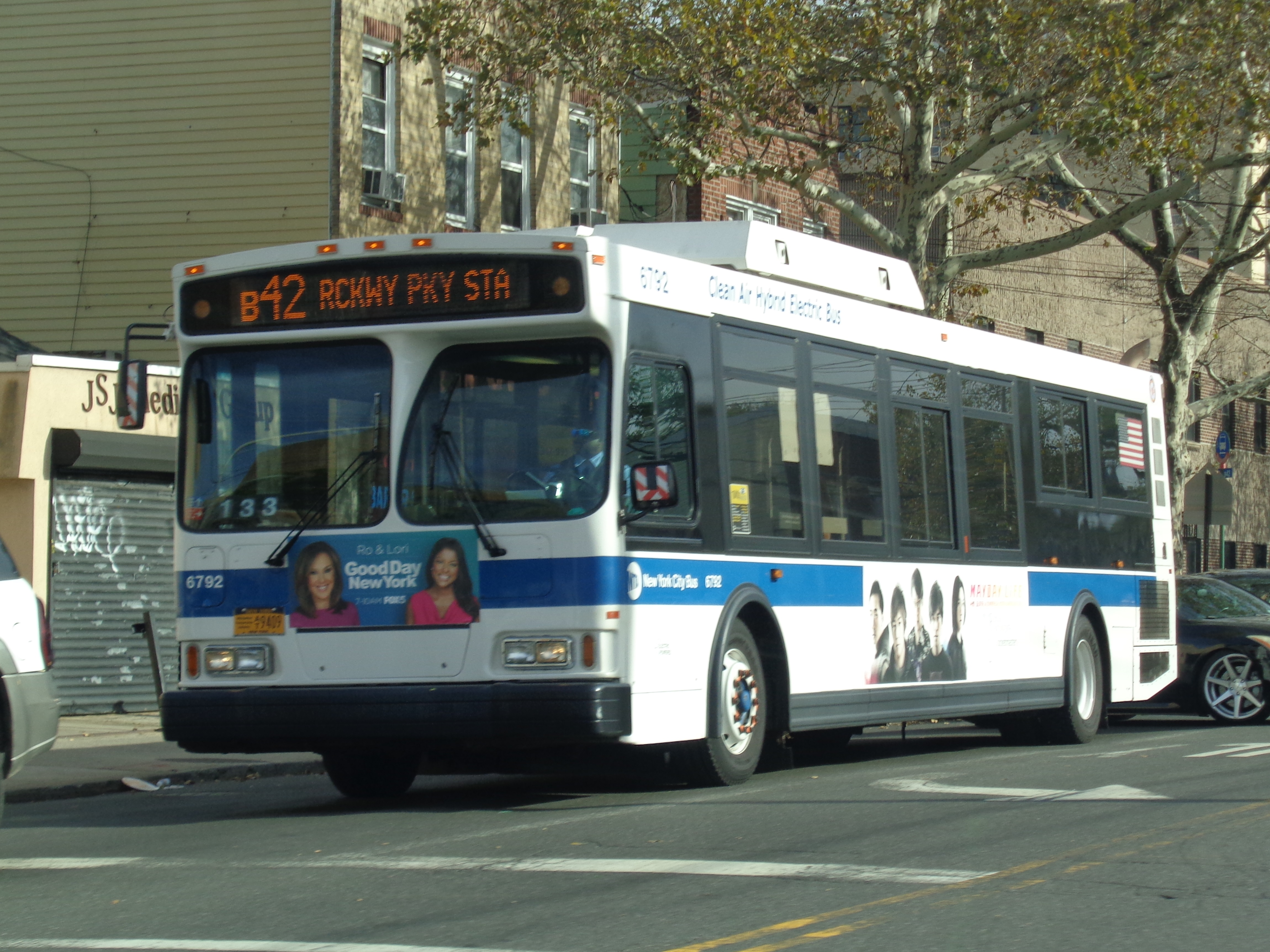
A 2006 Orion VII OG HEV (6792) on the Rockaway Parkway station-bound B42 on Flatlands Avenue between East 37th Street and Rockaway Parkway.

Buses designated B42 were substituted for streetcars on April 29, 1951.

On December 1, 2022, the MTA released a draft redesign of the Brooklyn bus network. As part of the redesign, the B42 would retain its route, but closely spaced stops would be eliminated. The B42 would be supplemented by the existing B60 route and the new B76 route, which would also run along Rockaway Parkway and Rockaway Avenue.

== Connecting bus routes ==
- B6, B60, B82, B82 SBS (at Glenwood Road)
- B103, BM2 (at Avenue M)
- B17 (at Seaview Avenue)
