= High School for Medical Professions =

Public school in New York City

Coordinates: 40°38′25.94″N 73°53′54.82″W

The High School for Medical Professions is a public high school located in the Brooklyn neighborhood of Canarsie in New York City. It teaches grades 9 through 12, and enrolls students throughout the New York City school system.

This high school opened in the buildings of the former Canarsie High School, which was closed due to poor performance and graduated its last class in 2011. The school will share its facilities with the Urban Action Academy and the High School for Innovation in Advertising and Media. The school is set to focus on training its students for a pre-medical and pre-health sciences curriculum, including the nursing and pharmacy fields. Students will be required to complete 50 hours of community service in nursing homes, hospitals, rehabilitation centers, and medical offices. The school has partnerships with the Bristol Meyers Squibb and Duane Reade pharmaceutical firms.
