= Canarsie High School =

Public school in New York City

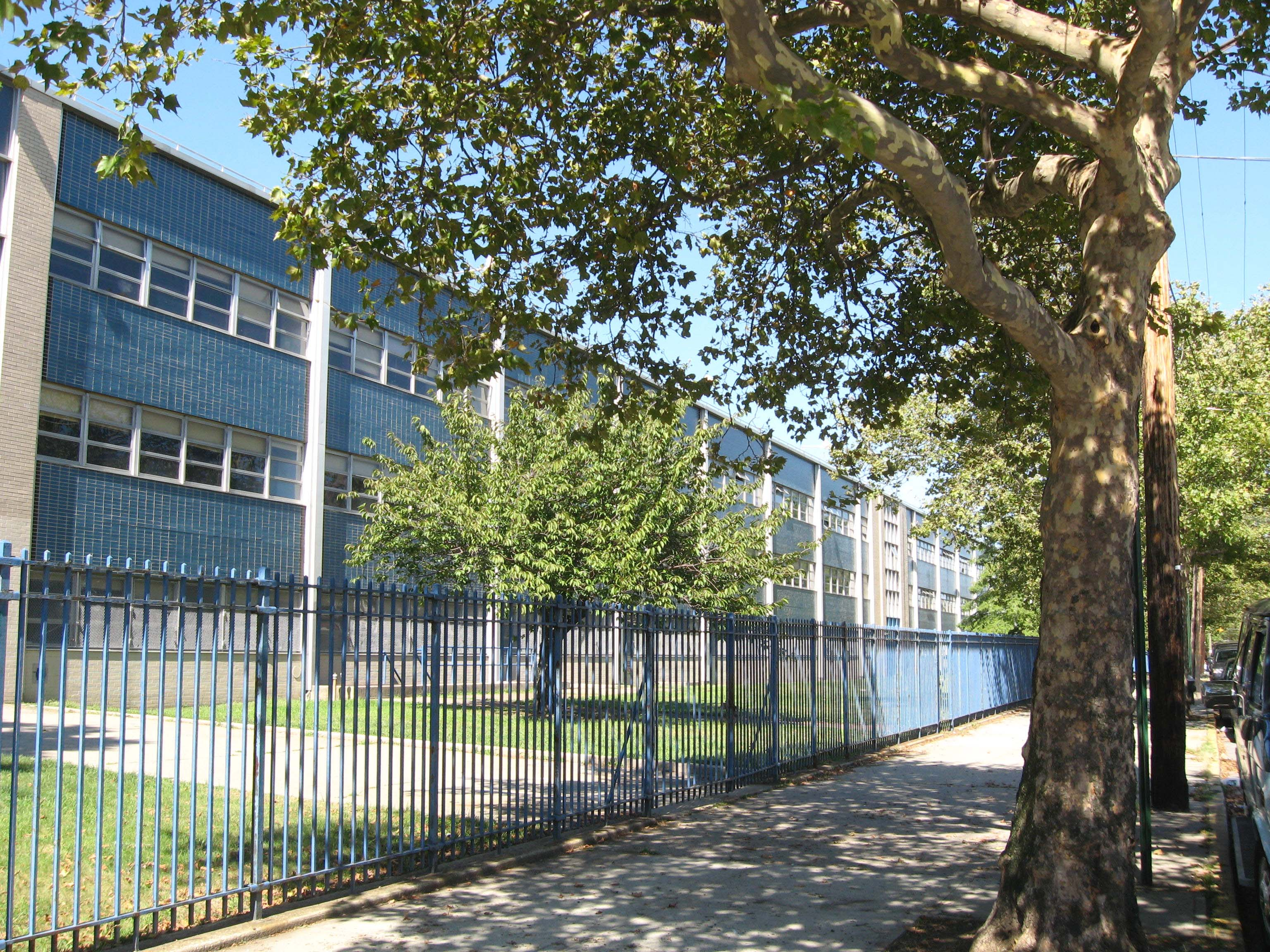

Location
- 1600 Rockaway Parkway; Brooklyn, New York; 11236; United States; 40°38′26″N 73°53′53″W

Information
- Type: Public
- Established: 1964
- Closed: 2011 (reopened as Canarsie Educational Campus)
- School district: New York City Geographic District #18
- Principal: Angelo Marrah
- Grades: 9 to 12
- Enrollment: 2,885 (2007–08)
- Colors: Blue,Black,White
- Sports: Baseball,Basketball,Football,Soccer
- Team name: The Chiefs

Canarsie High School was a public high school in the Brooklyn neighborhood of Canarsie in New York City. It first opened in 1964 but closed in 2011. The building currently operates as Canarsie Educational Campus, housing several smaller high schools.

== Closing ==
Under the Impact Schools initiative in 2004, Canarsie High School received increased police and security presence. In 2007, it was announced Canarsie would close because it "was in such disarray that the only way to fix it would be to shut it down, replacing it with several smaller schools on the same campus. The school had received the lowest possible grades (F and U) under the Department of Education's first citywide progress reports. This was part of a trend in the city beginning in the 1990s and embraced by the administration of then-Mayor Michael Bloomberg to convert failing large high schools into educational campuses. For the 2007-2008 academic year, the school stopped admitting new students. Canarsie High School graduated 40 percent of its final class of 358 students in the Spring of 2011.

== Student demographics ==
84.51% Black or African American, 11.47% Hispanic or Latino, 2.07% White non-Hispanic, 1.66% Asian and 0.28% Native American. The student/teacher ratio is 22.0. The school is part of School District #18.

== Current schools ==
Three schools, High School for Innovation in Advertising and Media, High School for Medical Professions, and Urban Action Academy, are currently operating in the Canarsie campus.

== Notable alumni ==
- Ill Bill, Hip-Hop artist from Canarsie
- Warren Cuccurullo, pop and rock guitarist
- Mark "Prince Markie Dee" Morales, rapper (The Fat Boys and solo), producer, songwriter, radio personality, actor
- Alan Edelman, mathematician, computer scientist, co-creator of the Julia programming language
- World B. Free, NBA basketball player
- Lotti Golden singer-songwriter, writer/producer, musician, guitarist
- Geoff Huston-NBA player
- Karl Kani, fashion designer
- Randy Katz, computer scientist
- Dan Morogiello, major league baseball player
- Arlie Petters, mathematical physicist
- John "Spider" Salley, NBA basketball player and talk show host
- Lance Schulters NFL player
- Howard Schultz, Chairman and CEO of Starbucks Corporation and a former owner of the Seattle SuperSonics.
- Evan Seinfield, actor, singer
- Curtis Sliwa, Guardian Angels founder and radio talk show host, 2021 mayoral candidate for New York City
- Stuart Sternberg, owner of the Tampa Bay Rays
- Clarence Taylor
- Taxstone, podcast host and Twitter personality
- Leon Williams, NFL player
