= Booth and Flinn =

American contracting company

Booth and Flinn (1876–1950) was one of the largest American general contracting companies of its era. It was established during the nineteenth century and was headquartered in Pittsburgh, Pennsylvania, United States.

== History ==
Founded by William Flinn (1851–1924) as a sole proprietorship in 1876, Booth and Flinn merged with a similar venture in 1881 that was directed by James J. Booth. The business later operated under the name of Booth and Flinn, Ltd. and finally as ooth and Flinn Company.

The firm's origins were entwined with the Republican Party machine of the political bosses Flinn and Christopher Magee (1848–1901), his partner in politics, that controlled the city of Pittsburgh for the final twenty years of the 19th century. As a result of politics and a "lowest responsible bidder" scheme, Booth and Flinn won most large construction and paving contracts in Pittsburgh and Western Pennsylvania, where they built streets, trolley lines, and bridges, usually amid charges by competitors of graft.

The firm built the Liberty Tunnels, Wabash Tunnel, Mt. Washington Transit Tunnel and Armstrong Tunnel in Pittsburgh. The firm also built the Henley Street Bridge in Knoxville, Tennessee. Booth retired from the firm in 1898; George H. Flinn, son of the founder, succeeded him, and in 1924 two other sons, William and A. Rex Flinn joined the company.

The company was purchased by a New York City construction firm in 1951 and closed.
