= List of babies born in the New York City Subway =

A number of babies have been born on New York City Subway trains and stations since it began operating in 1904. Some of the mothers were homeless women, while others were on the way to the hospital.

== Babies ==
Date	Mother	Age	Baby's sex	Description	Station/Train
February 12, 2025	Jenny Saint Pierre	25	Girl	She was from Florida, gave birth on a southbound W train. Her family had reported her missing in September 2024. After the train stopped at the 34th Street–Herald Square station, Pierre and her baby were taken to Bellevue Hospital.	W train near 34th Street–Herald Square
June 27, 2012	Wanda Dueno	24	Boy	She was on her way home when she gave birth in the final car of a J train, before it pulled into the Chambers Street station.	J train near Brooklyn Bridge–City Hall/Chambers Street
January 11, 1993	Vida Boateng	21	Girl	She was on the way to her obstetrician's office, when she began contractions on a southbound 3 train and gave birth at the Wall Street station.	Wall Street
March 21, 1989	Martha Davis	26	Girl	She gave birth in the Rockefeller Center station, assisted by police officers. The baby was reported to be 4 pounds and 9 ounces. Davis was homeless; her and her baby were taken to Roosevelt Hospital.	47th–50th Streets–Rockefeller Center
August 5, 1977	Beverly Macias	24	Girl	She gave birth on a northbound 1, 2 or 3 train that was stopped at the Chambers Street station. The baby and her mother were taken to St. Vincent's Hospital.	1, 2 or 3 train at Chambers Street
January 26, 1974	Odessa Goddard	40	Boy	She gave birth on an F train as it pulled into the York Street station. She had been homeless for seven months, living in parks and subway stations. Goddard and her son were taken to Cumberland Hospital.	F train in York Street
October 23, 1964	James Marston	29	Boy	She gave birth on an L train. She was already in labor before she got on the subway; she was trying to get to Greenpoint Hospital. The baby was born near Halsey Street station, but a conductor was only informed at the Montrose Avenue station, where it waited. The MTA told the conductor to continue nonstop to the Bedford Avenue station, where an ambulance took the mother and child to Greenpoint Hospital. They were later transferred to Elmhurst Hospital, which had more available beds.	L train near Halsey Street
July 9, 1937	Catherine O'Brien	27	Boy	She gave birth at the Avenue U station (BMT Brighton Line). O'Brien was employed as a domestic. The two were taken to the Coney Island Hospital.	Avenue U
February 6, 1933	Gertrude Rudolf		Boy	She gave birth on a northbound express 2. An ambulance met the mother and son at the 177th Street station.	2 train near 177th Street
