= Bushwick Avenue–Aberdeen Street station =

New York City Subway station in Brooklyn

Bushwick Avenue– Aberdeen Street
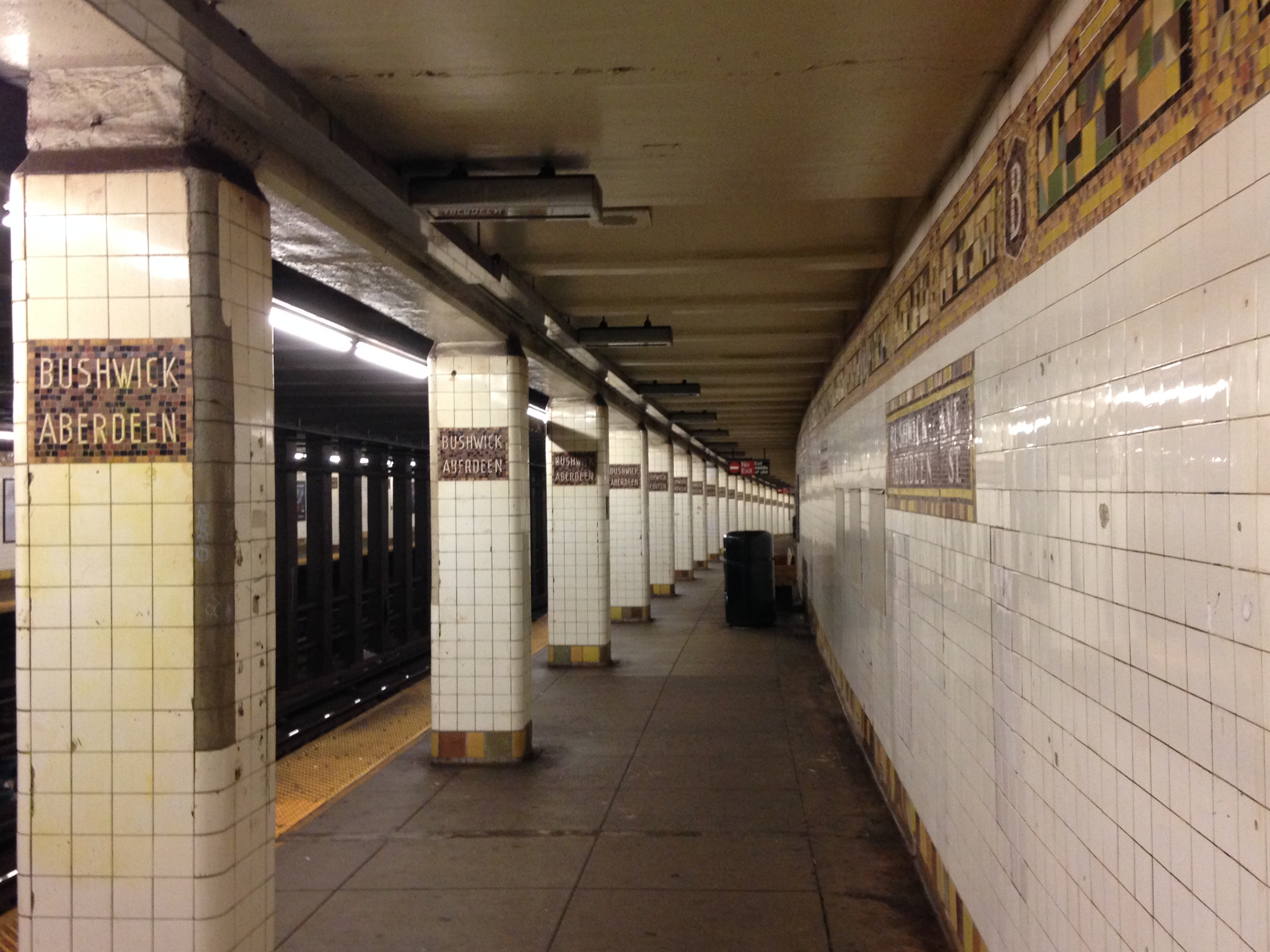
- Station ID mosaics on the pillars and walls

Station statistics
- Address: Bushwick Avenue & Aberdeen Street; Brooklyn, New York
- Borough: Brooklyn
- Locale: Bushwick
- Coordinates: 40.682851°N 73.905158°W
- Division: B (BMT)
- Line: BMT Canarsie Line
- Services: L (all times)
- Structure: Underground
- Platforms: 2 side platforms
- Tracks: 2

Other information
- Opened: July 14, 1928; 98 years ago

Traffic
- 2025: 603,706 ▲5.1%
- Rank: 370 out of 423
Services
| Preceding station | New York City Subway | Following station |
|---|---|---|
| Wilson Avenue toward Eighth Avenue | L (New York City Subway service) | Broadway Junction toward Canarsie–Rockaway Parkway |
Location
Location within New York City Subway
Location within New York City
Location within New York
Street map
Station service legend
| Symbol | Description |
| Stops all times | Stops all times |

The Bushwick Avenue–Aberdeen Street station is a station on the BMT Canarsie Line of the New York City Subway. Located in Bushwick, Brooklyn, it is served by the L train at all times.

== History ==
Bushwick Avenue–Aberdeen Street, opened on July 14, 1928, as part of an extension of the Canarsie Line. This extension connected Montrose Avenue, which had opened four years earlier, to Broadway Junction, which was the western end of the already-operating elevated line to Canarsie.

== Station layout ==
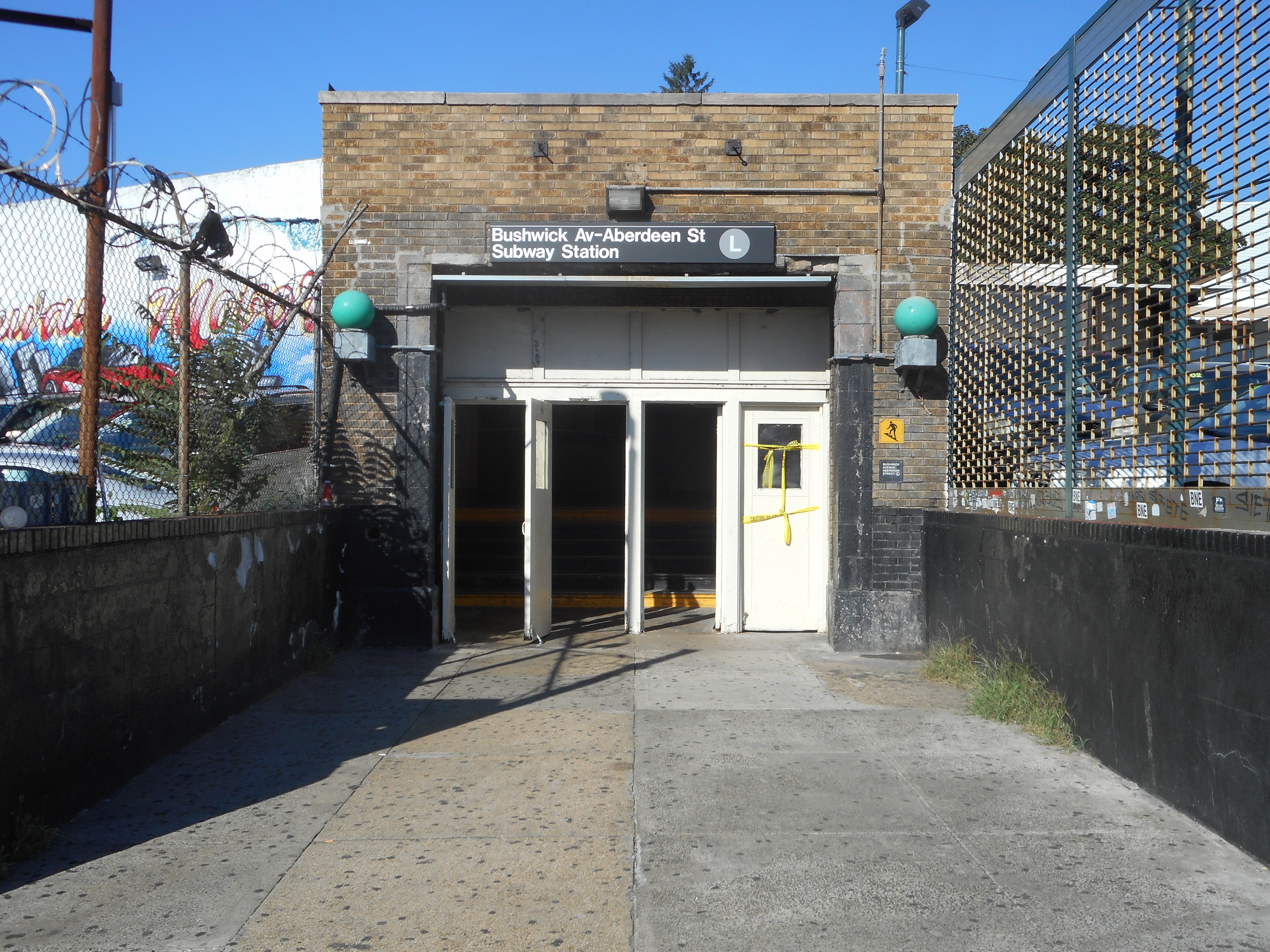
The street entrance to Bushwick Avenue–Aberdeen Street station.

This station has two tracks and two side platforms. The side platforms are slightly curved and the two tracks are at different levels at the north end of the station, with the southbound tracks being higher due to their descent from an elevated stretch at Wilson Avenue. Fixed platform barriers, which are intended to prevent commuters falling to the tracks, are positioned near the platform edges.

Parchment brown replacement tiles can be observed. The pillars are covered in white tile, with mosaics on each one bearing the station's name, "Bushwick Aberdeen". The elaborate porcelain mosaic band is predominantly tan, peach, mauve and brown with yellow, cream, green, rosy beige, slate blue, indigo and black grape tiles in the center. In the mezzanine, there are also bright aqua tiles, as well as the above-mentioned brown replacements.

=== Exit ===
The single entrance to this underground station is in a small building on the north side of Bushwick Avenue between Aberdeen Street and DeSales Place. In this space are 11-foot (3.4 m) high coffered ceilings, suspended light fixtures, and fancy ironwork.
