= Jefferson Street station =

New York City Subway station in Brooklyn

Jefferson Street
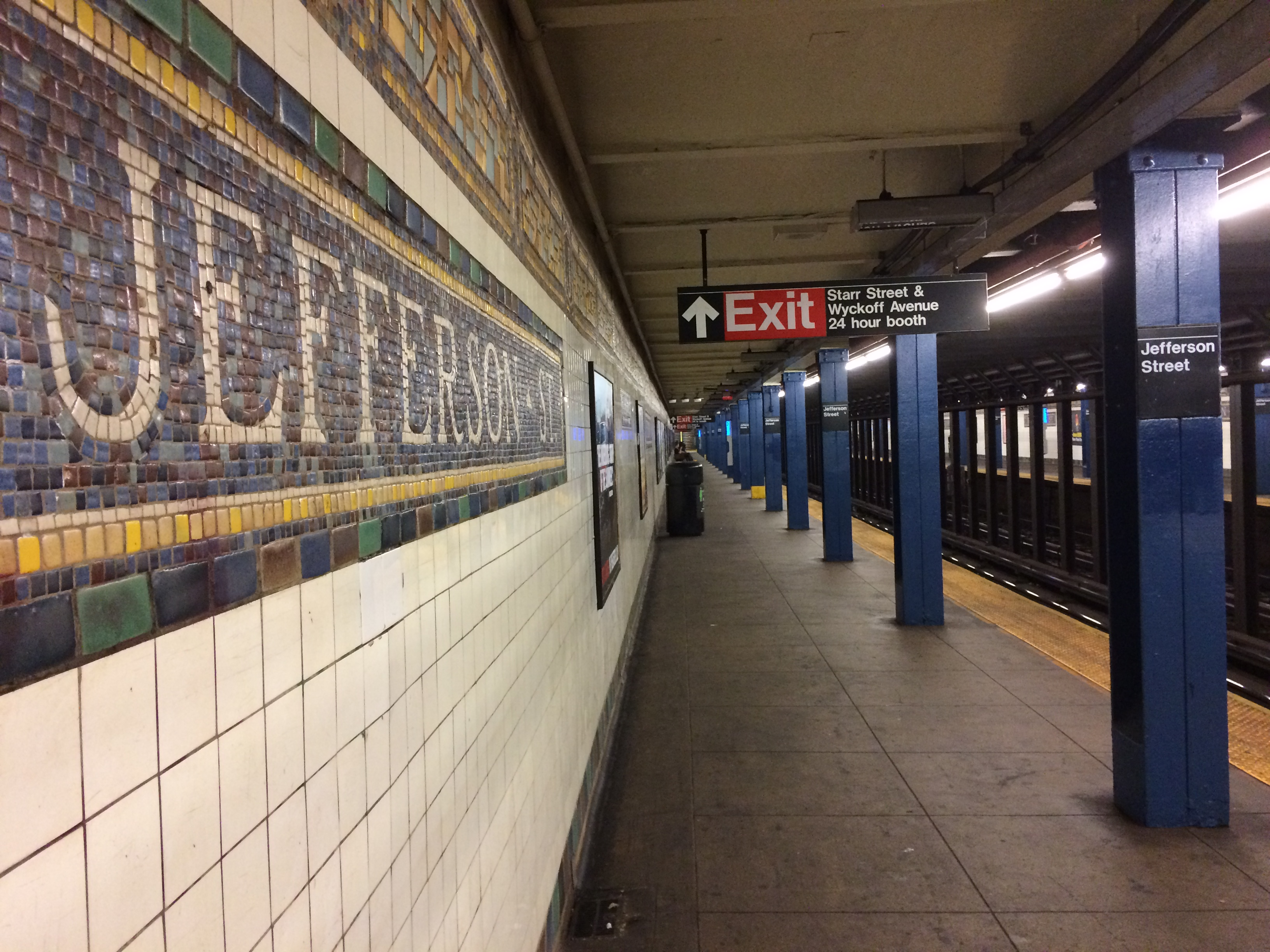
- Northbound platform

Station statistics
- Address: Jefferson Street & Wyckoff Avenue; Brooklyn, New York
- Borough: Brooklyn
- Locale: Bushwick
- Coordinates: 40.706994°N 73.923569°W
- Division: B (BMT)
- Line: BMT Canarsie Line
- Services: L (all times)
- Transit: NYCT Bus: B57
- Structure: Underground
- Platforms: 2 side platforms
- Tracks: 2

Other information
- Opened: July 14, 1928; 98 years ago
- Accessible: No; planned

Traffic
- 2025: 2,601,754 ▲15.2%
- Rank: 147 out of 423
Services
Preceding station	New York City Subway	Following station
Morgan Avenue toward Eighth Avenue	L (New York City Subway service)	DeKalb Avenue toward Canarsie–Rockaway Parkway
Location
Location within New York City Subway
Location within New York City
Location within New York
Track layout
Street map
Station service legend
Symbol	Description
Stops all times	Stops all times

The Jefferson Street station is a station on the BMT Canarsie Line of the New York City Subway. Located in Bushwick, Brooklyn at the intersection of Jefferson Street and Wyckoff Avenue, it is served by the L train at all times.

== History ==
=== Background ===
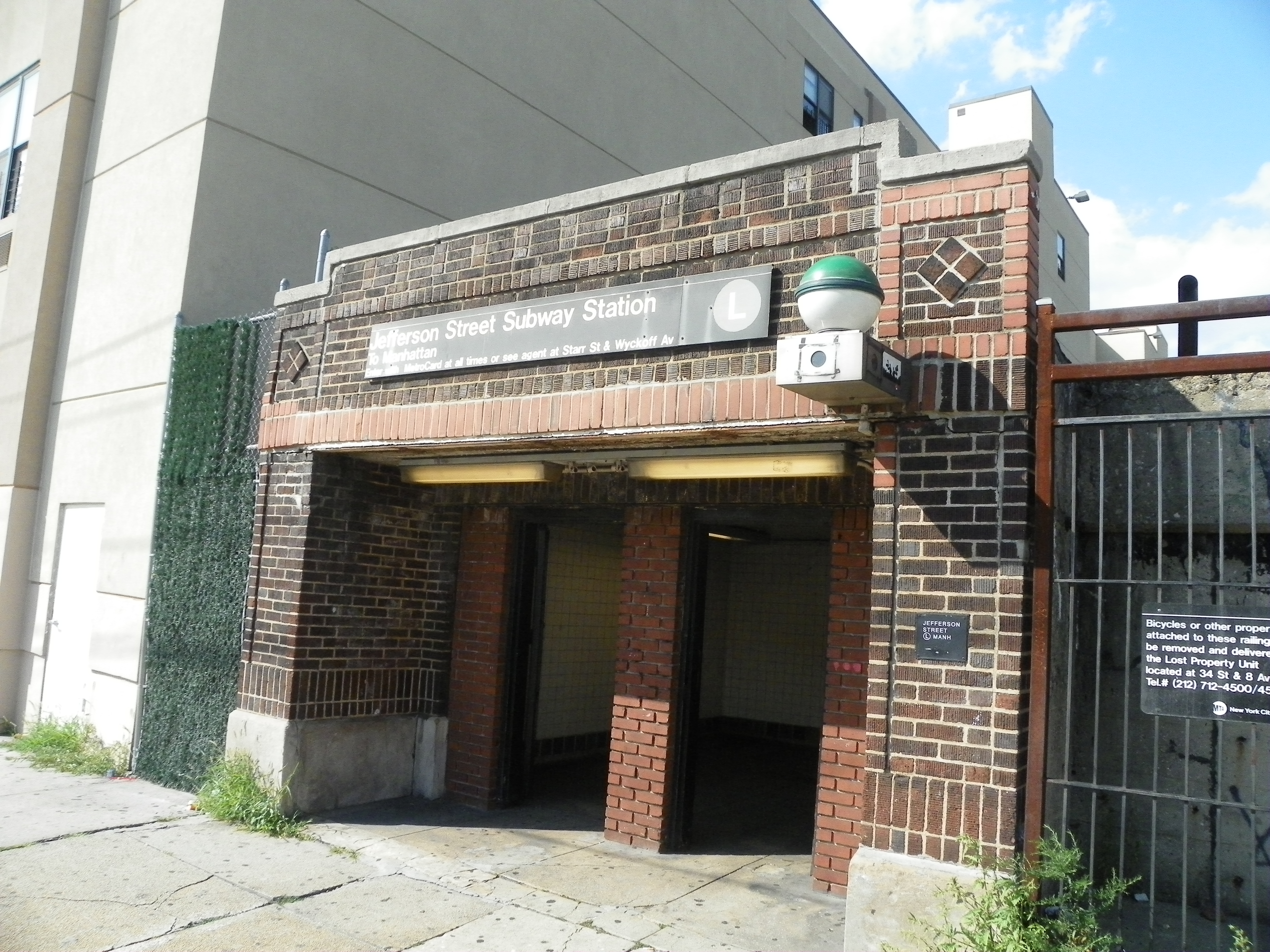
The red brick entrance to the Manhattan-bound platform at Jefferson Street

In 1913, the Dual Contracts were signed, which called for the construction of various rapid transit services throughout the City of New York. Among these was a subway line initially known as the 14th Street–Eastern District Line, usually shortened to 14th Street–Eastern Line. The line would run beneath 14th Street in Manhattan, from Sixth Avenue under the East River and through Williamsburg to Montrose and Bushwick Avenues in Brooklyn. Booth and Flinn was awarded the contract to construct the line on January 13, 1916. Clifford Milburn Holland served as the engineer-in-charge during the construction.

Due to the city's failure to approve the section of the line between Montrose Avenue and East New York, the 14th Street/Eastern Line was initially isolated from the rest of the system. In 1924, a temporary connection was built from the Long Island Rail Road (LIRR)'s Bushwick Yard that ran via Montrose Avenue and then connected to the 14th Street/Eastern Line under Bushwick Avenue just near the Montrose Avenue station. This was done to allow the delivery of BMT Standard subway cars. The first of the cars were delivered by this ramp on June 20, 1924. On June 30, 1924, the section between Sixth Avenue in Manhattan and Montrose Avenue in Brooklyn opened.

=== Construction and opening ===
For the extension of the 14th Street/Eastern Line from Montrose Avenue to East New York, the New York City Board of Estimate had initially given its consent to an elevated line over the Evergreen Branch of the LIRR. The Board of Estimate subsequently refused to allow a construction contract for the elevated line, while the BRT did not want to build an underground line. The extension was changed to an underground alignment following opposition from industries on the Evergreen Branch. In July 1924, the New York City Board of Transportation (BOT) approved a modified route for recommendation to the Board of Estimate. The route would be wholly underground and consist of three tracks. From Montrose Avenue, it would curve east under McKibbin Street, private property, and Harrison Place. Past Varick Avenue, it would turn southeast to Wyckoff Avenue, underneath which it would run to Eldert Street. This plan was to cost $8 million.

In September 1924, the BOT approved the remaining section of the route between Eldert Street and Broadway Junction in East New York. East of Eldert Street, the route would turn south to a ground-level alignment parallel to the LIRR's Bay Ridge Branch, then run southeast in a tunnel underneath private property to the intersection of Eastern Parkway and Bushwick Avenue, where it would emerge onto a ramp leading to the existing Canarsie elevated. An ornamental viaduct over Bushwick Avenue and Eastern Parkway was removed from the original plans due to opposition from property owners.

Three contracts for the construction of the extension were awarded in December at a total cost of $9,531,204. The section from Montrose Avenue to Varick Avenue was awarded to the Underpinning and Foundation Company, while the section from Varick Avenue to Bleecker Street and from Bleecker Street to Halsey Street went to the Oakdale Contracting Company.

On July 14, 1928, the line was extended further east beneath Wyckoff Avenue and then south paralleling the Bay Ridge Branch to a new station at Broadway Junction, above the existing station on the Broadway Elevated (Jamaica Line). At this time, it was connected to the already-operating elevated line to Canarsie. The Jefferson Street station opened as part of this extension.

=== Station renovation ===
In 2019, the Metropolitan Transportation Authority announced that this station would become ADA-accessible as part of the agency's 2020–2024 Capital Program. The project was to be funded by congestion pricing in New York City, but it was postponed in June 2024 after the implementation of congestion pricing was delayed. However, after congestion pricing was approved, the MTA announced that the elevator installations would proceed. In July 2026, the MTA announced plans for accessibility renovations at five subway stations in Brooklyn. The Jefferson Street station would receive two elevators.

== Station layout ==
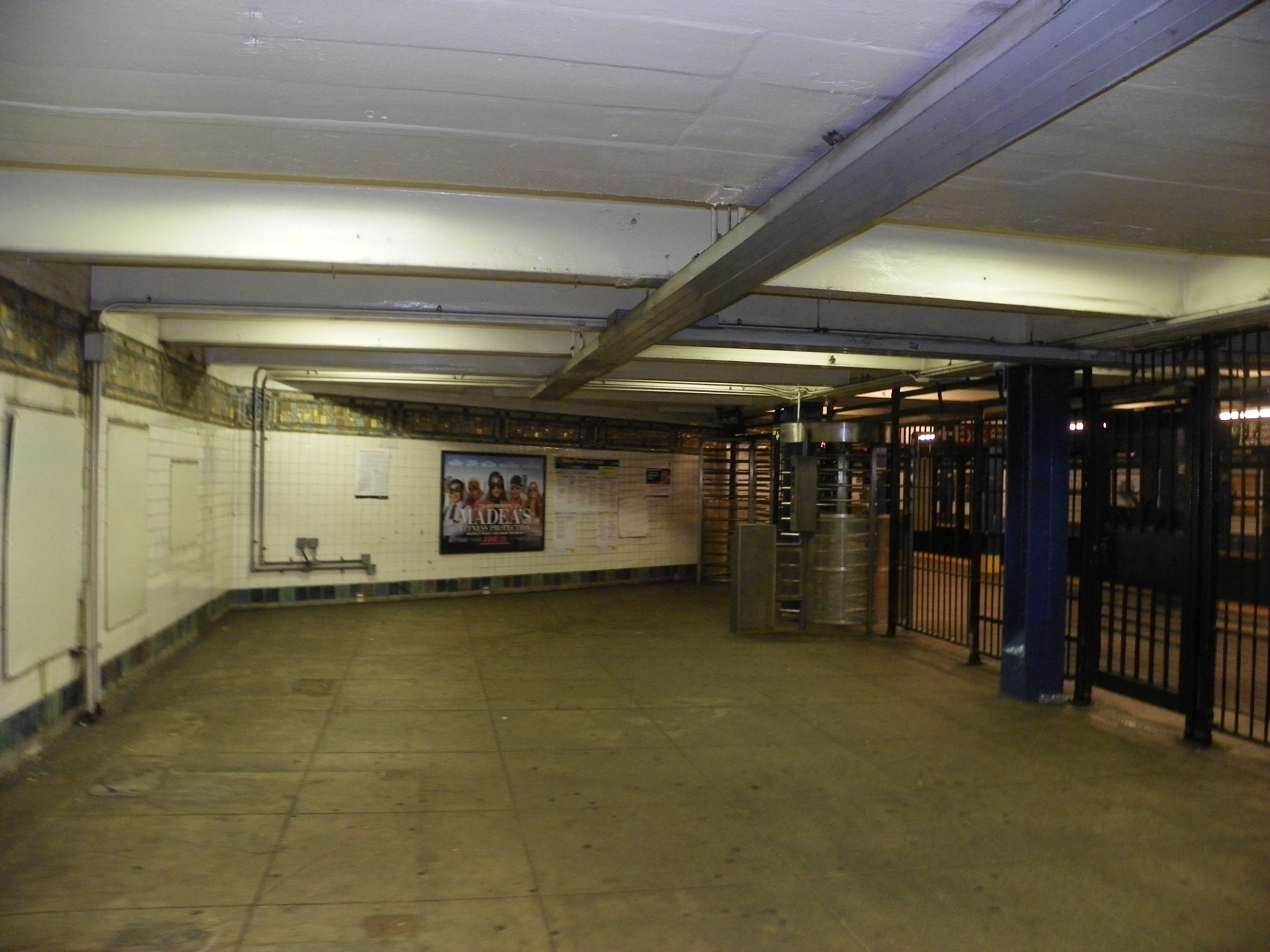
Mezzanine

This underground station has two side platforms and two tracks. The northbound platform is 535 feet (163 m) long, while the southbound platform is 537 feet (164 m) long, and both platforms are 12 feet (3.7 m) wide. Fixed platform barriers, which are intended to prevent commuters falling to the tracks, are positioned near the platform edges.

The mosaic tile bands on both platforms are predominantly blue and brown with yellow and tan accents. There is a full frieze of icons with correct details. The colors, however, shift from the earth tones found in the original design to more pastel shades of rose, slate blue, yellow and peach. Some of the background tile is mottled. This is handmade work with all of the proper elements, including randomly cut and set tiles in the center. "J" tablets on a blue background run along the trim line at regular intervals.

Blue i-beam columns run along both platforms at regular intervals with alternating ones having the standard black station name plate in white lettering. New tile was installed at the Canarsie-bound platform in the summer of 2000.

=== Exits ===
This station's full-time fare control area is at the extreme east (railroad south) end. A double-width staircase from each platform goes up to a waiting area/crossover, where a turnstile provides entrance/exit from the station. Outside fare control, there is a token booth and four staircases going up to all corners of Starr Street and Wyckoff Avenue.

Both platforms have a same-level, unstaffed fare control area at the opposite end. One exit-only turnstile and one High Entry/Exit Turnstile lead to an enclosed staircase going up to a small brick building on either western corners of Jefferson Street and Wyckoff Avenue. The Manhattan-bound building is on the northwest corner while the Canarsie-bound building is on the southwest one.
