= Wilson Avenue station =

New York City Subway station in Brooklyn

Wilson Avenue
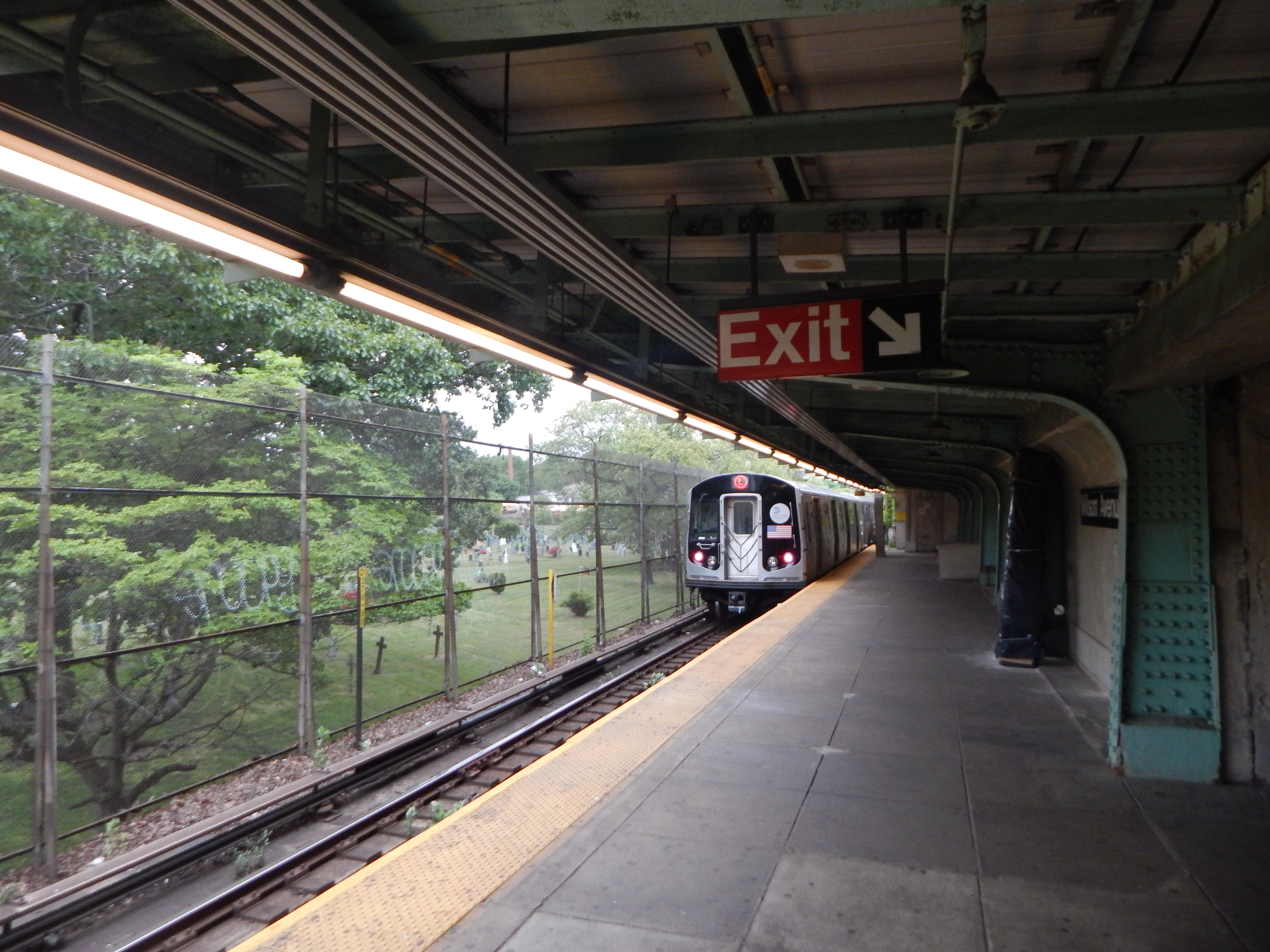
- R143 L train departing the southbound platform

Station statistics
- Address: Wilson Avenue & Moffat Street; Brooklyn, New York
- Borough: Brooklyn
- Locale: Bushwick
- Coordinates: 40.6885°N 73.9044°W
- Division: B (BMT)
- Line: BMT Canarsie Line
- Services: L (all times)
- Transit: NYCT Bus: B60
- Structure: Elevated (southbound) covered at-grade (northbound)
- Levels: 2
- Platforms: 2 split side platforms (1 on each level)
- Tracks: 2 (1 on each level)

Other information
- Opened: July 14, 1928; 98 years ago
- Accessible: Partially; full access planned (northbound only, southbound planned)

Traffic
- 2025: 1,155,340 ▲18.3%
- Rank: 285 out of 423
Services
Preceding station	New York City Subway	Following station
Halsey Street toward Eighth Avenue	L (New York City Subway service)	Bushwick Avenue–Aberdeen Street toward Canarsie–Rockaway Parkway
Location
Location within New York City Subway
Location within New York City
Location within New York
Track layout
Upper level
Lower level
Street map
Station service legend
Symbol	Description
Stops all times	Stops all times
- Wilson Avenue Subway Station (Dual System BMT)
- U.S. National Register of Historic Places
- MPS: New York City Subway System MPS
- NRHP reference No.: 05000681
- Added to NRHP: July 6, 2005

The Wilson Avenue station is a station on the BMT Canarsie Line of the New York City Subway. Located at the intersection of Wilson Avenue and Moffat Street in Brooklyn, it is served by the L train at all times.

== History ==
Wilson Avenue opened on July 14, 1928, as part of an extension of the Canarsie Line. This extension, done as part of the Dual Contracts, connected Montrose Avenue, which had opened four years earlier, to Broadway Junction, which was the western end of the already-operating elevated line to Canarsie. The station opened next to the Most Holy Trinity Cemetery, making the eastbound platform overlook the pre-existing cemetery.

On September 21, 1984, Irma Lozada, a New York City Transit Police officer, was murdered at an abandoned lot south of the station. Lozada was part of the Plain Clothes Anti-Crime unit when she was gunned down by Darryl Jeter, a chain snatcher that took her service gun as she attempted to arrest him for stealing a necklace from a rider. Lozada was the first female police officer to be killed in action in New York City.

In the 2010s, a ramp was built from the Wilson Avenue entrance to the ground-level Manhattan-bound platform for $3–5 million, making it accessible under the Americans with Disabilities Act of 1990 (ADA). At the time, the elevated Canarsie-bound platform was not proposed to get ADA access since it would be much more costly to add an elevator up to the Canarsie-bound level. As part of its 2025–2029 Capital Program, the MTA has proposed making the station wheelchair-accessible for the southbound platform as well, in compliance with the ADA.

Plans for the Interborough Express, a light rail line using the Bay Ridge Branch right of way, were announced in 2023. As part of the project, a light rail station at Wilson Avenue has been proposed next to the existing subway station.

== Station layout ==
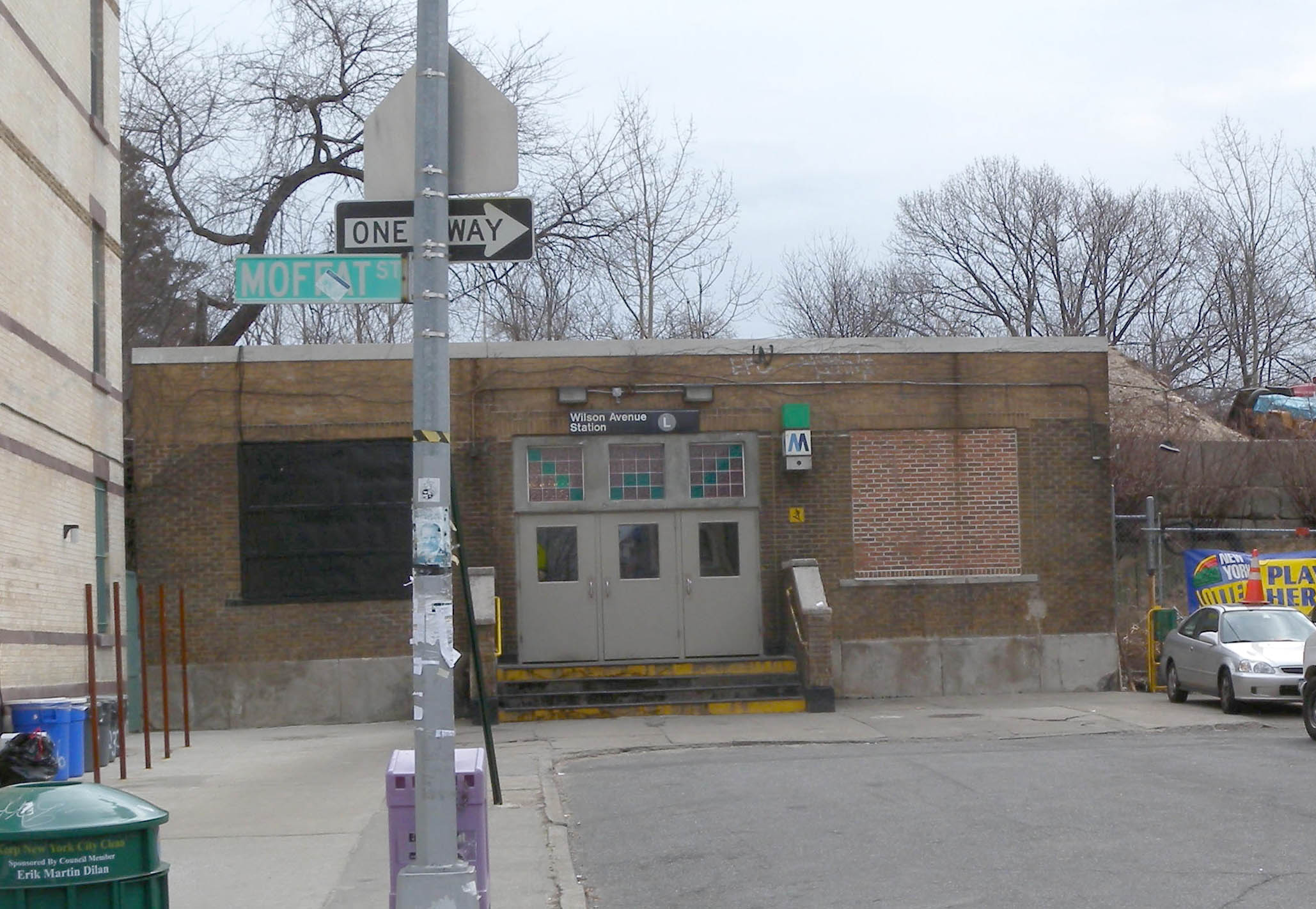
Street entrance prior to accessible ramp implementation and staircase raised by one step.

The station, which was designed by Robert Ridgway and Squire J. Vickers, has some features that are not found elsewhere in the system. It is squeezed in between the Most Holy Trinity Cemetery, to the east, and the Long Island Rail Road's (LIRR) Bay Ridge Branch, to the west. The two tracks and two side platforms are on different levels, making Wilson Avenue the only station on the Canarsie Line where this occurs. Since the platforms are on different levels, each has a different design. The outbound track sits on a low elevated structure; immediately south of the station, the outbound track passes over Central Avenue before descending into a tunnel toward Bushwick Avenue–Aberdeen Street. The inbound track is immediately below the outbound track, and this portion of the station gives the impression of being underground, but it is really at street level. Fixed platform barriers, which are intended to prevent commuters falling to the tracks, are positioned near the platform edges.

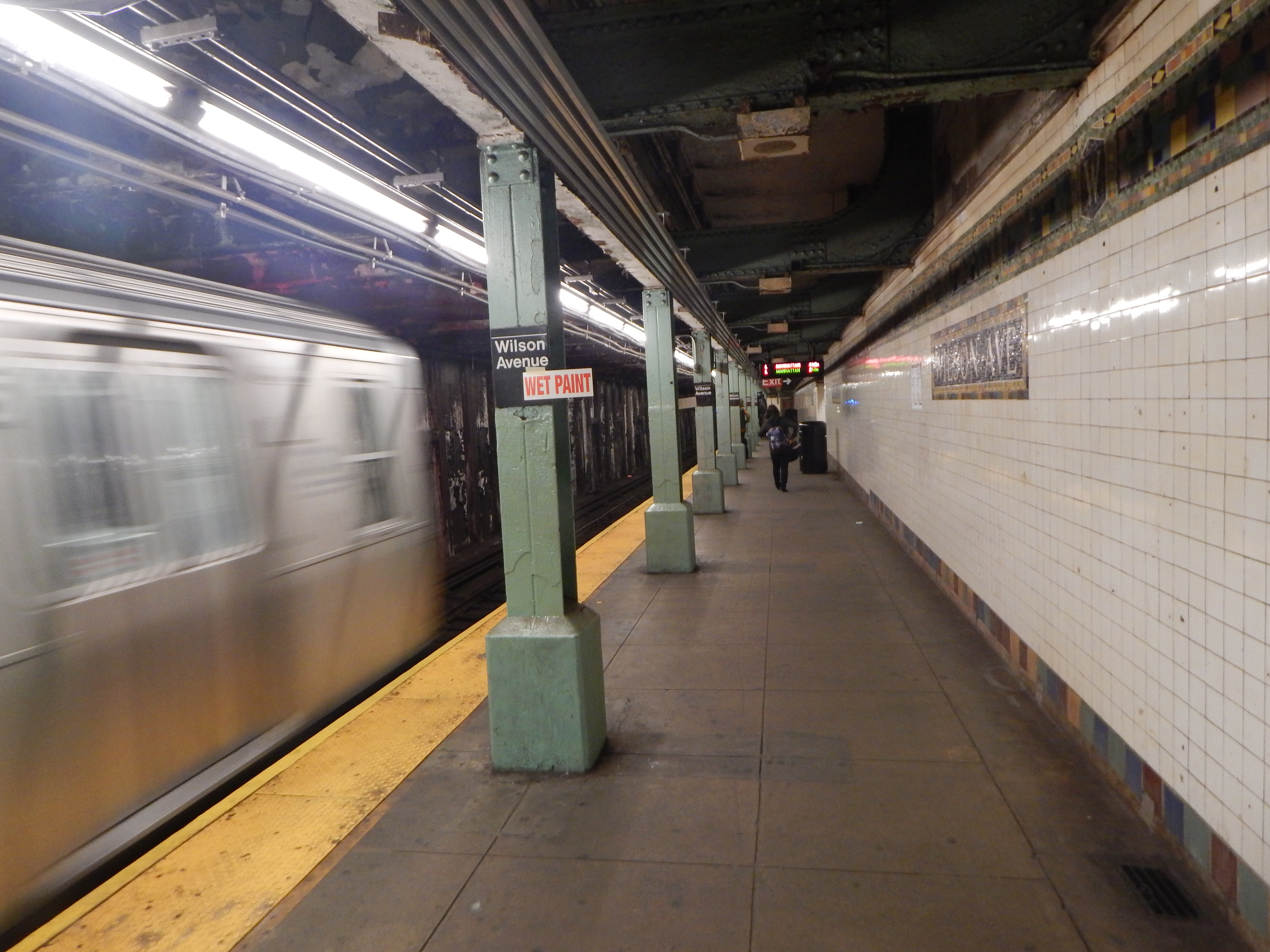
The westbound platform

The Rockaway Parkway-bound (upper level) platform has a canopy along the entire length of the platform, supported by a beige concrete retaining wall with curved green supports extending from the wall at regular intervals. A fence runs along the track side of the southbound platform, separating the subway station from the Most Holy Trinity Cemetery, which is visible directly through the fence. The Manhattan-bound (lower level) platform has tiling and name plaques, which is typical for a Canarsie Line underground station. A concrete wall closes off the east side of the lower level. The mosaic band is predominantly green at edges with a vivid multicolored design throughout, 28 colors in all. The trackside wall once had tiles that matched those of the platform, but these tiles were removed sometime after 1982, and the trackside wall is currently the same plain, dark color as a typical New York City Subway tunnel wall.

=== Exit ===
There is one entrance and exit to the station, which is in a dead-end at the foot of Wilson Avenue, just east of Moffat Street. There are five steps leading up to the station entrance, as well as a accessible ramp. The entrance feeds directly onto the northbound platform with stairs to southbound service on the upper level.

== See also ==
- National Register of Historic Places listings in Brooklyn
