= Graham Avenue station =

New York City Subway station in Brooklyn

Graham Avenue
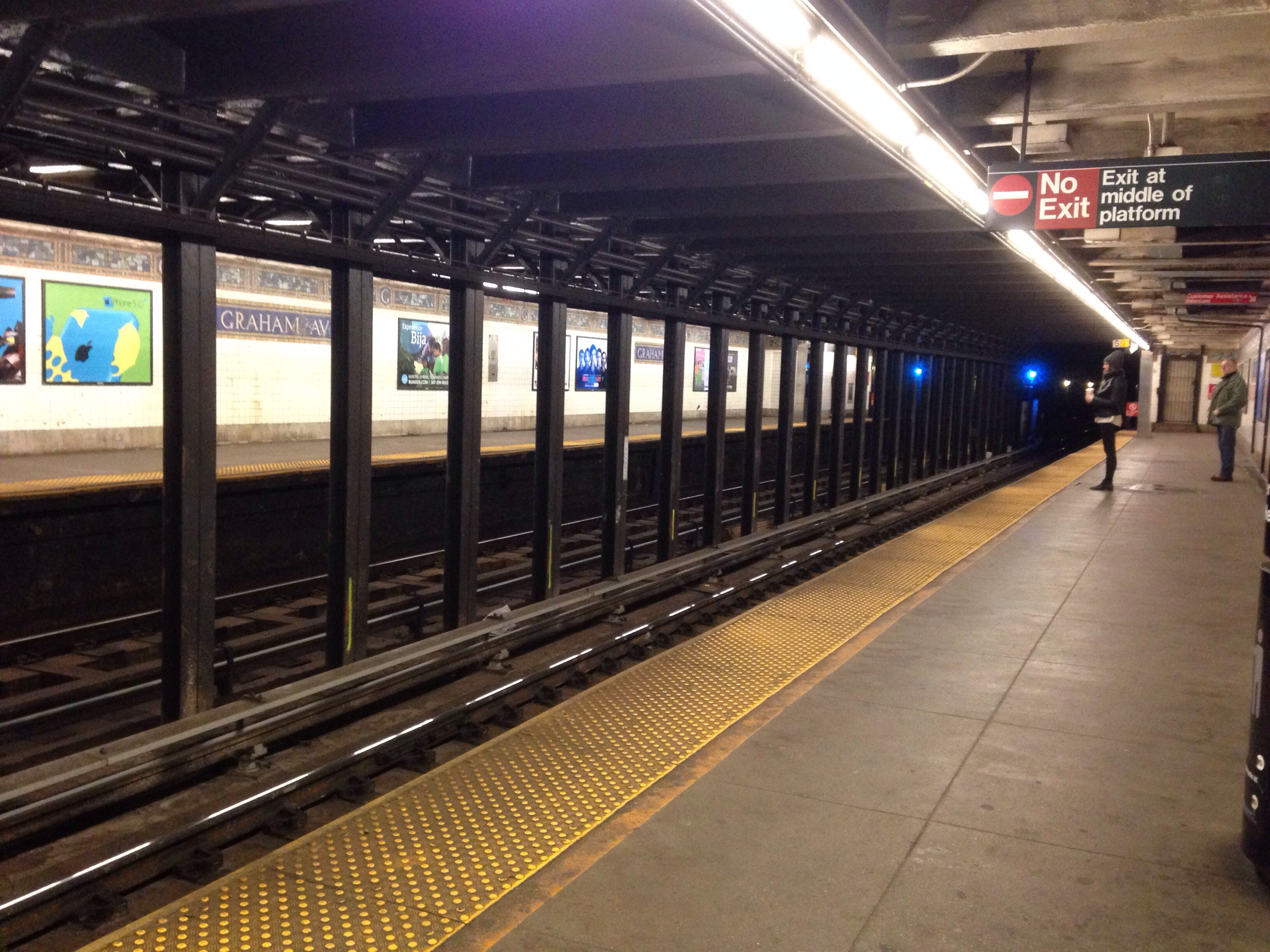

Station statistics
- Address: Graham Avenue & Metropolitan Avenue; Brooklyn, New York
- Borough: Brooklyn
- Locale: Williamsburg
- Coordinates: 40.714509°N 73.944426°W
- Division: B (BMT)
- Line: BMT Canarsie Line
- Services: L (all times)
- Transit: NYCT Bus: B24, B43
- Structure: Underground
- Platforms: 2 side platforms
- Tracks: 2

Other information
- Opened: June 30, 1924; 102 years ago

Traffic
- 2025: 2,462,743 ▲9.1%
- Rank: 151 out of 423
Services
Preceding station	New York City Subway	Following station
Lorimer Street toward Eighth Avenue	L (New York City Subway service)	Grand Street toward Canarsie–Rockaway Parkway
Location
Location within New York City Subway
Location within New York City
Location within New York
Track layout
Street map
Station service legend
Symbol	Description
Stops all times	Stops all times

The Graham Avenue station is a station on the BMT Canarsie Line of the New York City Subway. Located at the intersection of Graham and Metropolitan Avenues in Williamsburg, Brooklyn, it is served by the L train at all times.

== History ==
This station opened on June 30, 1924 as part of the initial segment of the Canarsie Line, which was a product of the Dual Contracts, stretching from Sixth Avenue to Montrose Avenue.

== Station layout ==
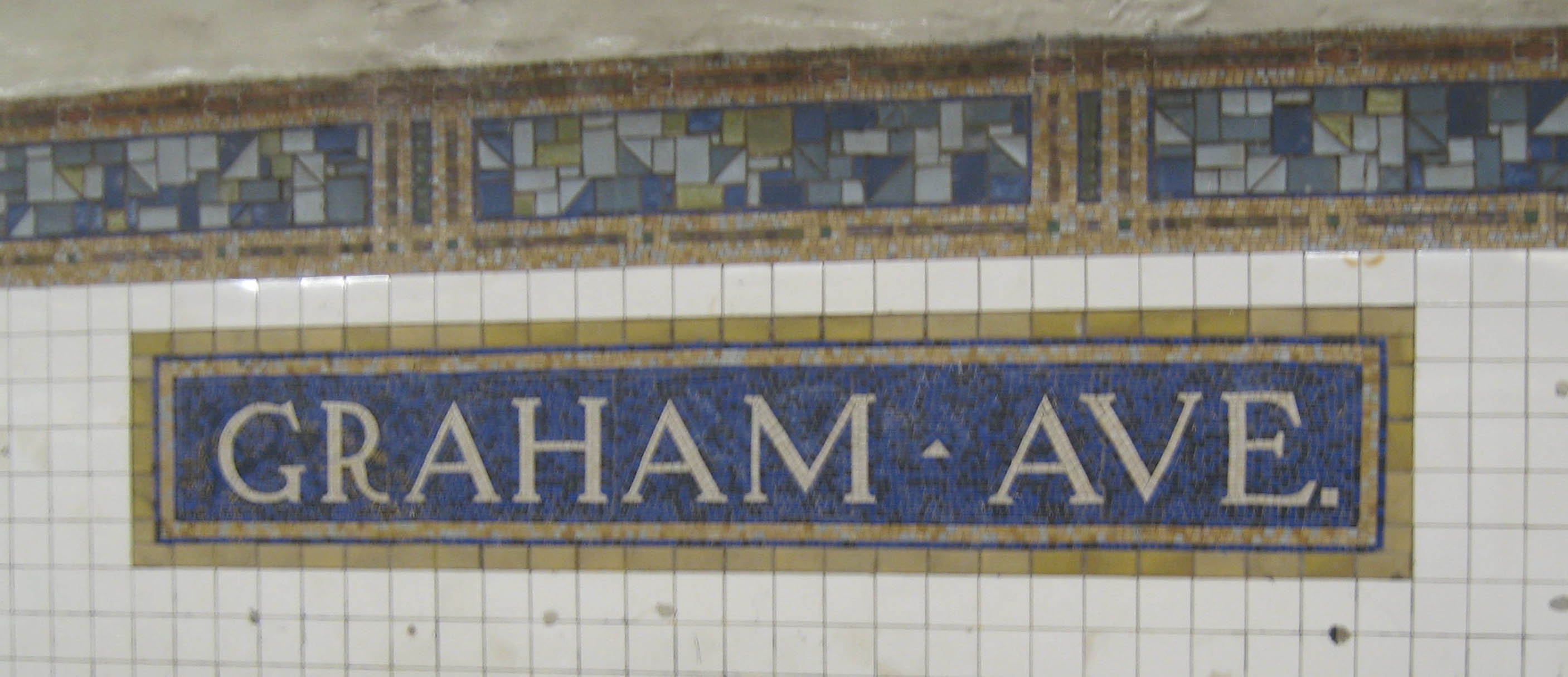
Station name tablet on the southbound platform

This underground station has two tracks and two side platforms. Fixed platform barriers, which are intended to prevent commuters falling to the tracks, are positioned near the platform edges. Both platforms have their original mosaic tile band showing various shades of green and blue with peach and yellow borders. "G" tablets on a dark blue background run at regular intervals. The mosaic name tablets read "GRAHAM AVE." in gold serif lettering on a blue background and gold border. There are no columns on either platform.

=== Exits ===
Each platform has one same-level fare control area towards the west end (railroad north). Each one has a turnstile bank and two street stairs. The ones on the Manhattan-bound side go up to either northern corners of Graham and Metropolitan Avenues, while the ones on the Canarsie-bound side go up to either southern corners. The Manhattan-bound fare control area has a full-time sales booth, while the booth on the Canarsie-bound one is for informational use only. There are no crossovers or crossunders.
