= DeKalb Avenue station (BMT Canarsie Line) =

New York City Subway station in Brooklyn

DeKalb Avenue
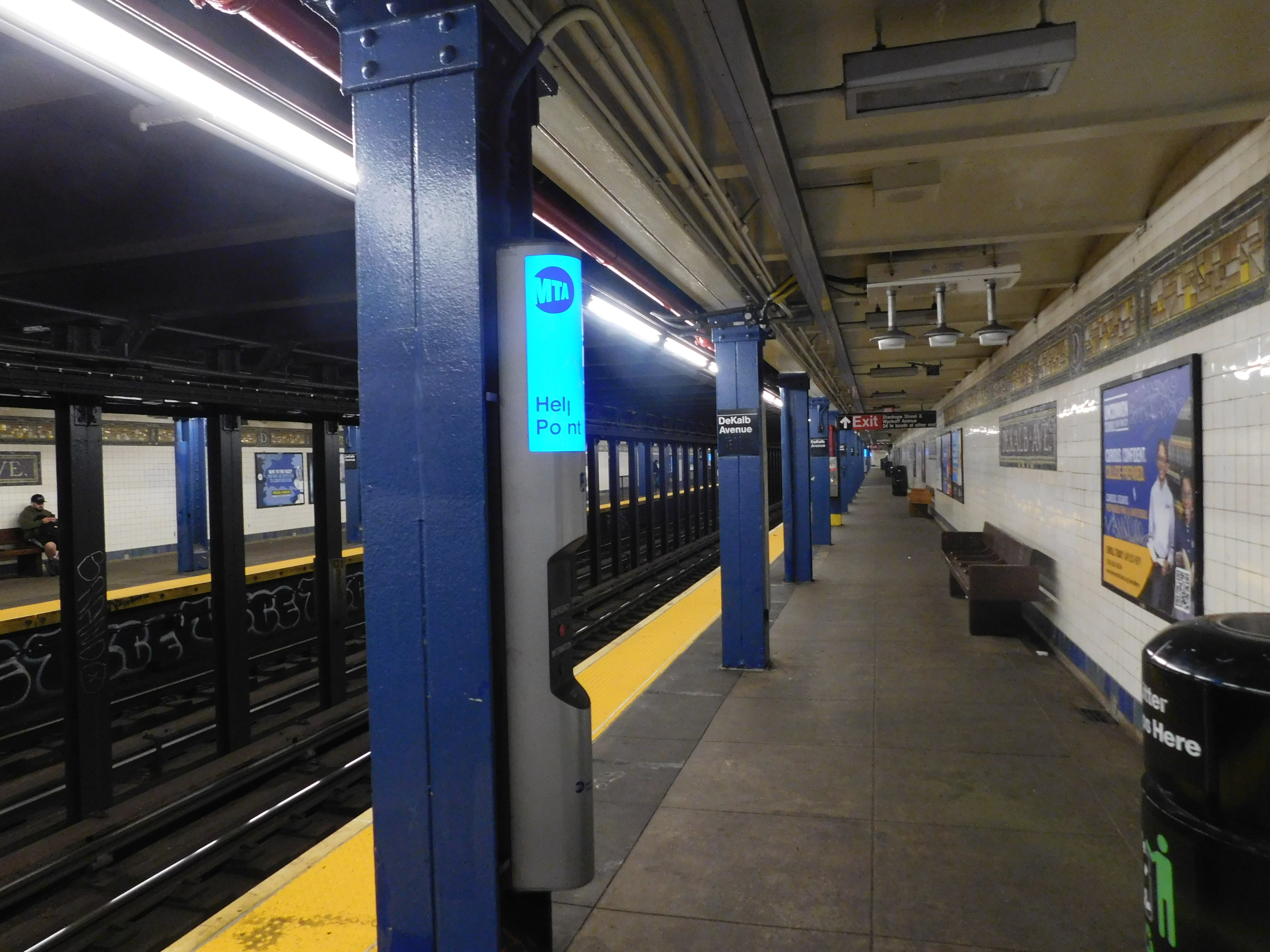
- Southbound platform

Station statistics
- Address: DeKalb Avenue & Wyckoff Avenue; Brooklyn, New York
- Borough: Brooklyn
- Locale: Bushwick
- Coordinates: 40.704294°N 73.919277°W
- Division: B (BMT)
- Line: BMT Canarsie Line
- Services: L (all times)
- Transit: NYCT Bus: B13, B38
- Structure: Underground
- Platforms: 2 side platforms
- Tracks: 2

Other information
- Opened: July 14, 1928; 98 years ago

Traffic
- 2025: 3,245,781 ▲11.3%
- Rank: 117 out of 423
Services
Preceding station	New York City Subway	Following station
Jefferson Street toward Eighth Avenue	L (New York City Subway service)	Myrtle–Wyckoff Avenues toward Canarsie–Rockaway Parkway
Location
Location within New York City Subway
Location within New York City
Location within New York
Track layout
Street map
Station service legend
Symbol	Description
Stops all times	Stops all times

The DeKalb Avenue station is a station on the BMT Canarsie Line of the New York City Subway. Located at the intersection of Wyckoff and DeKalb Avenues in Bushwick, Brooklyn, it is served by the L train at all times.

== History ==
=== Background ===
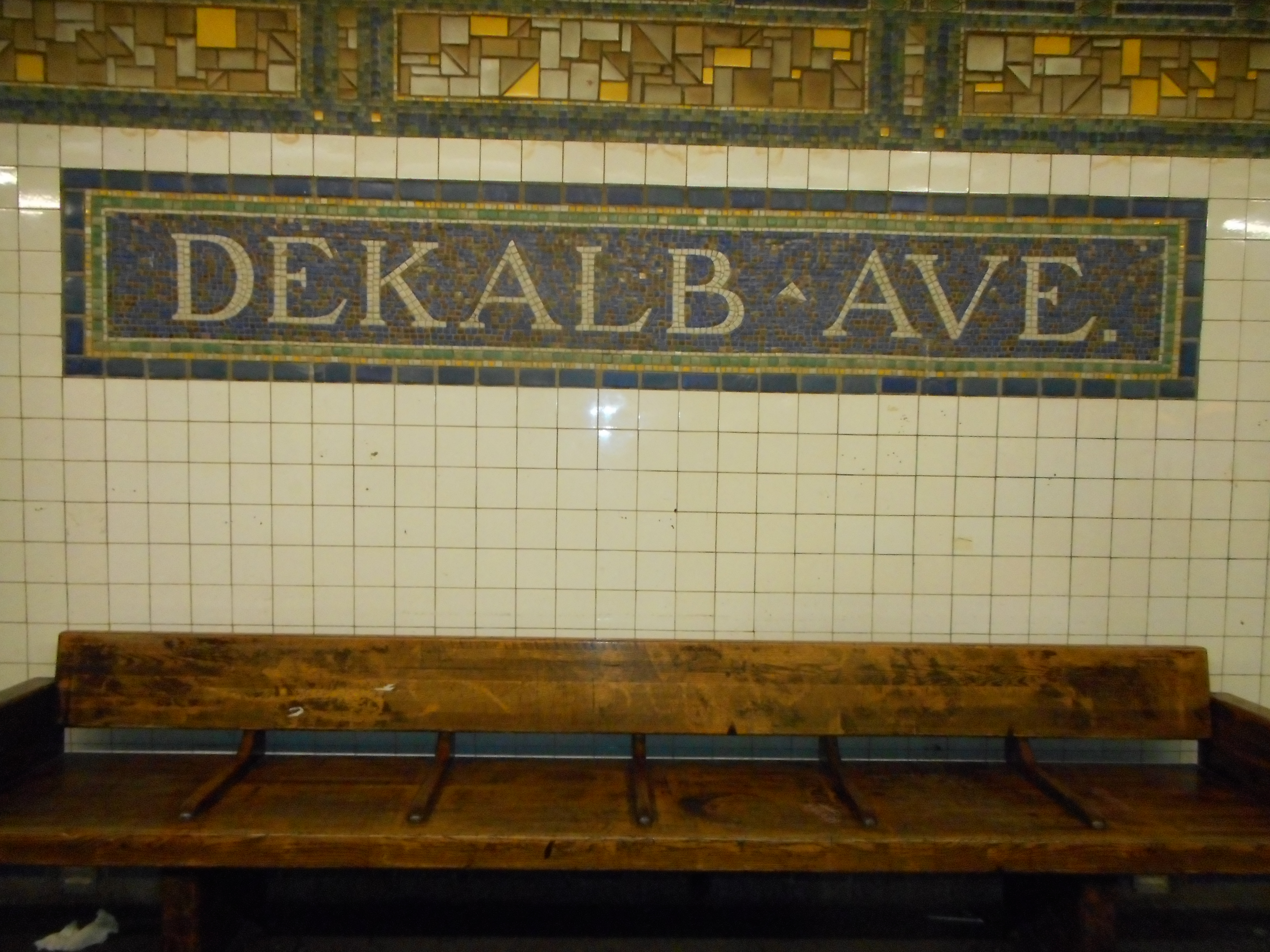
Station name mosaics

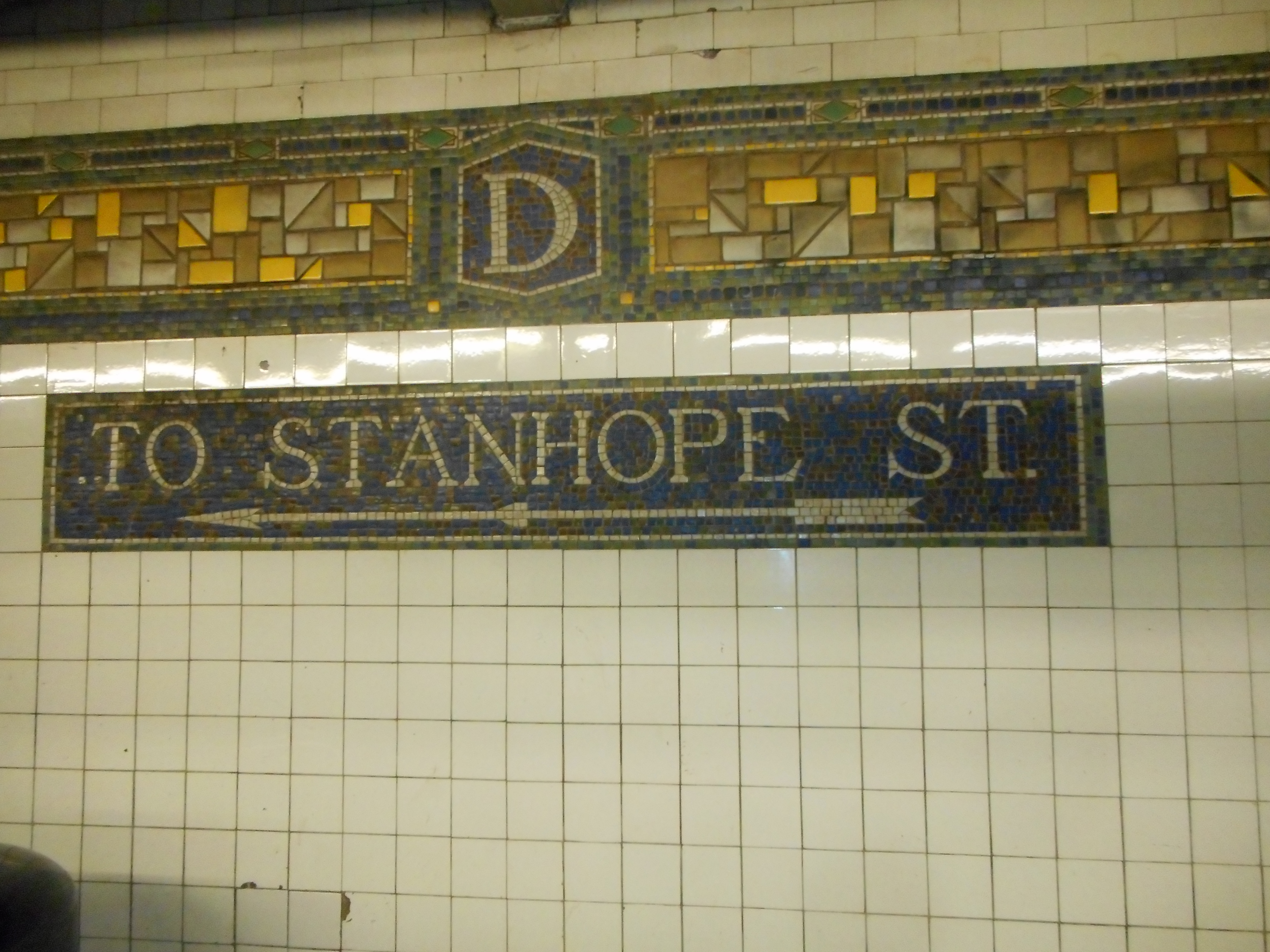
Directional mosaics to Stanhope Street

The Dual Contracts also called for a subway line initially known as the 14th Street–Eastern District Line, usually shortened to 14th Street–Eastern Line. The line would run beneath 14th Street in Manhattan, from Sixth Avenue under the East River and through Williamsburg to Montrose and Bushwick Avenues in Brooklyn. Booth and Flinn was awarded the contract to construct the line on January 13, 1916. Clifford Milburn Holland served as the engineer-in-charge during the construction.

Due to the city's failure to approve the section of the line between Montrose Avenue and East New York, the 14th Street/Eastern Line was initially isolated from the rest of the system. In 1924, a temporary connection was built from the Long Island Rail Road (LIRR)'s Bushwick Yard that ran via Montrose Avenue and then connected to the 14th Street/Eastern Line under Bushwick Avenue just near the Montrose Avenue station. This was done to allow the delivery of BMT Standard subway cars. The first of the cars were delivered by this ramp on June 20, 1924. On June 30, 1924, the section between Sixth Avenue in Manhattan and Montrose Avenue in Brooklyn opened.

=== Construction and opening ===
For the extension of the 14th Street/Eastern Line from Montrose Avenue to East New York, the New York City Board of Estimate had initially given its consent to an elevated line over the Evergreen Branch of the LIRR. The Board of Estimate subsequently refused to allow a construction contract for the elevated line, while the BRT did not want to build an underground line. The extension was changed to an underground alignment following opposition from industries on the Evergreen Branch. In July 1924, the New York City Board of Transportation (BOT) approved a modified route for recommendation to the Board of Estimate. The route would be wholly underground and consist of three tracks. From Montrose Avenue, it would curve east under McKibbin Street, private property, and Harrison Place. Past Varick Avenue, it would turn southeast to Wyckoff Avenue, underneath which it would run to Eldert Street. This plan was to cost $8 million.

In September 1924, the BOT approved the remaining section of the route between Eldert Street and Broadway Junction in East New York. East of Eldert Street, the route would turn south to a ground-level alignment parallel to the LIRR's Bay Ridge Branch, then run southeast in a tunnel underneath private property to the intersection of Eastern Parkway and Bushwick Avenue, where it would emerge onto a ramp leading to the existing Canarsie elevated. An ornamental viaduct over Bushwick Avenue and Eastern Parkway was removed from the original plans due to opposition from property owners.

Three contracts for the construction of the extension were awarded in December at a total cost of $9,531,204. The section from Montrose Avenue to Varick Avenue was awarded to the Underpinning and Foundation Company, while the section from Varick Avenue to Bleecker Street and from Bleecker Street to Halsey Street went to the Oakdale Contracting Company.

On July 14, 1928, the line was extended further east beneath Wyckoff Avenue and then south paralleling the Bay Ridge Branch to a new station at Broadway Junction, above the existing station on the Broadway Elevated (Jamaica Line). At this time, it was connected to the already-operating elevated line to Canarsie. The DeKalb Avenue station opened as part of this extension.

In 2024, the MTA installed low platform-edge fences at the DeKalb Avenue station and several others on the Canarsie Line to reduce the likelihood of passengers falling onto the tracks. The barriers, spaced along the length of the platform, do not have sliding platform screen doors between them.

== Station layout ==
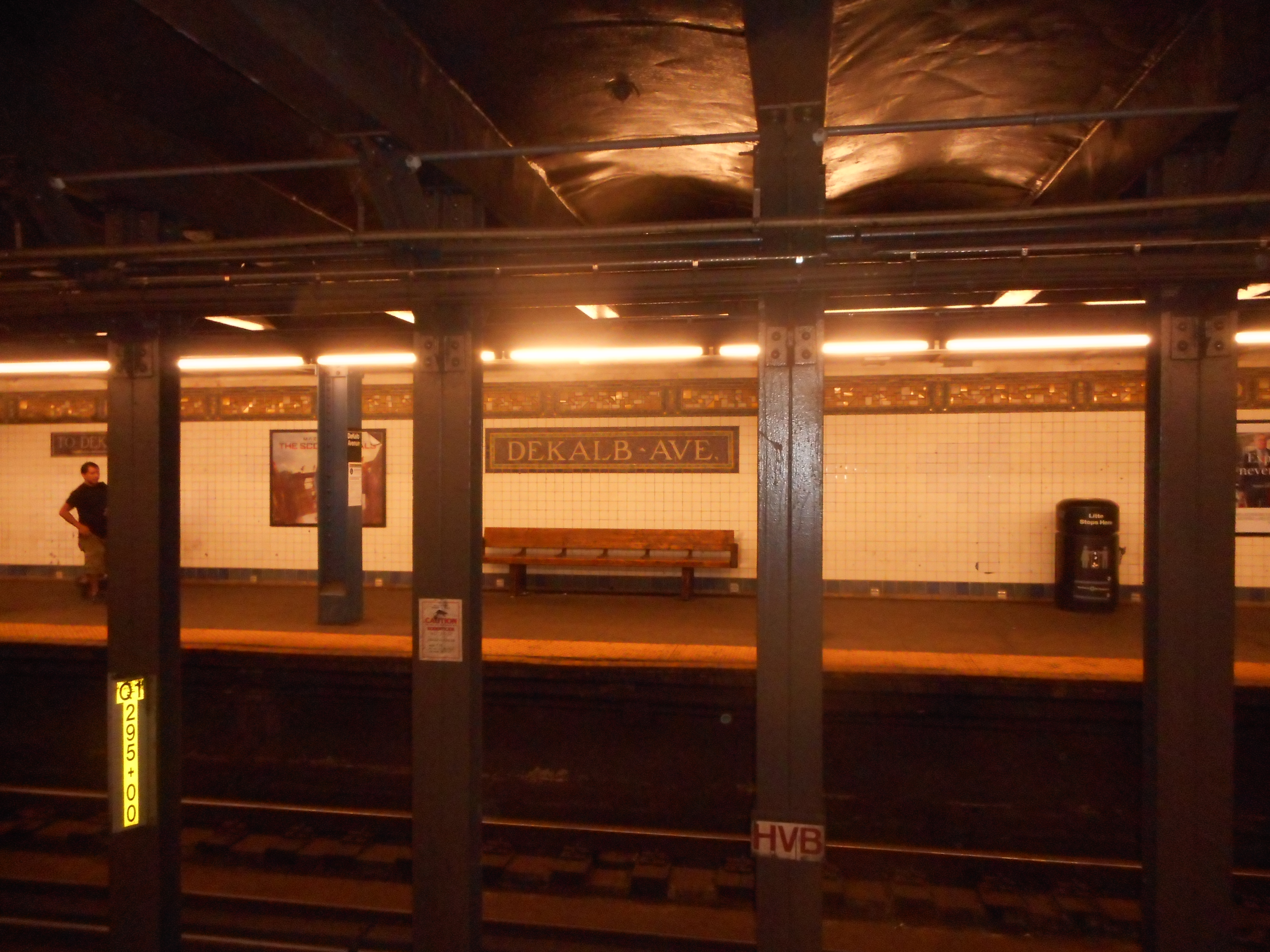
Platform level

This underground station has two tracks and two side platforms. Fixed platform barriers, which are intended to prevent commuters falling to the tracks, are positioned near the platform edges. Each platform has blue columns at regular intervals with every other column having a standard black and white station name plate.

The mosaic tile bands are predominantly green and blue, with yellow and tan accents. Those installed on the stairway from the mezzanine to the Manhattan-bound platform in Summer 2000 feature a seven-inch entrance motif design with a dull green and blue background. The trim line has "D" tablets on it at regular intervals to represent "DeKalb."

=== Exits ===
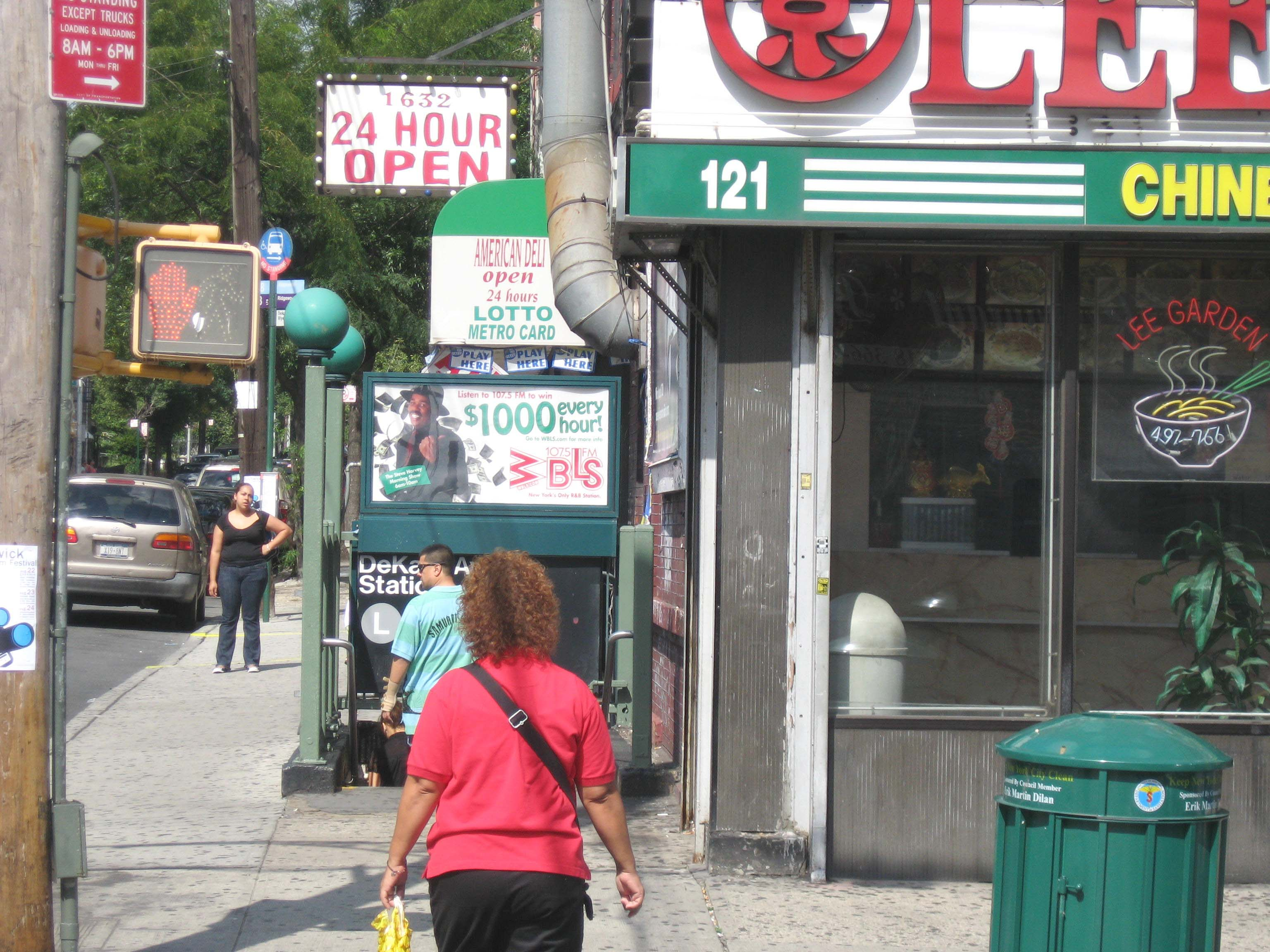
Street entrance

This station has three entrances/exits. The main one is a mezzanine above the platforms and tracks at the west (railroad north) end. It has a single staircase from each platform, waiting area that allows free transfer between directions, turnstile bank, token booth, and four staircases to all corners of DeKalb and Wyckoff Avenues.

The other two entrances/exits are on platform level and unstaffed at the east (railroad south) end. Each fare control area has HEET turnstiles and two street stairs. The ones on the Manhattan-bound platform lead to either northern corners of Wyckoff and Stanhope Street while those on the Canarsie-bound one lead to either southern corners.
