= Grand Street station (BMT Canarsie Line) =

New York City Subway station in Brooklyn

Grand Street
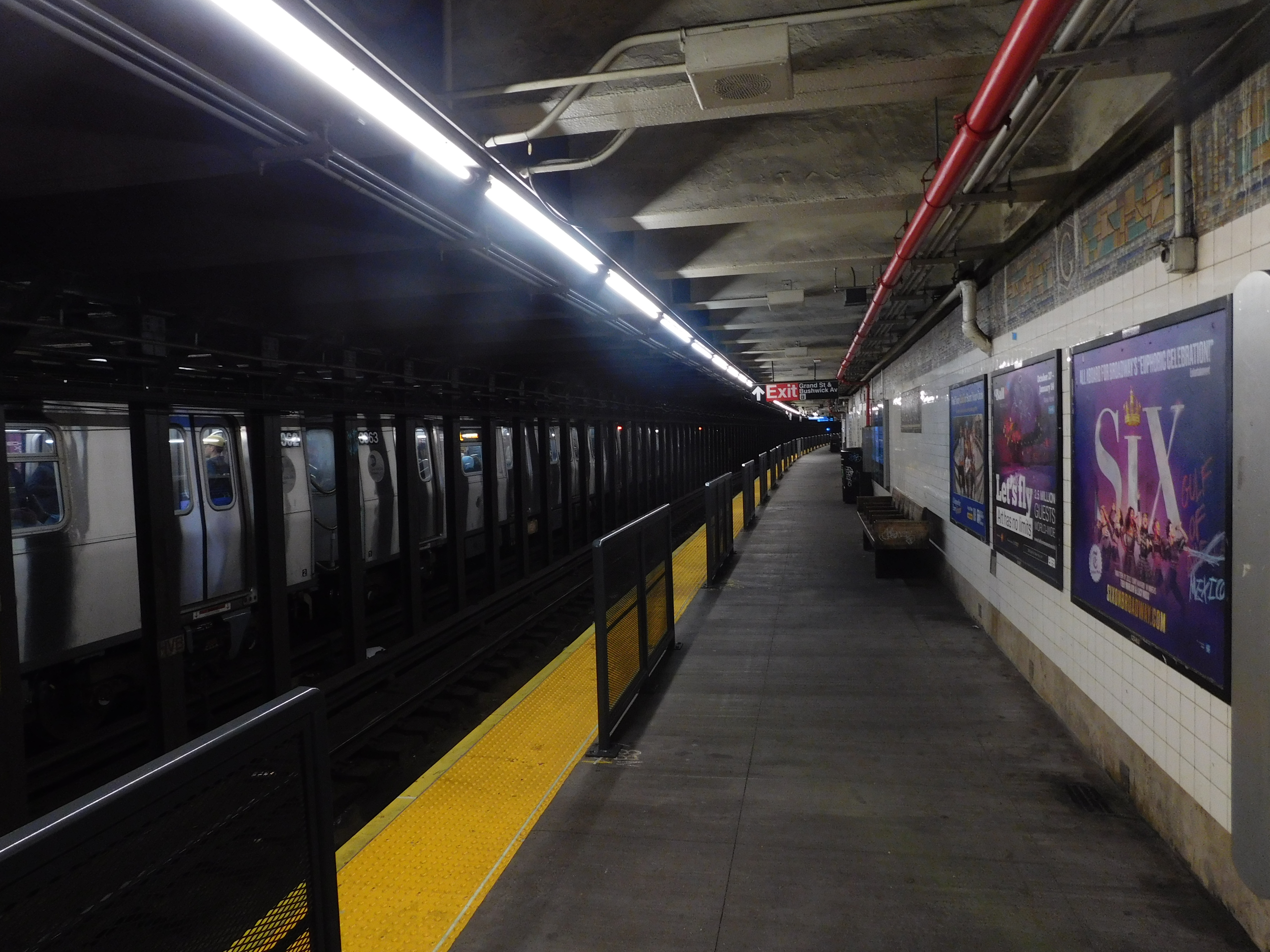

Station statistics
- Address: Grand Street & Bushwick Avenue; Brooklyn, New York
- Borough: Brooklyn
- Locale: Williamsburg, East Williamsburg
- Coordinates: 40.711906°N 73.940735°W
- Division: B (BMT)
- Line: BMT Canarsie Line
- Services: L (all times)
- Transit: NYCT Bus: Q54, Q59
- Structure: Underground
- Platforms: 2 side platforms
- Tracks: 2

Other information
- Opened: June 30, 1924; 102 years ago
- Accessible: Yes

Traffic
- 2025: 1,682,725 ▲7.8%
- Rank: 209 out of 423
Services
Preceding station	New York City Subway	Following station
Graham Avenue toward Eighth Avenue	L (New York City Subway service)	Montrose Avenue toward Canarsie–Rockaway Parkway
Location
Location within New York City Subway
Location within New York City
Location within New York
Track layout
Street map
Station service legend
Symbol	Description
Stops all times	Stops all times

The Grand Street station is a station on the BMT Canarsie Line of the New York City Subway. Located at the intersection of Grand Street and Bushwick Avenue in Brooklyn, it is served by the L train at all times.

== History ==
=== Planning and opening ===
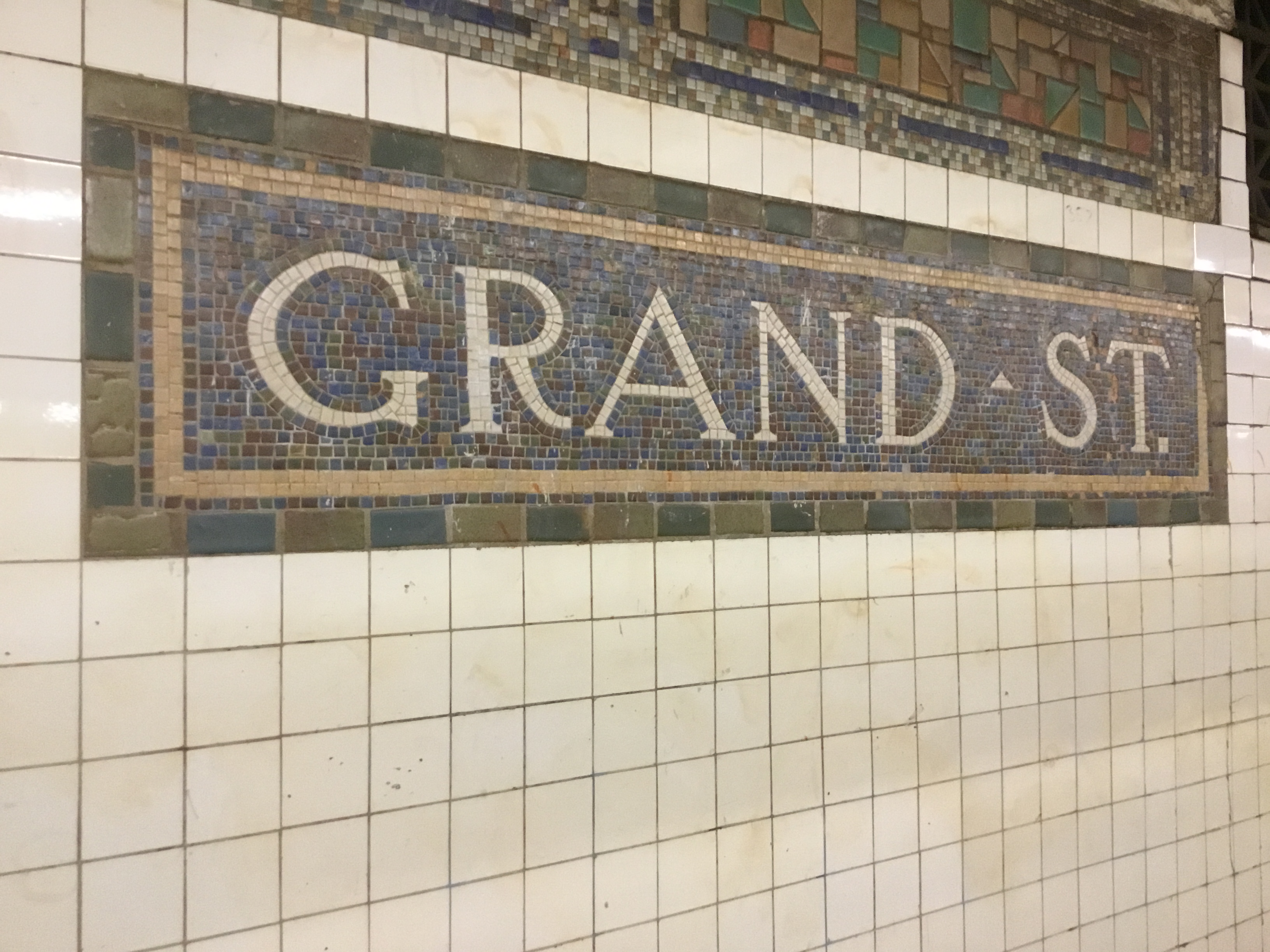
Mosaics showing the station name

In the Dual Contracts, adopted on March 4, 1913, the Brooklyn Rapid Transit Company (BRT; after 1923, the Brooklyn–Manhattan Transit Corporation or BMT) was selected to operate a subway route from 14th Street in Manhattan to Montrose Avenue in Brooklyn. This became the 14th Street–Eastern District Line (later the Canarsie Line. In late 1915, the Public Service Commission began receiving bids for the construction of the 14th Street Line. MacArthur Brothers Co. had received a $1.336 million contract for the construction of section 5 in Brooklyn, which included a station at Grand Street, by June 1916. Organizations such as the Grand Street Board of Trade and the Grand Street Improvement Association were supportive of the project.

The 14th Street Tunnel under the East River had been fully excavated by August 1919. The line's opening was delayed by several years. In 1922, Mayor John Francis Hylan blocked some construction contracts, claiming that the costs were excessively high. The Station Finish Corporation was contracted to build the stations in Brooklyn, including Grand Street. Track-laying in the tunnels between Sixth and Montrose Avenues started in the last week of October 1922. This station opened on June 30, 1924, as part of the initial segment of the Canarsie Line from the Sixth Avenue station in Manhattan to the Montrose Avenue station.

=== Later improvements ===
In 2019, the Metropolitan Transportation Authority announced that this station would become ADA-accessible as part of the agency's 2020–2024 Capital Program. A contract for two elevators at the station was awarded in December 2020 with funding that was originally earmarked for the Penn Station Access project. The new elevators were almost complete by early 2023, and they were finished on August 31, 2023. In 2024, the MTA installed low platform-edge fences at the Grand Street station and several others on the Canarsie Line to reduce the likelihood of passengers falling onto the tracks. The barriers, spaced along the length of the platform, do not have sliding platform screen doors between them.

== Station layout ==
This underground station has two side platforms with two tracks. Fixed platform barriers, which are intended to prevent commuters falling to the tracks, are positioned near the platform edges. The mosaic band on both platforms features greys along with aqua, orange, ochre, light blue, and light green. Near the south end of the station, there are gratings near the ceiling, with the tile band cut out to fit around them. A historically correct section of replacement tile can also be seen in this area. The name tablets read "GRAND ST." in serif font on a brown background, yellow inner border, and green outer border. The platforms are free of columns except near fare control at center.

As part of the MTA Arts & Design program, an artwork titled Gratitudes off Grand, by Glendalys Medina, was installed in the station in 2023. It is composed of two mosaic-glass panels made by Miotto Mosaic Art Studios, each measuring 40 feet (12 m) wide and placed on opposite platforms. The panel on the eastbound platform depicts various ethnicities who have lived in the Bushwick and East Williamsburg neighborhoods, including the native Lenape, Pan-Africans, Italians, Irish, Dominicans, and Puerto Ricans. The westbound platform's panels contain colored motifs, which represent places in the area during each of the four seasons. The colors of the artwork are inspired by Medina's strolls in the neighborhood surrounding the station, while the artwork itself features elements from several cultures, such as Latin American, Taíno, and hip hop culture.

=== Exits ===
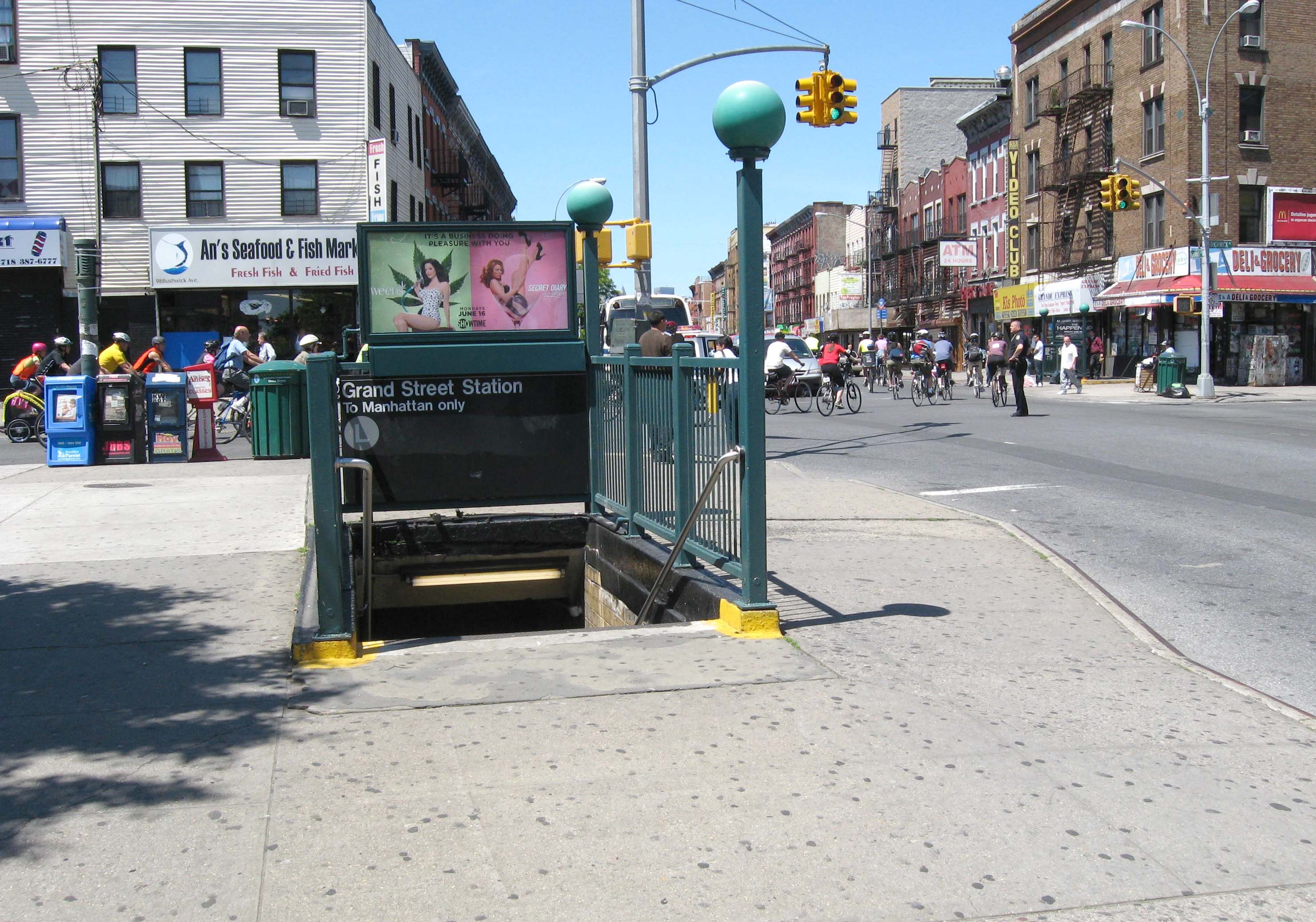
Station stair

Because of its proximity to street level due to cut-and-cover construction, there is no free transfer between directions, and fare control is at platform level. Both sides have a turnstile bank, token booth, and two staircases to the streets. The ones on the Manhattan-bound side go up to either eastern corners of Bushwick Avenue and Grand Street, while the ones on the Canarsie-bound side go up to either western corners. There are two elevators from street level to platform level. The elevator at the northwestern corner of Bushwick Avenue and Grand Street goes down to the eastbound platform, while that at the northeastern corner goes down to the westbound platform.
