= Halsey Street station (BMT Canarsie Line) =

New York City Subway station

Halsey Street
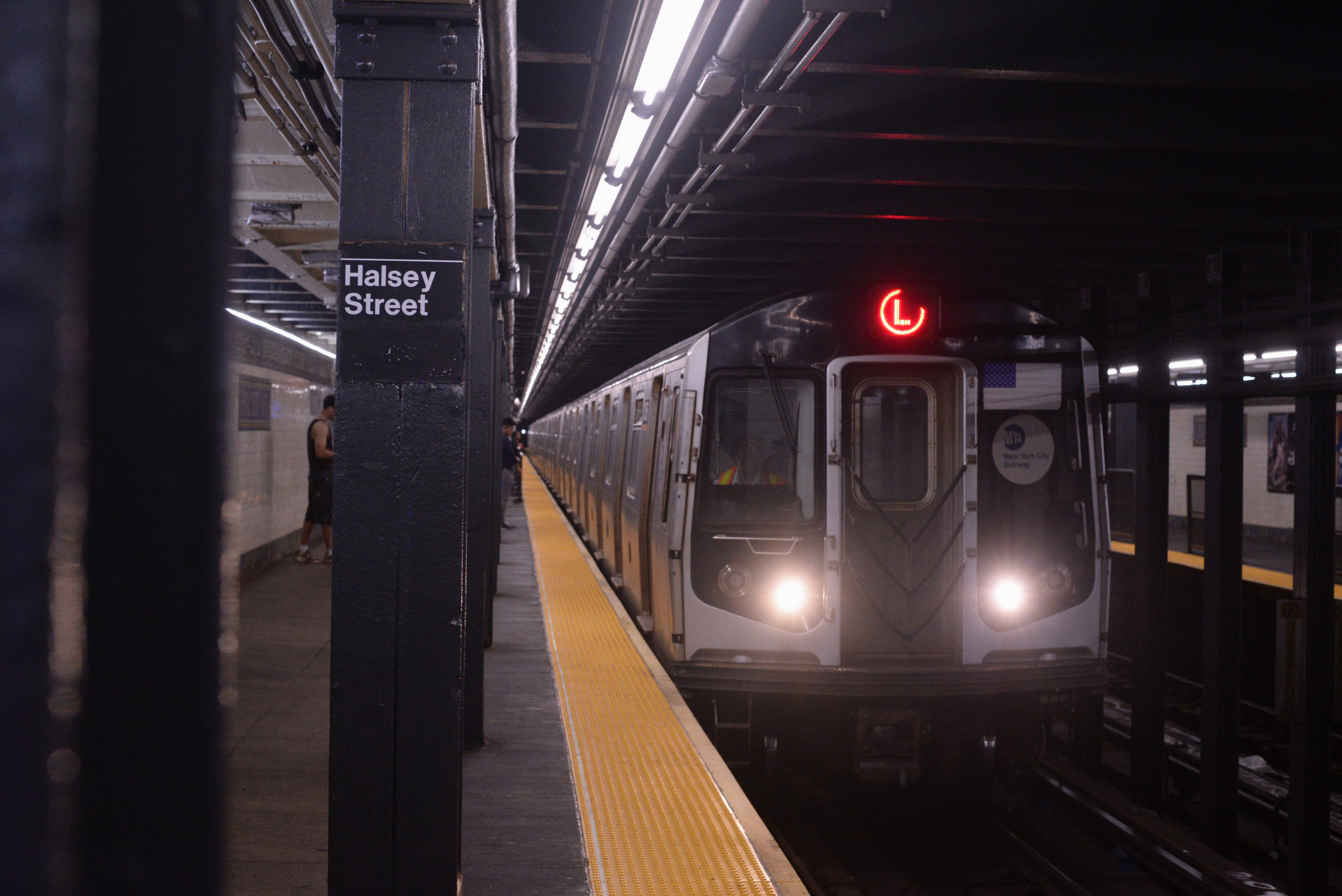
- A Manhattan-bound L train arriving

Station statistics
- Address: Halsey Street & Wyckoff Avenue; Queens, New York
- Borough: On the border of Queens and Brooklyn (mostly in Queens)
- Locale: Ridgewood, Queens and Bushwick, Brooklyn
- Coordinates: 40.696095°N 73.905029°W
- Division: B (BMT)
- Line: BMT Canarsie Line
- Services: L (all times)
- Transit: NYCT Bus: B20, B26
- Structure: Underground
- Platforms: 2 side platforms
- Tracks: 2

Other information
- Opened: July 14, 1928; 98 years ago

Traffic
- 2025: 2,106,839 ▲23%
- Rank: 174 out of 423
Services
Preceding station	New York City Subway	Following station
Myrtle–Wyckoff Avenues toward Eighth Avenue	L (New York City Subway service)	Wilson Avenue toward Canarsie–Rockaway Parkway
Location
Location within New York City Subway
Location within New York City
Location within New York
Track layout
Street map
Station service legend
Symbol	Description
Stops all times	Stops all times

The Halsey Street station is a station on the BMT Canarsie Line of the New York City Subway. Located on the border of Ridgewood, Queens, and Bushwick, Brooklyn, at the intersection of Halsey Street and Wyckoff Avenue, it is served by the L train at all times.

== History ==
=== Background ===
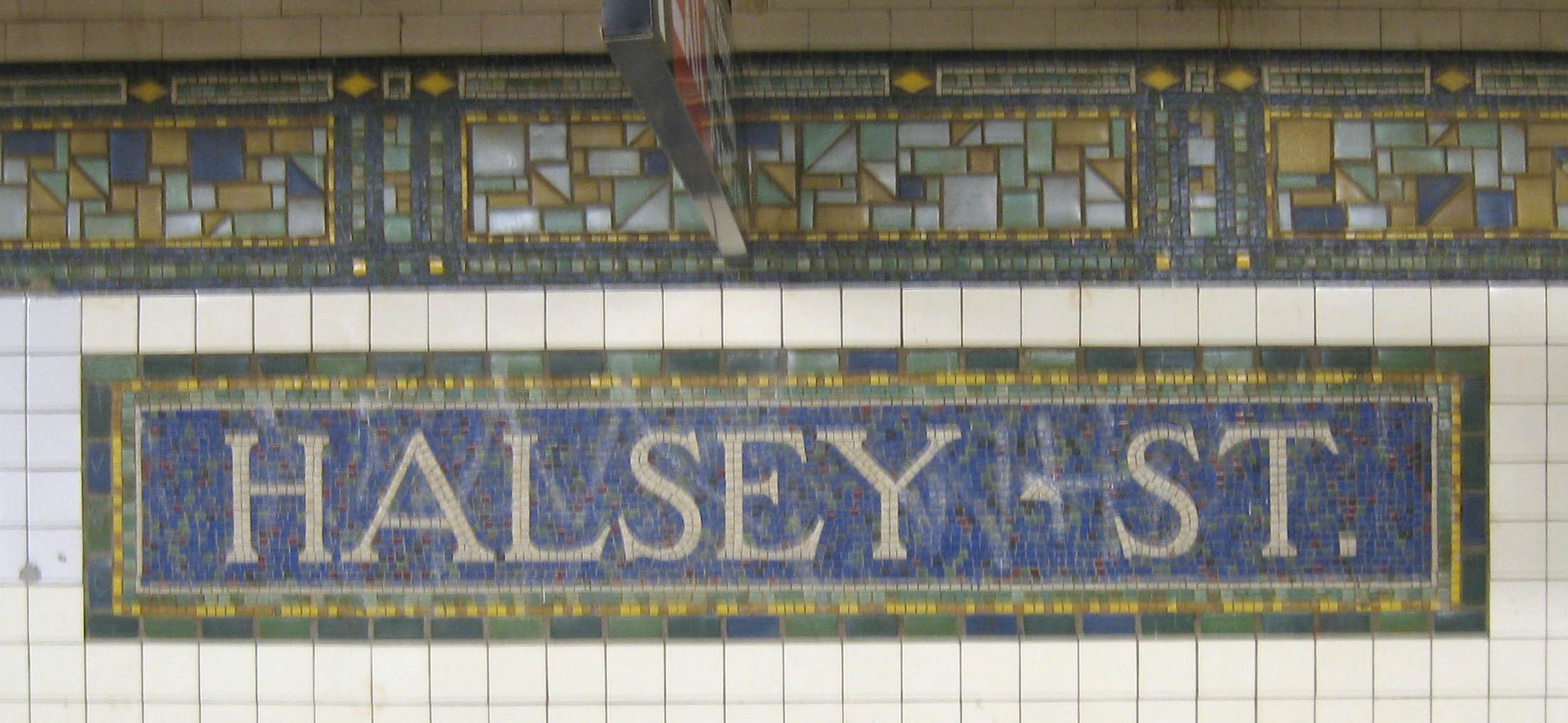
Mosaic name tablet

The Dual Contracts also called for a subway line initially known as the 14th Street–Eastern District Line, usually shortened to 14th Street–Eastern Line. The line would run beneath 14th Street in Manhattan, from Sixth Avenue under the East River and through Williamsburg to Montrose and Bushwick Avenues in Brooklyn. Booth and Flinn was awarded the contract to construct the line on January 13, 1916. Clifford Milburn Holland served as the engineer-in-charge during the construction.

Due to the city's failure to approve the section of the line between Montrose Avenue and East New York, the 14th Street/Eastern Line was initially isolated from the rest of the system. In 1924, a temporary connection was built from the Long Island Rail Road (LIRR)'s Bushwick Yard that ran via Montrose Avenue and then connected to the 14th Street/Eastern Line under Bushwick Avenue just near the Montrose Avenue station. This was done to allow the delivery of BMT Standard subway cars. The first of the cars were delivered by this ramp on June 20, 1924. On June 30, 1924, the section between Sixth Avenue in Manhattan and Montrose Avenue in Brooklyn opened.

=== Construction and opening ===
For the extension of the 14th Street/Eastern Line from Montrose Avenue to East New York, the New York City Board of Estimate had initially given its consent to an elevated line over the Evergreen Branch of the LIRR. The Board of Estimate subsequently refused to allow a construction contract for the elevated line, while the BRT did not want to build an underground line. The extension was changed to an underground alignment following opposition from industries on the Evergreen Branch. In July 1924, the New York City Board of Transportation (BOT) approved a modified route for recommendation to the Board of Estimate. The route would be wholly underground and consist of three tracks. From Montrose Avenue, it would curve east under McKibbin Street, private property, and Harrison Place. Past Varick Avenue, it would turn southeast to Wyckoff Avenue, underneath which it would run to Eldert Street. This plan was to cost $8 million.

In September 1924, the BOT approved the remaining section of the route between Eldert Street and Broadway Junction in East New York. East of Eldert Street, the route would turn south to a ground-level alignment parallel to the LIRR's Bay Ridge Branch, then run southeast in a tunnel underneath private property to the intersection of Eastern Parkway and Bushwick Avenue, where it would emerge onto a ramp leading to the existing Canarsie elevated. An ornamental viaduct over Bushwick Avenue and Eastern Parkway was removed from the original plans due to opposition from property owners.

Three contracts for the construction of the extension were awarded in December at a total cost of $9,531,204. The section from Montrose Avenue to Varick Avenue was awarded to the Underpinning and Foundation Company, while the section from Varick Avenue to Bleecker Street and from Bleecker Street to Halsey Street went to the Oakdale Contracting Company.

On July 14, 1928, the line was extended further east beneath Wyckoff Avenue and then south paralleling the Bay Ridge Branch to a new station at Broadway Junction, above the existing station on the Broadway Elevated (Jamaica Line). At this time, it was connected to the already-operating elevated line to Canarsie. The Halsey Street station opened as part of this extension.

== Station layout ==
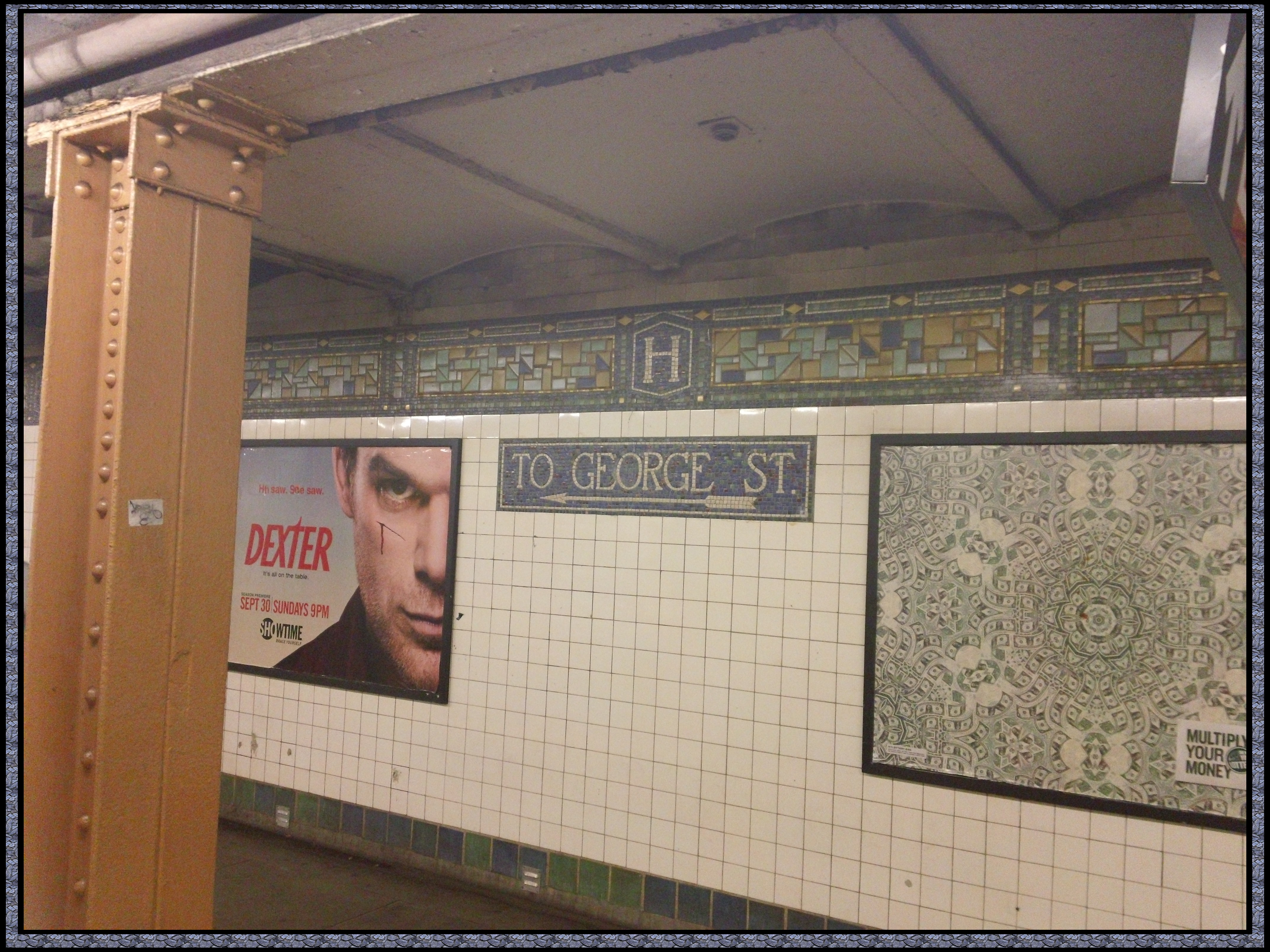
Station mosaics

This station has two tracks and two side platforms. Since all intersections on this section of Wyckoff Avenue are T-intersections, the platforms are offset, with the Manhattan-bound platform built about 60 feet (18 m) further to the east than the Canarsie-bound one. Also, since the Brooklyn-Queens border travels on Wyckoff Avenue for part of the length of this station before turning south, the entire Manhattan-bound platform, as well as the eastern half of the Canarsie-bound platform, is located in Queens. Fixed platform barriers, which are intended to prevent commuters falling to the tracks, are positioned near the platform edges.

Both platforms have their original mosaic tile band that is colored blue and green with yellowish accents. "H" tablets on blue background run along the tile bands at regular intervals. The name tablets read "HALSEY ST." in gold serif font on a blue background and a green, yellow, and blue border. There are also directional signs in gold serif font and outline on a blue background. One of the platforms formerly had two bathrooms. Yellow i-beam columns run along both platforms at regular intervals with alternating ones having the standard black station name plate in white lettering.

=== Exits ===
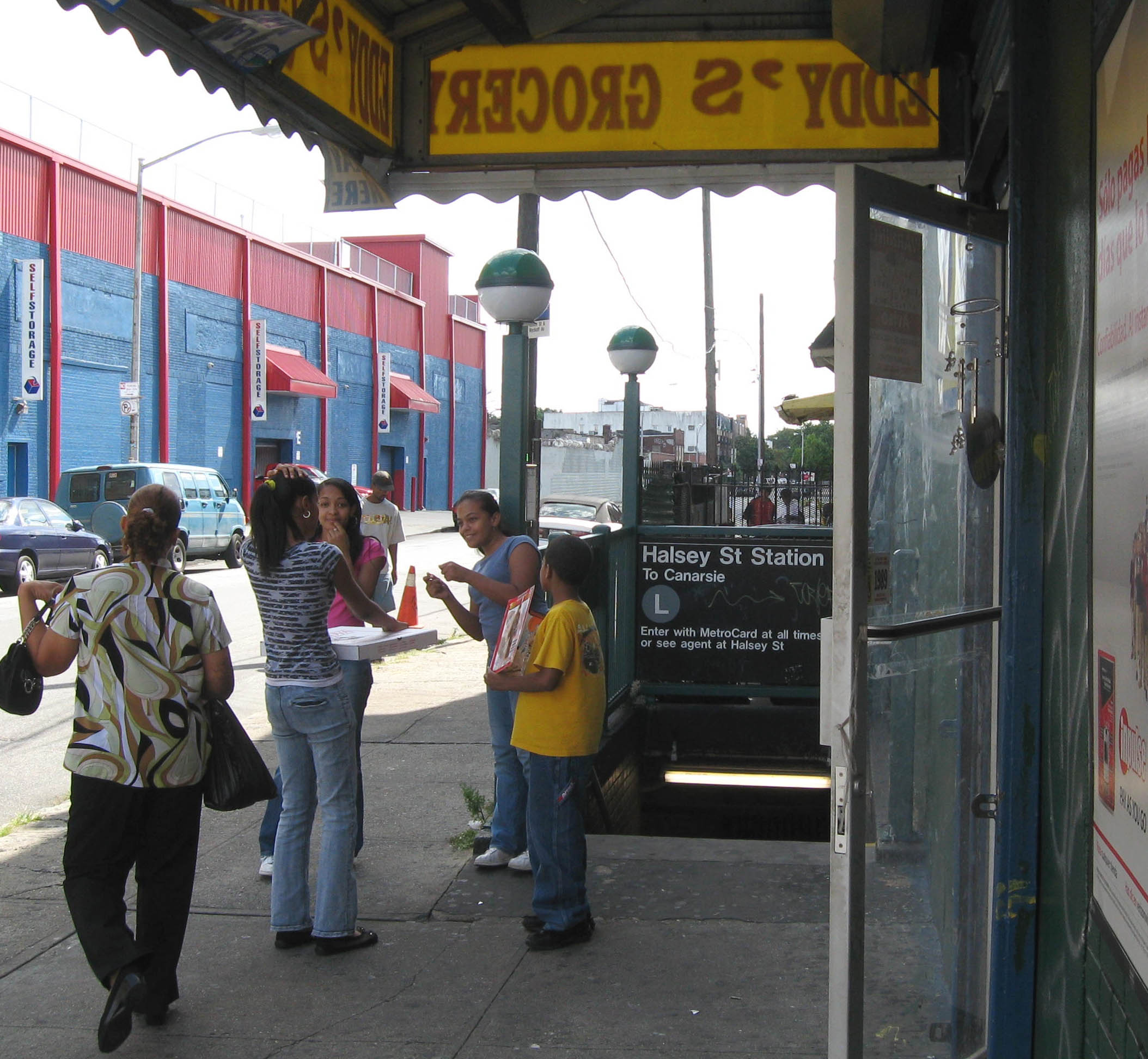
Eastbound street stair

All fare control areas at this station are platform level and there are no crossovers or crossunders. The full-time side is at the west (railroad north) end of the platforms. On the Manhattan-bound side, a turnstile bank leads to the full-time token booth and one staircase going up to the northwest corner of Wyckoff Avenue and George Street. On the Canarsie-bound side, a turnstile bank leads to a part-time customer assistance booth and one staircase going up to the southwest corner of Halsey Street and Wyckoff Avenue.

Both platforms have an unstaffed fare control area at their east (railroad south) end. A set of full height turnstiles leads to a single street stair. The Manhattan-bound staircase goes up to the northeast corner of Norman Street and Wyckoff Avenue while the Canarsie-bound staircase goes up to the southwest corner of Covert Street and Wyckoff Avenue.

== Incidents ==
This station was the site of a 1988 arson that killed a token booth clerk, 39-year-old Mona Pierre. Robbers squirted accelerant into the booth on the platform and set the fumes alight with a match, destroying the booth and killing the clerk. This incident inspired a robbery scene in the 1995 film Money Train.

== In popular culture ==
The New Jersey-born singer Halsey chose it as her stage name because she began songwriting while living nearby.
