= L (New York City Subway service) =

Rapid transit service

- 14th Street–Canarsie Local

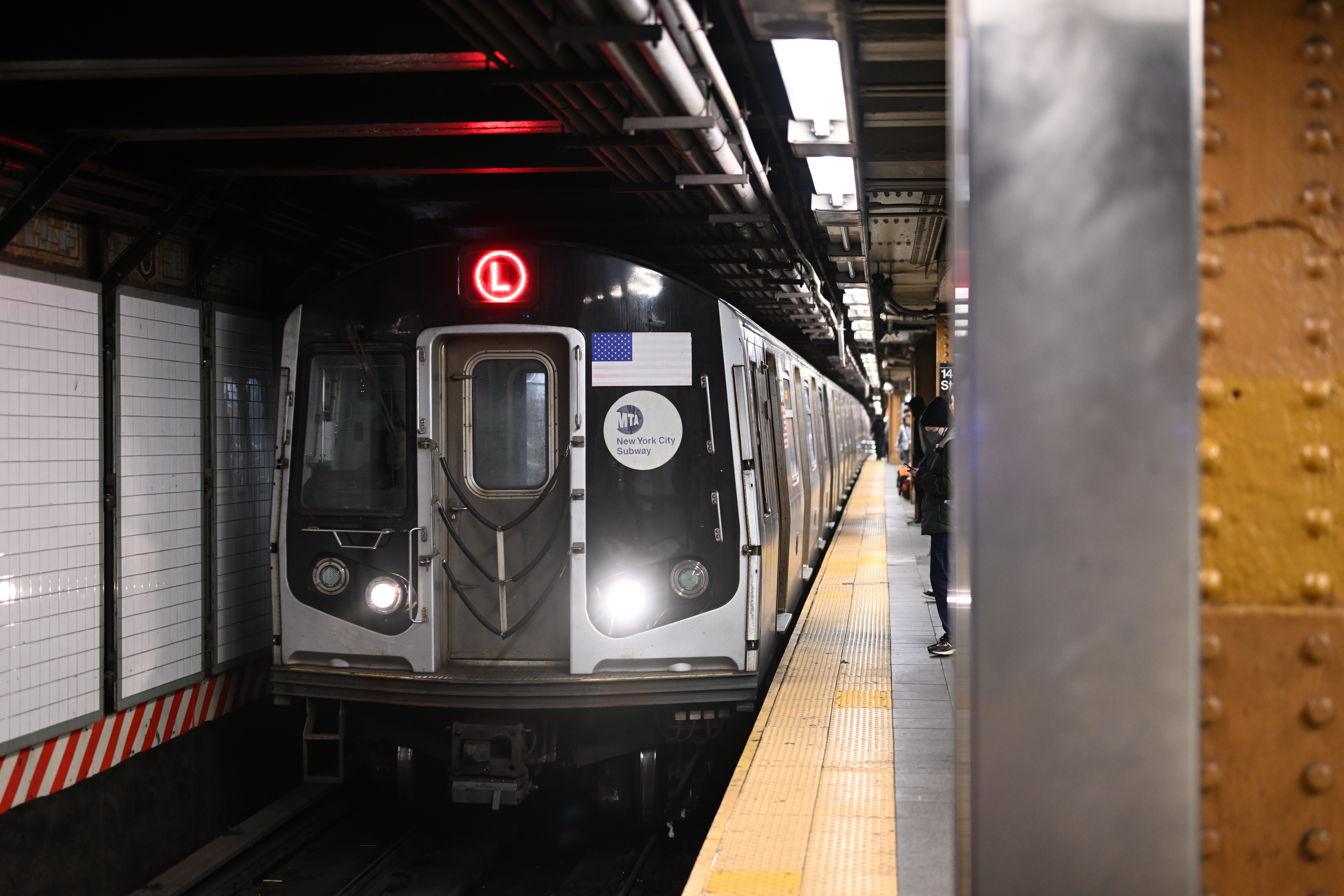
- L train of R160A–1s entering 14th Street–Union Square

- Western end: Eighth Avenue
- Eastern end: Rockaway Parkway
- Stations: 24
- Rolling stock: R143; R160 (Rolling stock assignments subject to change)
- Depot: East New York Yard
- Started service: June 30, 1924; 102 years ago

The L 14th Street–Canarsie Local is a rapid transit service in the B Division of the New York City Subway. Its route emblem, or "bullet", is colored medium gray since it serves the BMT Canarsie Line.

The L operates 24 hours daily between Eighth Avenue in Chelsea, Manhattan, and Rockaway Parkway in Canarsie, Brooklyn, making all stops along the full route. It also briefly enters Queens at Halsey Street, serving the neighborhood of Ridgewood. It is the first New York City Subway service to be automated using communications-based train control.

The L commenced its current route and service pattern upon completion of the Canarsie Line in 1928. Express trains formerly ran along the L's trackage in central Brooklyn, running along the BMT Fulton Street Line in eastern Brooklyn, but were discontinued in 1956. Since then, the L has been entirely local.

The L was originally the Brooklyn–Manhattan Transit Corporation's 16 service. The 16 became the LL in 1967 and then the L in 1985. In the early 2000s, the L saw a dramatic increase in ridership since many neighborhoods along the route have experienced gentrification. From April 2019 to April 2020, late-night and weekend L service between Manhattan and Brooklyn was temporarily reduced as part of the 14th Street Tunnel shutdown, which sought to repair damage to the 14th Street Tunnel incurred by Hurricane Sandy in 2012.

== History ==
=== Early history ===
==== 1924–1967 ====
The L was originally given the LL designation when letters were assigned to the BMT division. From 1928 to 1967, the same service was assigned the BMT number 16.

In 1924, part of the eventual 14th Street–Canarsie Line opened, called the "14th Street–Eastern District Line" (commonly the "14th Street–Eastern Line"), and was given the number 16. This was extended east, and in 1928 it was joined to the existing BMT Canarsie Line east of Broadway Junction. Since that time, the 14th Street–Canarsie Line service has operated as it is today, except for an extension from Sixth Avenue to Eighth Avenue, which opened on May 30, 1931, to connect to the new Eighth Avenue Subway. The Eighth Avenue Terminal was originally built in IND style and has been restored to BMT style like Fulton Street and Broad Street. During rush hours, express service ran nonstop between Lorimer Street and Myrtle–Wyckoff Avenues. (Locals usually ran from Eighth Avenue to Myrtle–Wyckoff Avenues or Atlantic Avenue at these times.)

Before the 14th Street–Eastern and Canarsie Lines were connected, the Canarsie part of the line already had a number, 14, running from Lower Manhattan via the Broadway Elevated and called the Canarsie Line. When the 14th Street–Eastern Line was connected in 1928, this was renamed the Broadway (Brooklyn) Line, but continued to operate to Rockaway Parkway.

Starting on September 23, 1936, express trains ran to Lefferts Boulevard via the connection with the Fulton Street Elevated at Atlantic Avenue. This connection was severed on April 30, 1956, then the service ran to Rockaway Parkway again, but was discontinued on August 23. The R27 to R38's roll signs had both L and LL for express and local service, even though the express never ran thereafter.

==== 1967–1985 ====
On November 26, 1967, with the opening of the Chrystie Street Connection, the BMT Eastern Division lines were given letters. The 14 to Canarsie was given the label JJ (though the 14 main line was designated KK, continuing east from Broadway Junction towards Jamaica). On the other hand, the 16 became the LL. Canarsie service to Lower Manhattan was discontinued in 1968. When double letters were dropped on May 5, 1985, the LL became the L, and it still has that designation.

=== Skip-stop service proposal ===
In January 1991, skip-stop service was proposed to speed service during the height of rush hours in the peak direction which would have reduced the running time from 41 minutes to 37 minutes. Under this plan, the K designation, which was previously used as the Broadway Brooklyn Local from 1967 to 1976, and as the Eighth Avenue Local from 1985 to 1988, would be repurposed and would appear in a gray bullet similar to the color the L uses. Both services would have common stops at Rockaway Parkway, Broadway Junction (then called Eastern Parkway), Myrtle Avenue, Lorimer Street, First Avenue, Union Square, Sixth Avenue and Eighth Avenue. L trains would stop at East 105th Street, Livonia Avenue, Atlantic Avenue, Wilson Avenue, DeKalb Avenue, Morgan Avenue, Grand Street, and Bedford Avenue; K trains would stop at New Lots Avenue, Sutter Avenue, Bushwick Avenue–Aberdeen Street, Halsey Street, Jefferson Street, Montrose Avenue, Graham Avenue and Third Avenue. This change was proposed as a service improvement alongside other changes that would have either reduced or eliminated service to balance the MTA's operational budget and would have been implemented in October 1991, pending approval from the MTA board.

=== Modernization and rehabilitation ===
==== Ridership and CBTC ====
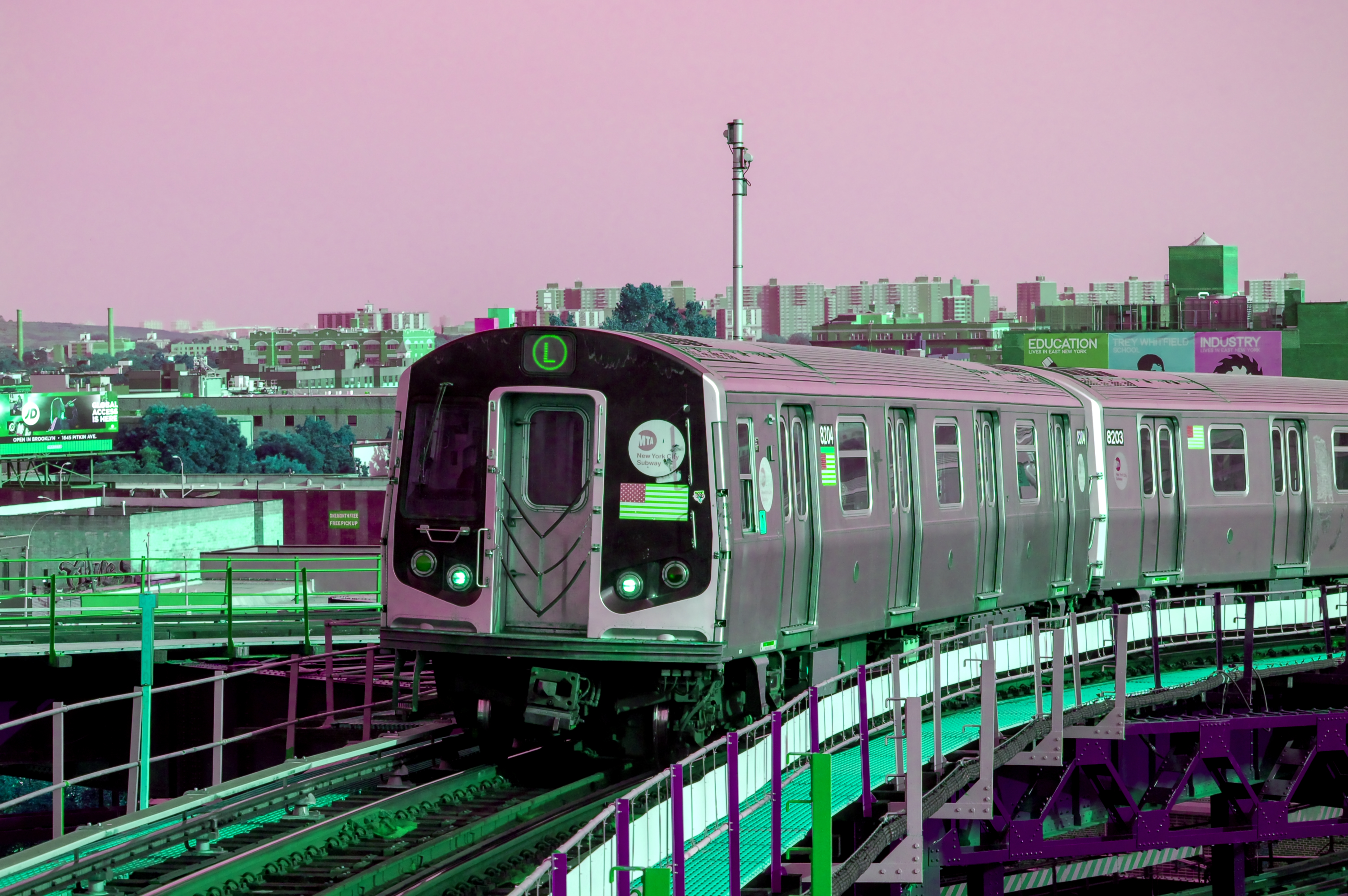
R143 L train entering Broadway Junction for Eighth Avenue

Ridership

Annual ridership for the L service:

- 1994 . . . 16,968,025
- 1996 . . . 18,107,243
- 1998 . . . 21,196,693
- 2000 . . . 26,155,806
- 2005 . . . 30,452,319

Headways:

- Morning and evening rush hours: 4 minutes
- Midday: 6–8 minutes
- Overnight: 20 minutes

The 5 busiest stations in 2005:

1. First Avenue, Manhattan
2. Bedford Avenue, Williamsburg, Brooklyn
3. Canarsie–Rockaway Parkway, Canarsie, Brooklyn
4. DeKalb Avenue, Bushwick, Brooklyn
5. Graham Avenue, Williamsburg, Brooklyn

The stations with greatest ridership increases in 2014:

- Bushwick Avenue–Aberdeen Street, Bushwick, Brooklyn
- Wilson Avenue, Bushwick, Brooklyn
- Jefferson Street, Bushwick, Brooklyn

Ridership on the L has increased dramatically since 2000 since many neighborhoods along the route have experienced gentrification. The Metropolitan Transportation Authority's $443 million fleets of subway cars on the L was introduced in 2002, but by 2006 was already too small to handle growing ridership. The Transit Authority had projected that 212 Kawasaki-made R143 subway cars would be enough to accommodate ridership demands for years to come, but ridership has risen higher than expected. Therefore, sixty-four new R160A cars manufactured by Alstom were equipped with CBTC so they could run on the L.

The BMT Canarsie Line tracks underwent an extensive retrofit over to CBTC, a system that controls the trains via a computer onboard, as opposed manually operated by a human operator. This was completed in early 2009. While the retrofit has resulted in nearly two years of service changes and station closings, this system will eventually allow trains to run closer together and enables in-station "countdown clock" displays to note the exact time until the next train arrives. The line also used OPTO (one person train operation) beginning in June 2005, but a combination of public outcry regarding perceived safety issues, which increased after the July 2005 London tube bombings, heavy lobbying by the Transport Workers Union of America (TWU), as well as an arbitration ruling that MTA had breached its contract with TWU caused the Metropolitan Transportation Authority to end OPTO the following September. However, the MTA's successful implementation of countdown clocks on the L was the first in the system.

On April 27, 2003, midday L service was reduced to run every 8 minutes instead of every 6 minutes.

==== 14th Street Tunnel shutdown ====
Starting April 27, 2019, L service was limited between Third Avenue and Bedford Avenue on late nights and weekends to allow for repairs on the Canarsie Line tunnels under the East River, which were badly damaged by Hurricane Sandy in 2012. Trains in both directions operated on one tube between Third and Bedford Avenues while late night and weekend work was done on the other tube. The original plan was for a full 15-month closure with both tubes closed simultaneously west of Bedford Avenue, but the plans were revised in January 2019. On April 26, 2020, New York governor Andrew Cuomo announced the completion of the project, months ahead of schedule.

== Signage history ==
16/L/LL services

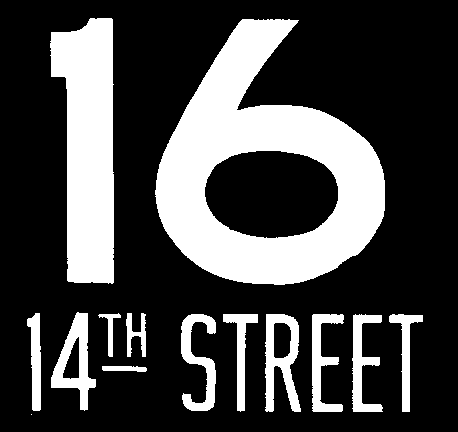
Pre-1967 BMT 16 bullet used on the R1s to R38s

1967-1979 bullet

1979-1985 bullet

The current bullet used since 1985
Proposed K service

Proposed 1991 K skip-stop bullet for the BMT Canarsie Line

== Route ==
=== Service pattern ===
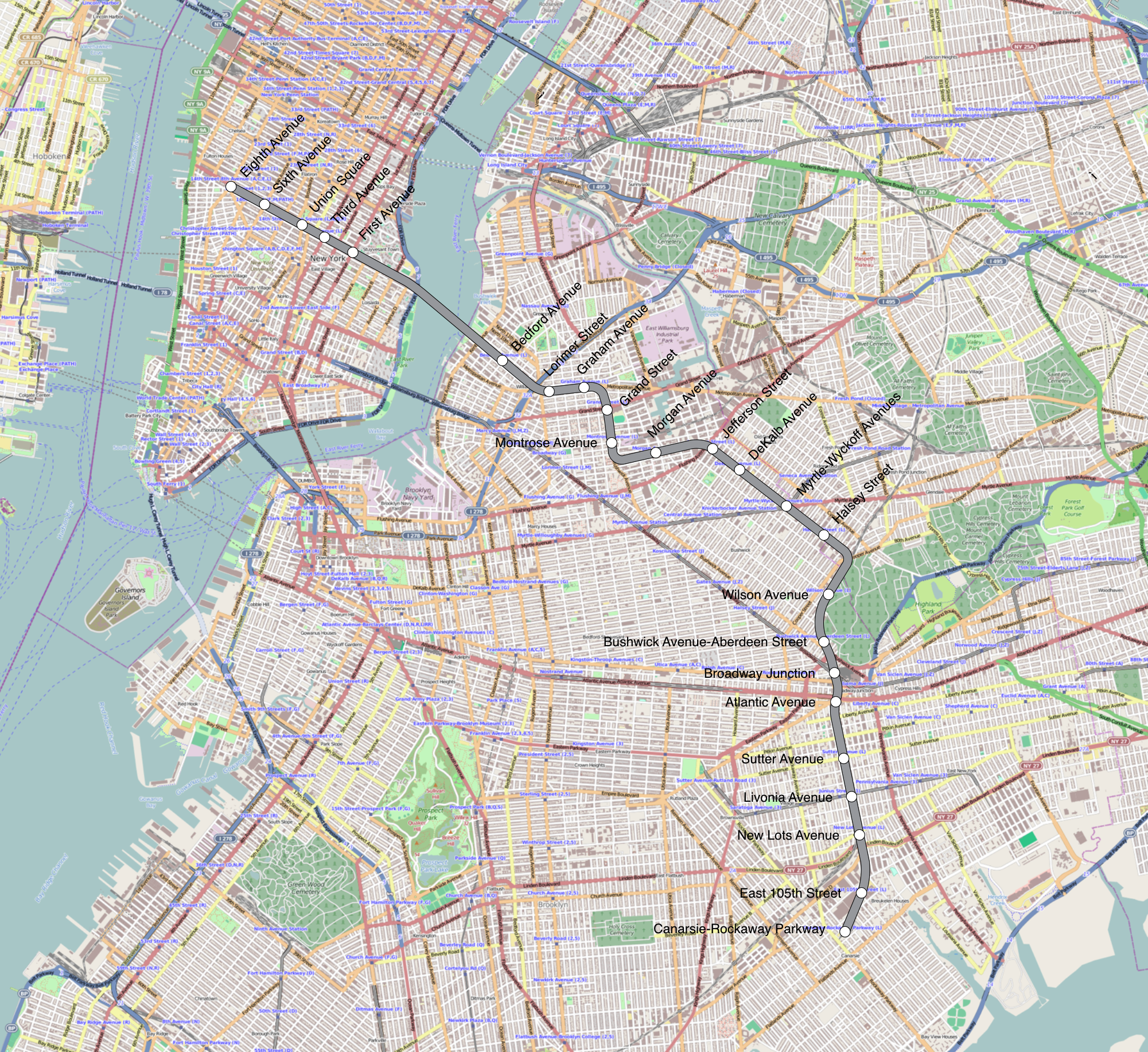
To scale line map

The L uses the following lines with the same service pattern at all times.

Line	From	To	Tracks
BMT Canarsie Line	Eighth Avenue	Canarsie–Rockaway Parkway	all

=== Stations ===
The L runs on the BMT Canarsie Line in its entirety.

Station service legend
Stops all times	Stops 24 hours a day
Stops all times except late nights	Stops every day during daytime hours only
Stops late nights only	Stops every day during overnight hours only
Stops weekdays during the day	Stops during weekday daytime hours only
Station closed	Station closed
Stops rush hours in the peak direction only	Stops rush hours/weekdays in the peak direction only
Time period details
Disabled access	Station is compliant with the Americans with Disabilities Act
↑	Station is compliant with the Americans with Disabilities Act in the indicated direction only
↓	Station is compliant with the Americans with Disabilities Act in the indicated direction only
	Elevator access to mezzanine only

L service	Stations	Disabled access	Subway transfers	Connections
Manhattan
Canarsie Line
Stops all times	Eighth Avenue	Disabled access	A C E (IND Eighth Avenue Line at 14th Street)	M14A / M14D Select Bus Service
Stops all times	Sixth Avenue	Disabled access	F <F> M (IND Sixth Avenue Line at 14th Street); 1 2 3 (IRT Broadway–Seventh Avenue Line at 14th Street)	PATH at 14th Street; M14A / M14D Select Bus Service
Stops all times	Union Square	Disabled access	4 5 6 <6> (IRT Lexington Avenue Line); N Q R W (BMT Broadway Line)	M14A / M14D Select Bus Service
Stops all times	Third Avenue			M14A / M14D Select Bus Service
Stops all times	First Avenue	Disabled access		M14A / M14D Select Bus Service; Northbound M15 Select Bus Service
Brooklyn
Stops all times	Bedford Avenue	Disabled access		NYC Ferry: East River Route (at North Sixth Street west of Kent Avenue)
Stops all times	Lorimer Street	Disabled access	G (IND Crosstown Line at Metropolitan Avenue)	
Stops all times	Graham Avenue			
Stops all times	Grand Street	Disabled access		
Stops all times	Montrose Avenue			
Stops all times	Morgan Avenue			
Stops all times	Jefferson Street			
Stops all times	DeKalb Avenue			
Stops all times	Myrtle–Wyckoff Avenues	Disabled access	M (BMT Myrtle Avenue Line)	Some a.m. rush hour trips begin or end their runs to/from Eighth Avenue at this station
Stops all times	Halsey Street			
Stops all times	Wilson Avenue	↑		Station is ADA-accessible in the northbound direction only.
Stops all times	Bushwick Avenue–Aberdeen Street			
Stops all times	Broadway Junction		A C (IND Fulton Street Line); J Z (BMT Jamaica Line)	
Stops all times	Atlantic Avenue			LIRR Atlantic Branch at East New York
Stops all times	Sutter Avenue			
Stops all times	Livonia Avenue	Disabled access	Out-of-system transfer with MetroCard/OMNY: 2 3 4 5 (IRT New Lots Line at Junius Street)	
Stops all times	New Lots Avenue			B15 bus to JFK Int'l Airport
Stops all times	East 105th Street			Some northbound rush hour trips begin at this station
Stops all times	Canarsie–Rockaway Parkway	Disabled access		B82 Select Bus Service; free out-of-station transfer to B42 bus and westbound B6 and B82 buses.
