= Montrose Avenue station =

New York City Subway station in Brooklyn

Montrose Avenue
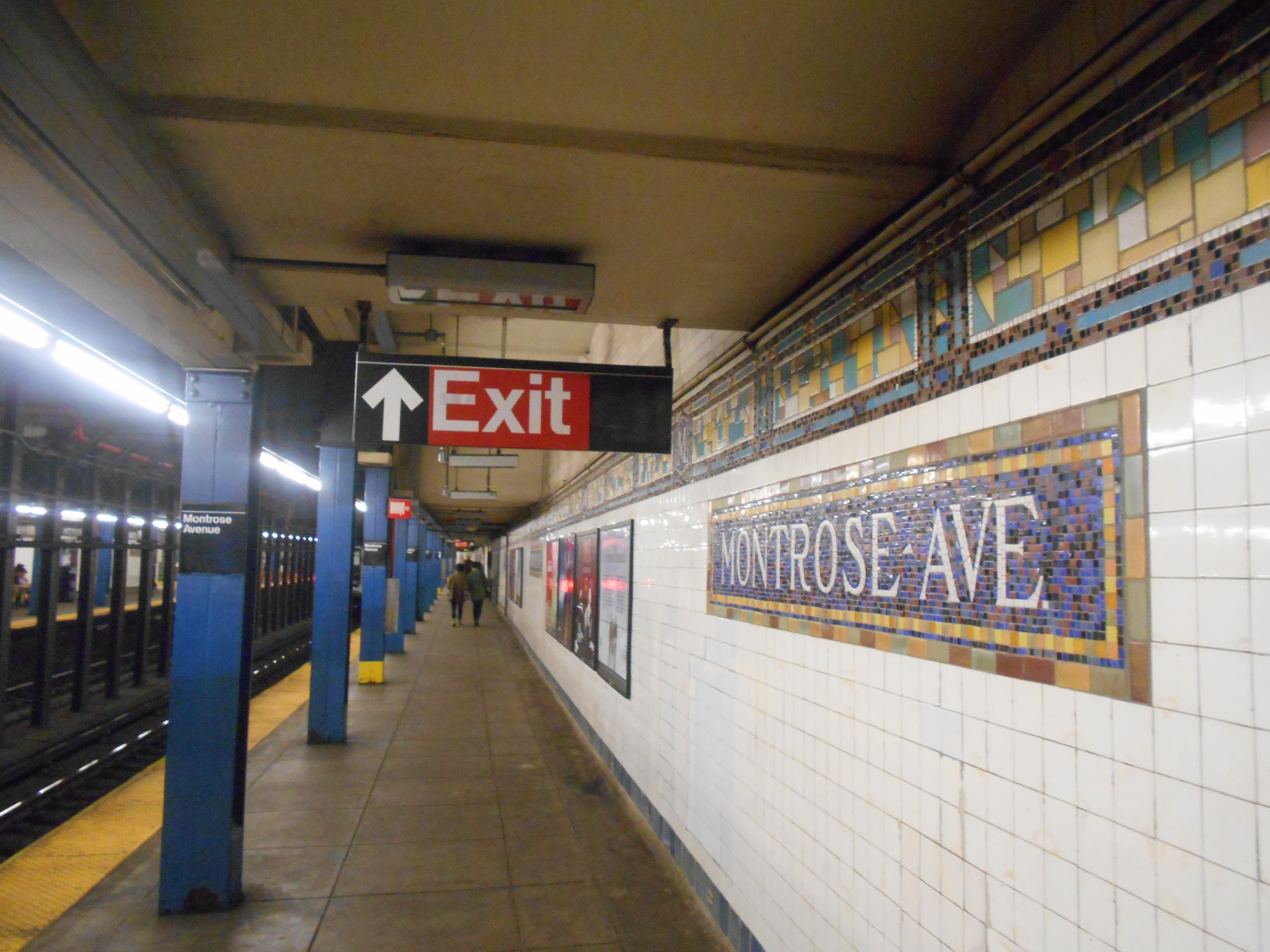

Station statistics
- Address: Montrose Avenue & Bushwick Avenue; Brooklyn, New York
- Borough: Brooklyn
- Locale: East Williamsburg, Williamsburg
- Coordinates: 40.707612°N 73.939877°W
- Division: B (BMT)
- Line: BMT Canarsie Line
- Services: L (all times)
- Transit: NYCT Bus: B60
- Structure: Underground
- Platforms: 2 side platforms
- Tracks: 2

Other information
- Opened: June 30, 1924; 102 years ago

Traffic
- 2025: 1,827,053 ▲6.9%
- Rank: 194 out of 423
Services
Preceding station	New York City Subway	Following station
Grand Street toward Eighth Avenue	L (New York City Subway service)	Morgan Avenue toward Canarsie–Rockaway Parkway
Location
Location within New York City Subway
Location within New York City
Location within New York
Track layout
Street map
Station service legend
Symbol	Description
Stops all times	Stops all times

The Montrose Avenue station is a station on the BMT Canarsie Line of the New York City Subway. Located at the intersection of Montrose and Bushwick Avenues on the border of East Williamsburg and Williamsburg in Brooklyn, it is served by the L train at all times.

== History ==
This station opened on June 30, 1924 as the eastern terminus of the initial segment of the underground Canarsie Line, a product of the Dual Contracts, stretching west to Sixth Avenue station in Manhattan.

Originally, the Canarsie Line was planned to be elevated between Montrose Avenue and Broadway Junction, running above the Evergreen Branch of the Long Island Rail Road. This was changed to an underground alignment following opposition from industries on the Evergreen Branch.

== Station layout ==
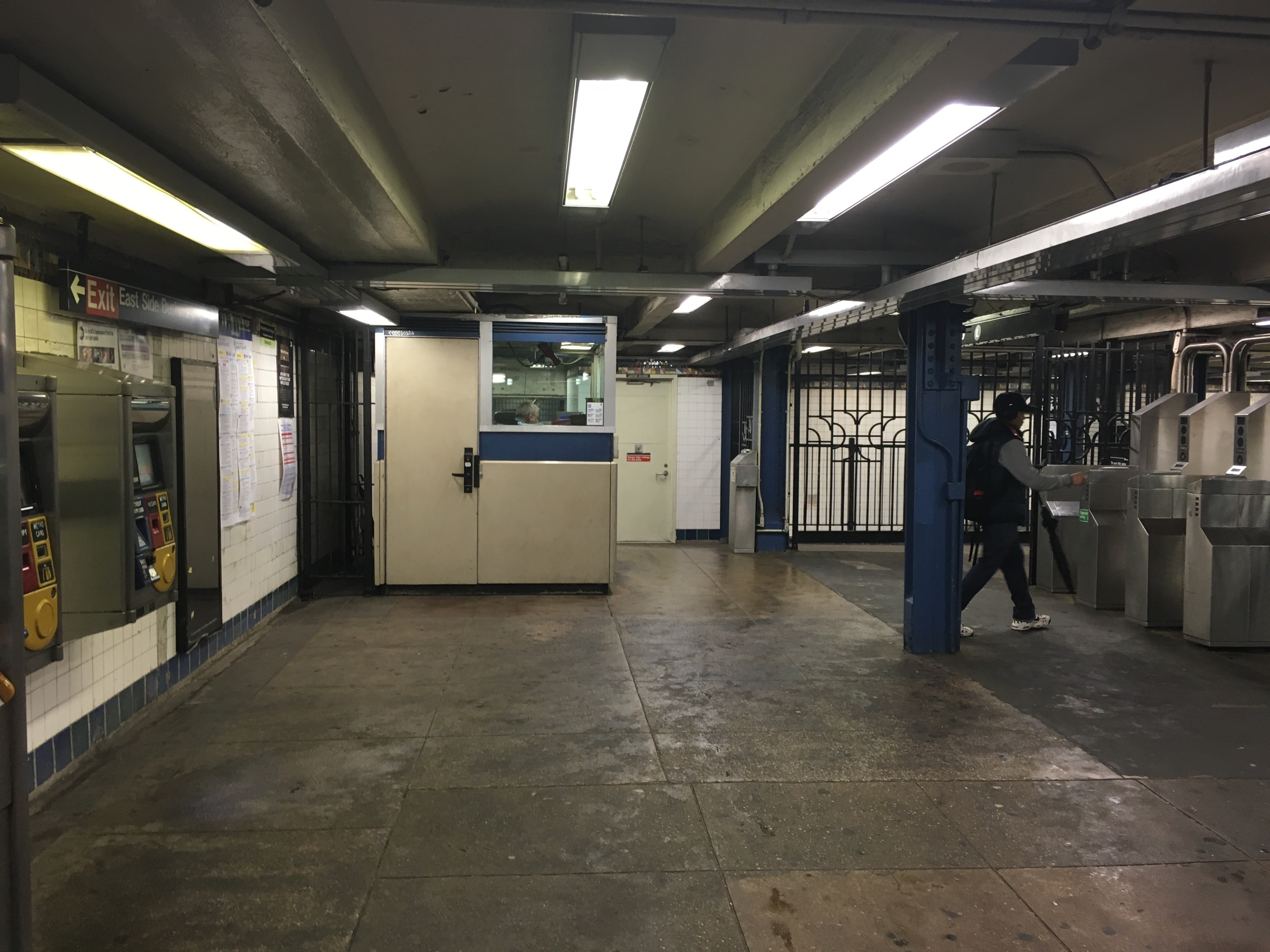
Mezzanine

This underground station has two tracks and two side platforms. Fixed platform barriers, which are intended to prevent commuters falling to the tracks, are positioned near the platform edges. The mosaic band and name tablets on both platforms are of exquisite cut porcelain with vivid pastel shades of sky blue, cerulean blue, rose, yellow, maize and white, on a background of black, raspberry and greyed lavender. Hexagon "M" tablets run along the trim line at regular intervals. Blue stripes adorn the top and bottom of the tile band. Blue I-beam columns run along both platforms at regular intervals with alternating ones having the standard black name plate in white lettering.

The Manhattan-bound platform has an abandoned ramp leading to the street. This is where BMT Standard cars were fed directly into the subway back in the 1920s. Remnants can be seen from the front of the passing trains. Underneath the Canarsie-bound platform is a small stairway to the tracks, giving evidence of a platform extension.

=== Exits ===
This station has one mezzanine above the center of the platforms and tracks. Two staircases from each side go up to a waiting area/crossover, where a turnstile bank provides access to/from the station. Outside fare control, there is a token booth and two staircases going up to either western corners of Montrose and Bushwick Avenues.
