= MTA Arts & Design =

NYC region transit art program

Official logo

MTA Arts & Design, formerly known as Metropolitan Transportation Authority Arts for Transit and Arts for Transit and Urban Design, is a commissioned art program directed by the Metropolitan Transportation Authority for the transportation systems serving New York City and the surrounding region. Since 1985, the program has installed art in more than 260 transit stations. The art is intended to be site-specific and to improve the journey for New Yorkers and visitors alike.

MTA Arts & Design has works commissioned by over 300 artists, with entries in graphic art, photography installations, digital art, Music Under New York, Poetry in Motion, and special events.

== History ==
When the first line of what is now the New York City Subway opened in 1904, its founders declared that the railway was a "great public work" where every design element should show respect for customers and improve the experience of travel through beauty and efficiency. MTA Arts & Design was created in 1985 when the MTA began to reverse years of decline by rehabilitating and renewing the transit system.

The commissioning of original artwork was intended to show riders that the system values their comfort and experience within stations. Works use durable materials like ceramic tile and mosaic, bronze, stainless steel, glass and light. MTA Arts & Design also plays an important role in design elements and architecture within passenger stations as well as industrial design elements and subway car design.

== Process ==
The Percent for Art projects link people to places with art that echoes the architectural or cultural history, urban design and community context of stations. The identity of New York City and its subway system is connected to the permanent artwork in the stations. The collection of work serves as the city's underground art museum and represents its vitality, energy and diversity. Most of the art is site-specific.

Artists are chosen through a competitive process with selection panels composed of visual-arts professionals. They review artists’ previous work, choose finalists who produce site-specific proposals, and then reconvene to select artist proposals for the given project(s). Community representatives are invited to attend the meetings and provide input. Artist opportunities are posted on the A&D website and announced through social media and local arts organizations.

== Notable artists and work ==
Notable artists commissioned through the program include Xenobia Bailey, Romare Bearden, Vito Acconci, Priscila De Carvalho, Jacob Lawrence, Ellen Harvey, Sol LeWitt, Roy Lichtenstein, Jack Beal, Elizabeth Murray, Faith Ringgold, Duke Riley, Shinique Smith, Nancy Spero, Doug and Mike Starn and Tom Otterness' Life Underground.

The January 1, 2017, opening of the Second Avenue Subway Phase 1 stations (72nd Street, 86th Street, and 96th Street as well as new renovation of Lexington Avenue–63rd Street) added permanent installations by Vik Muniz, Chuck Close, Sarah Sze, and Jean Shin to the Arts & Design collection. Stations renovated as part of the Enhanced Station Initiative in 2017–2019 also received new or expanded artwork during their renovations.

As of 2015, more than 100 projects were underway, including Ann Hamilton's artwork for the new Cortlandt Street station. Another notable work, Sky Reflector-Net, was installed in 2014 in the then-new Fulton Center headhouse. It uses hundreds of aluminum mirrors to provide natural sunlight from a 53-foot skylight to an underground area as much as four stories deep. This is the first intentional skylight in the New York City Subway system since the 1945 closure of the original City Hall station.

MTA Arts & Design highlights

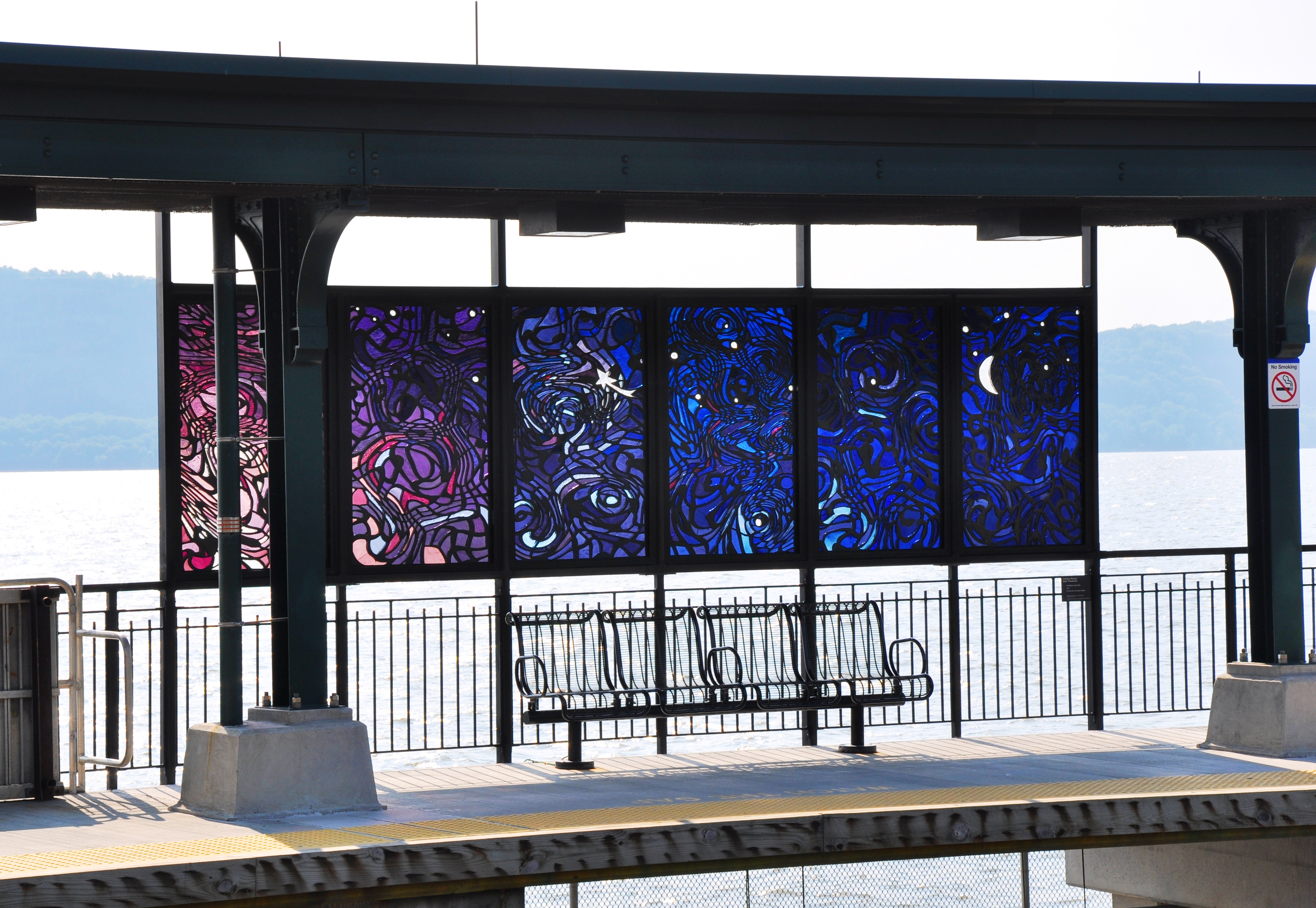
Untitled with Sky at Scarborough

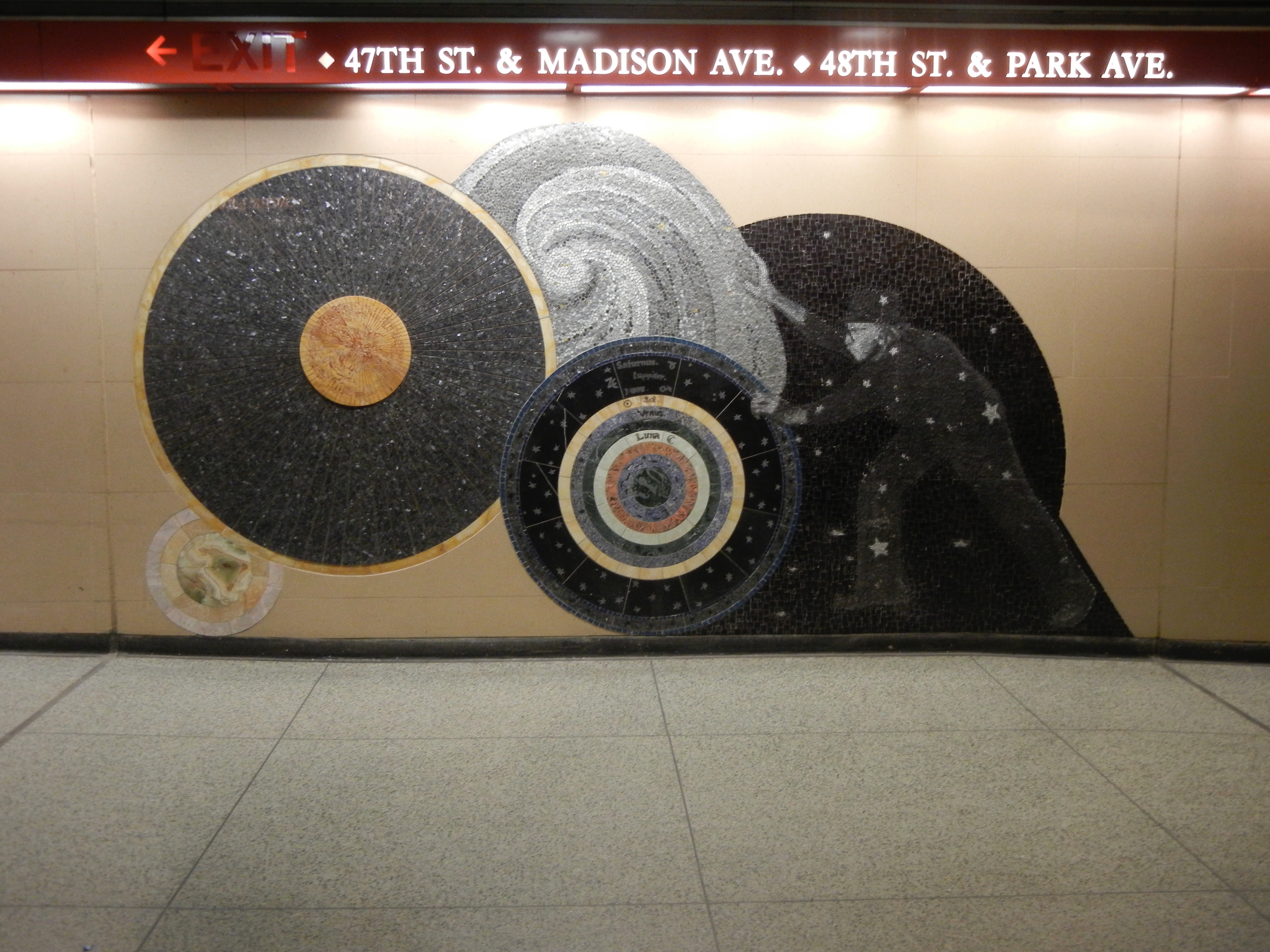
As Above, So Below at Grand Central Terminal

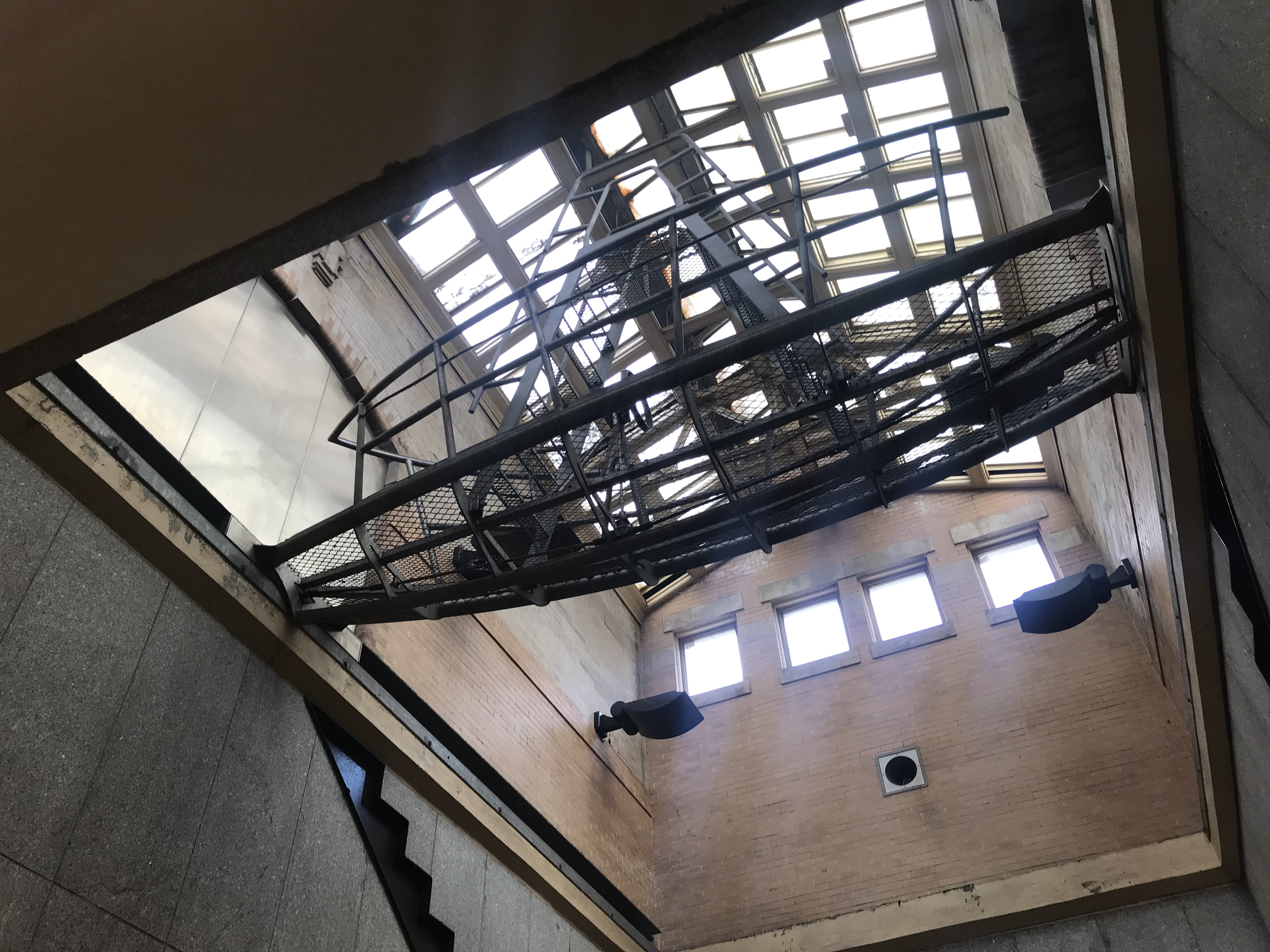
Hook, Line and Sinker at Atlantic Avenue
