= Shot Dog Film =

1977 short film by Tom Otterness

- Directed by: Tom Otterness
- Release date: 1977
- Country: United States

Shot Dog Film is a 1977 American avant-garde short documentary film created by Tom Otterness. The film depicts Otterness shooting and killing a dog, and it faced significant controversy.

== Content ==
The film consists solely of looped footage of Otterness's hand holding a pistol and shooting a small black and white dog chained to a stake.

== History ==
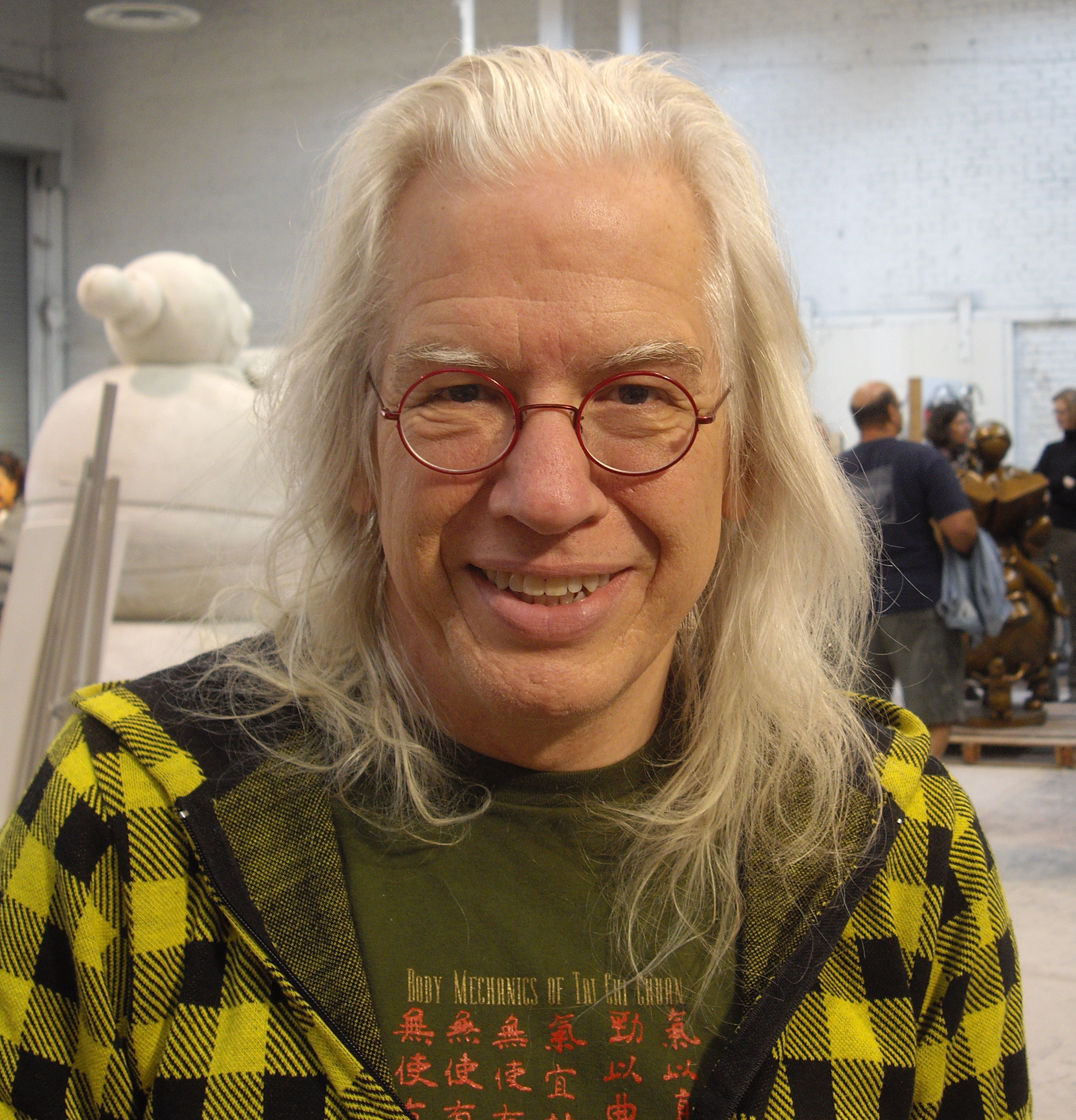
Tom Otterness, the creator of the film

In 1977, Tom Otterness, then a member of Colab, adopted a small dog from a shelter in Golden, Colorado. He filmed himself killing the dog and titled the resulting film Shot Dog Film before debuting it in a screening room in Times Square. He later aired it on Manhattan Cable Television on Christmas morning, 1979. Hundreds of people saw the film, and he was pursued by the Animal Protection Institute for a few months before the event was forgotten. Otterness became a successful sculptor and faced no legal repercussions for the film.

In 2004, art critic Gary Indiana mentioned the film in a review of one of Otterness's sculpture exhibitions, writing that Otterness killed a dog "for the fun of recording his infantile, sadistic depravity on film". Indiana bringing the film back into public consciousness caused animal rights activists to put additional pressure on Otterness. Otterness apologized for the film in 2007, saying that it was "an indefensible act" and that he was "deeply sorry". In 2011, he said that killing the dog was "the most damaging thing that I could do to the audience by showing a film".

In 2011, Battery Park City rejected a sculpture donated by Otterness because of the film. New York animal rights activists held a vigil for the shot dog in Rochester. That same year, San Francisco mayor Ed Lee cancelled a $750,000 contract with Otterness after local newspapers reported on the film. In 2014, New York artists Andrew Tider and Lisa Barnstone installed a guerilla sculpture in the style of Otterness's Life Underground depicting Otterness shooting a dog to mock him.

== See also ==
- Snuff film
