= 14th Street/Eighth Avenue station =

New York City Subway station in Manhattan

14 Street/8 Avenue
- New York City Subway station complex
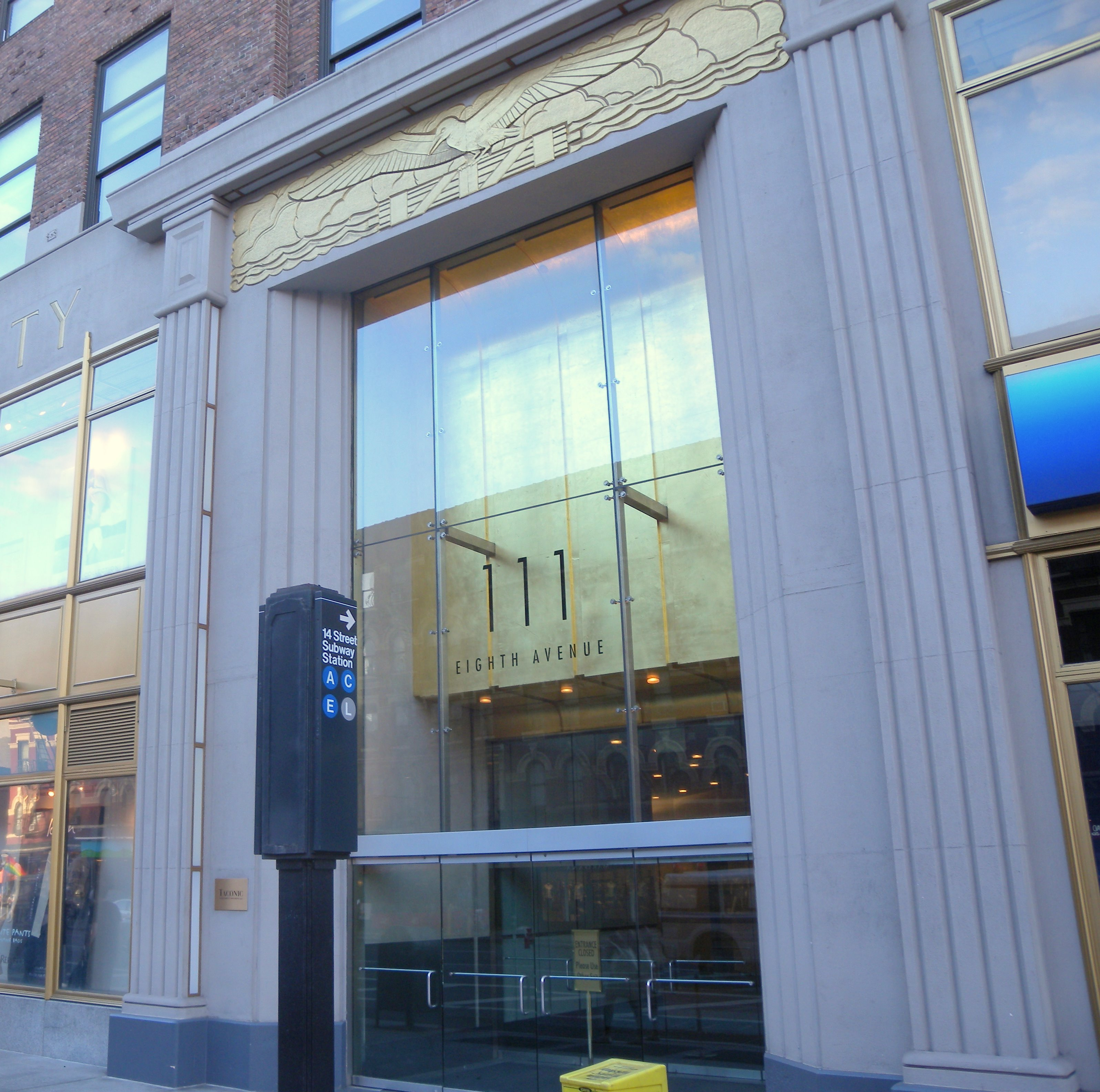
- Street entrance inside 111 Eighth Avenue

Station statistics
- Address: Eighth Avenue & West 14th Street; New York, New York
- Borough: Manhattan
- Locale: West Village, Chelsea
- Coordinates: 40.739779°N 74.002533°W
- Division: B (BMT/IND)
- Line: IND Eighth Avenue Line; BMT Canarsie Line
- Services: A (all times); C (all except late nights); E (all times); L (all times)
- Transit: NYCT Bus: M12, M14A SBS, M14D SBS, M20
- Structure: Underground
- Levels: 2

Other information
- Opened: September 10, 1932 (94 years ago)
- Accessible: Yes

Traffic
- 2025: 12,021,140 ▲3.2%
- Rank: 16 out of 423
Location
Location within New York City Subway
Location within New York City
Location within New York
Street map
Station service legend
Symbol	Description
Stops all times except late nights	Stops all times except late nights
Stops all times	Stops all times

The 14th Street/Eighth Avenue station is an underground New York City Subway station complex shared by the IND Eighth Avenue Line and the BMT Canarsie Line. Located at Eighth Avenue and 14th Street in Manhattan, the station is served by the A, E, and L trains at all times and the C train at all times except late nights.

The whole complex is ADA-compliant, with an accessible station entrance at 14th Street. This complex was renovated at the beginning of the 21st century. There are several MTA New York City Transit Authority training facilities located in the mezzanine. The station complex contains an artwork by Tom Otterness called Life Underground, which features whimsical bronze sculptures, including a sewer alligator, scattered about the station.

== History ==
=== Construction and opening ===
The Dual Contracts, which called for the expansion of the New York City Subway system, were formalized in early 1913. As part of the Dual Contracts, the Brooklyn Rapid Transit Company (later the Brooklyn–Manhattan Transit Corporation, or BMT) was to construct a subway from 14th Street in Manhattan to Canarsie in Brooklyn; this became the BMT's Canarsie Line. Booth and Flinn was awarded the contract to construct the line on January 13, 1916. Clifford Milburn Holland served as the engineer-in-charge during the construction. The line opened in phases, reaching Sixth Avenue in 1924.

Meanwhile, New York City mayor John Francis Hylan's original plans for the Independent Subway System (IND), proposed in 1922, included building over 100 miles (160 km) of new lines and taking over nearly 100 miles (160 km) of existing lines. The lines were designed to compete with the existing underground, surface, and elevated lines operated by the Interborough Rapid Transit Company (IRT) and BMT. On December 9, 1924, the New York City Board of Transportation (BOT) gave preliminary approval for the construction of the IND Eighth Avenue Line. This line consisted of a corridor connecting Inwood, Manhattan, to Downtown Brooklyn, running largely under Eighth Avenue but also paralleling Greenwich Avenue and Sixth Avenue in Lower Manhattan. The BOT announced a list of stations on the new line in February 1928, with an express station at 14th Street.

==== BMT station ====
In the years after the Canarsie Line opened, it saw extremely high ridership, prompting the Central Mercantile Association and the 14th Street Association to request that the line be extended west to Eighth Avenue. In July 1927, New York City comptroller Charles W. Berry proposed extending the Canarsie Line to Eighth Avenue, and adding a transfer to the proposed IND station there, as part of a 16-point plan to reduce congestion in the New York City Subway system. Members of the 14th Street Association even proposed extending the line further west, under the Hudson River to New Jersey.

The Transit Commission notified the BMT in March 1928 that it had approved the extension of the Canarsie Line two blocks under 14th Street, from Sixth to Eighth Avenue; this would allow the line to connect with the new IND subway. By July 1928, the BOT was planning to award contracts for a two-block extension of the Canarsie Line. The same month, D. C. Serber submitted a low bid of $3.16 million. The extension was the final portion of the Canarsie Line that the BMT was required to build as part of the Dual Contracts. The BOT hoped that the extension would help relieve congestion at the Canal Street station in lower Manhattan. After the New York City Board of Estimate approved the extension in August 1928, local civic group 14th Street Merchants' Association wrote a letter to mayor Jimmy Walker, expressing its support for the extension. That September, the BOT awarded a $3.15 million contract for the construction of the extension.

During the extension's construction, in November 1929, a section of temporary sidewalk collapsed into an excavation for the subway tunnel, injuring four people. The BOT began soliciting bids for the station's finishes in June 1930. Construction was halted temporarily the same month when D. C. Serber, the contractor in charge of building the extension, found itself unable to pay a salary to 300 workers. D. C. Serber filed for bankruptcy in October 1930, and a receiver was appointed to complete the project. The Eighth Avenue station of the Canarsie Line opened on May 30, 1931, and was the last station to open on the line. Local civic groups believed the opening of the Canarsie Line extension would lead to increased business on 14th Street, which already carried more passengers than other major crosstown corridors in Manhattan.

==== IND station ====
Most of the Eighth Avenue Line was dug using a cheap cut-and-cover method. At the 14th Street station, the Eighth Avenue Line passed above the under-construction Canarsie Line, and the Eighth Avenue Line station was designed to permit a possible future extension of the Canarsie Line. The finishes at the four stations between 14th and 42nd Street were 21 percent completed by May 1930. By that August, the BOT reported that the Eighth Avenue Line was nearly completed and that the four stations from 14th to 42nd Street were 99.8 percent completed. The entire line was completed by September 1931, except for the installation of turnstiles.

A preview event for the new subway was hosted on September 8, 1932, two days before the official opening. The 14th Street station opened on September 10, 1932, as part of the city-operated IND's initial segment, the Eighth Avenue Line between Chambers Street and 207th Street. There was a direct connection with the BMT station at 14th Street and Eighth Avenue. The 14th Street station was the only stop on the Eighth Avenue Line that provided a free transfer to another subway line, the Canarsie Line, from the outset. The New York Herald Tribune described the 14th Street station as one of three "showplaces" on the new IND line, the others being the 59th Street and 42nd Street stations.

The construction of the Eighth Avenue Line caused real-estate values along Eighth Avenue to increase by as much as 400 percent. The IND and BMT station at the intersection of Eighth Avenue and 14th Street, in particular, had spurred the growth of business around that intersection, including the construction of a building for the New York County Trust Company on the northeastern corner. Companies and agencies such as the New York Central Railroad and the Port of New York Authority were relocating to the area, which according to the New York Herald Tribune had previously been an area "of a mixed residential and business character and of ancient and obsolete structural condition".

=== Later years ===
==== 1990s renovation ====
In April 1993, the New York State Legislature agreed to give the Metropolitan Transportation Authority (MTA) $9.6 billion for capital improvements. Some of the funds would be used to renovate nearly one hundred New York City Subway stations, including both stations in the 14th Street/Eighth Avenue complex. On August 24, 1993, the contract for the project's design was awarded for $994,079. In May 1994, a supplemental agreement worth $203,435 was reached to allow the consultant to design the New York City Transit training facility to be compliant with the Americans with Disabilities Act of 1990. As part of the project's design, multiple options were considered to improve the station, including the construction of a free transfer zone between the Eighth Avenue and Canarsie Lines. As part of the supplemental agreement, the consultant, Day and Zimmermann International Inc., was directed to design it.

Citing security concerns, the MTA proposed closing an entrance at 15th Street as part of the renovation, but this prompted complaints from local residents. For the same reason, the MTA closed two staircases at Eighth Avenue and 17th Street in 1995. To compensate for the removal of the 17th Street staircases, the MTA proposed adding three stairways at Eighth Avenue and 16th Street. The original plans called for two staircases at the northeast corner of the intersection, but the MTA decided to add only one staircase there after receiving objections from the owners of a building at that corner. Community members also advocated for the closure of an exit-only staircase at Eighth Avenue and 15th Street, citing concerns about crime and drug use.

The project was originally supposed to cost $34.3 million and be completed by June 1998. By 1999, the project was running two years behind schedule. A reporter for the New York Daily News wrote in June 1999: "The station recently featured hanging wires, closed passageways, a blasting jackhammer, areas blocked by plastic fencing and plywood walls." The MTA attributed the delays to the discovery of structural flaws and poor design work.

=== Service history ===
When the 14th Street station on the IND Eighth Avenue Line opened, the station was served by express (A) and local (AA) trains between Chambers and 207th Street. After the IND Concourse Line opened on July 1, 1933, the C express and CC local trains started serving the station, running via the Concourse Line, while the AA was discontinued. The E began using the local tracks on August 19, 1933, when the IND Queens Boulevard Line opened. IND service at the station was again modified in 1940, when AA service was resumed. During that time, the CC local train and the C express train ran only during rush hours. In 1985, the AA was relabeled the K; the K train was discontinued in 1988.

The Eighth Avenue station on the BMT Canarsie Line has served trains to Canarsie ever since the station's opening. Trains between Eighth Avenue and Canarsie were numbered 16 until the 1960s, when it became the LL; it was again relabeled in 1985 as the L. Starting on September 23, 1936, express trains ran from Eighth Avenue to Lefferts Boulevard in Queens. This service, numbered 17, was discontinued in 1956.

=== Incidents ===
On April 18, 2004, an L train collided with the bumper block after the operator suffered a possible seizure.

On September 20, 2020, a northbound A train derailed at the IND station when a homeless man clamped wooden planks onto the roadbed, causing the train to derail. Three passengers were injured.

== Station layout ==
The 14th Street/Eighth Avenue station consists of 14th Street, an express station on the Eighth Avenue Line, and Eighth Avenue, a terminal station on the Canarsie Line. The two stations are perpendicular to each other, with the Eighth Avenue Line above the Canarsie Line. The 14th Street station on the Eighth Avenue Line runs north–south and consists of a mezzanine and two island platforms. The Eighth Avenue station on the Canarsie Line runs west–east and consists of one island platform.

=== Artwork ===
The artwork in this station, Life Underground, was designed by Tom Otterness, and was installed in 2001. It features whimsical bronze sculptures, including a sewer alligator, scattered about the station. Otterness had originally been contracted to sculpt 20 bronze figures, which were to have been installed in 1998. During the late 1990s, some of the individual pieces were put on public display at Grand Army Plaza and in Battery Park City. Approximately 25 of the pieces were finally installed at the end of 2000, with the other 30 sculptures installed by 2003. The entire project took 10 years from commissioning to the final completion of the installation.

From 1989 to 1995, an artwork by Ross Lewis could be found in the station. It is called Parallel Motion, and it shows images of moving bodies in the mezzanine drawn by brushstrokes using Chinese calligraphy. It is now situated in the lobby of Public School 89 in Battery Park City.

=== Exits ===
The entrances of the station complex are located at the intersections of Eighth Avenue and 14th, 15th, and 16th Streets. The northernmost one has an unstaffed bank of turnstiles, two staircases going up to the northwest corner of 16th Street and Eighth Avenue, and one going up to each eastern side of the intersection. A passageway leads to the front entrance of 111 Eighth Avenue (the Port Authority of New York and New Jersey building now occupied by Google) at the southwest corner. A sign on the sidewalk outside the building indicates that an entrance to the station is available inside of the building. On either side, at the center of the mezzanine, a set of full-height turnstiles lead to staircases going up to either northern corner of 15th Street and Eighth Avenue.

The full-time fare control area is at the south end of the mezzanine. On the east side is the transfer passageway between the platforms containing a ramp, staircase, and elevator. A set of full-height turnstiles leads to a staircase going up to the northeast corner of 14th Street and 8th Avenue. The full-time turnstile bank has a token booth, two staircases to the southeast corner, two staircases to the southwest corner (outside the New York County National Bank Building), and one staircase and elevator to the northwest corner (outside the New York Savings Bank Building). There is a direct entrance/exit to the BMT platforms at one bank of turnstiles here. This area also provides access to a signal training school for New York City Transit employees.

There was a fourth set of entrances located at the intersection of Eighth Avenue and 17th Street which have since been closed.

== IND Eighth Avenue Line platforms ==
14 Street
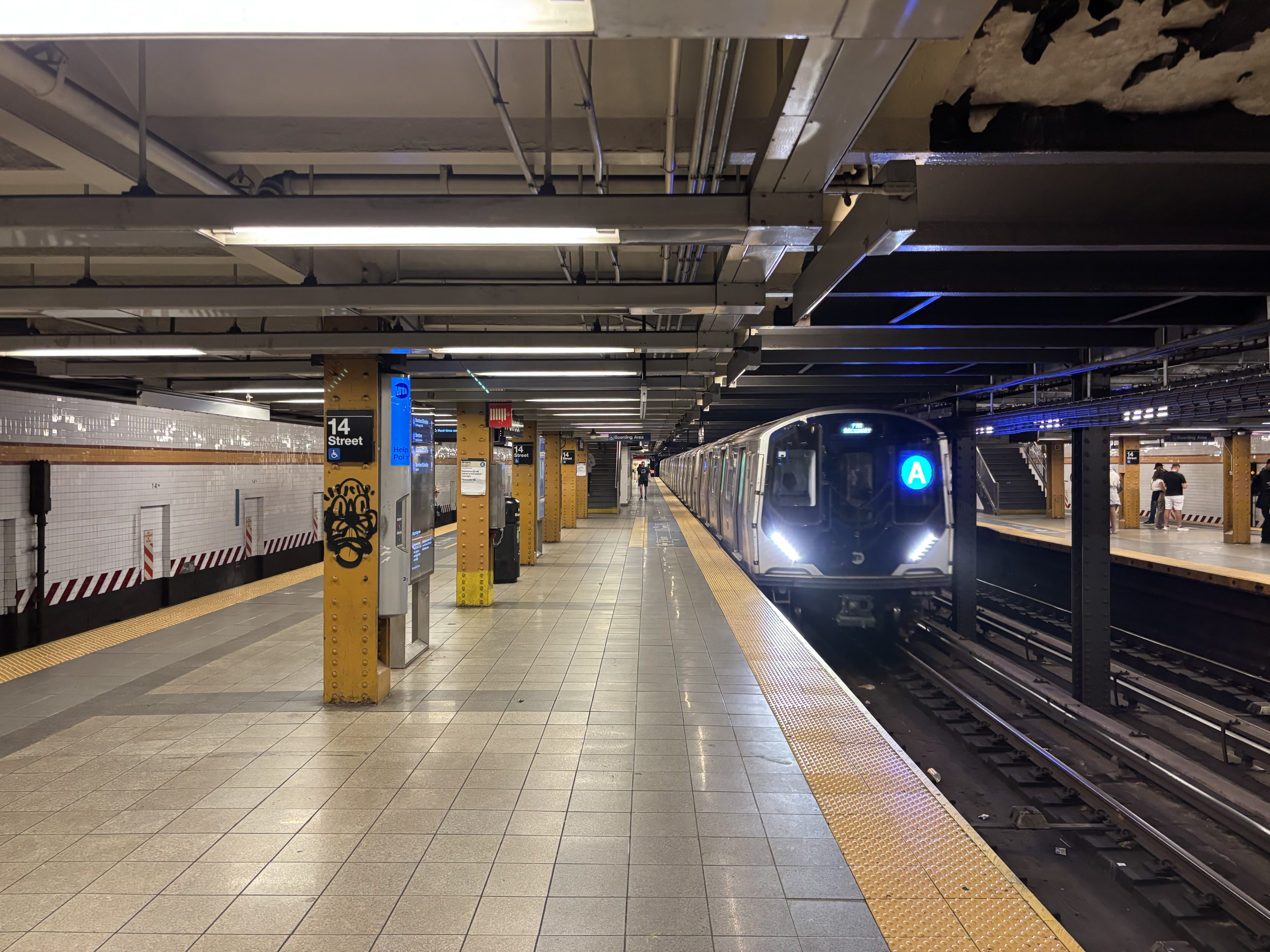
- R211A A train arriving at the southbound platform

Station statistics
- Division: B (IND)
- Line: IND Eighth Avenue Line
- Services: A (all times); C (all except late nights); E (all times)
- Platforms: 2 island platforms cross-platform interchange
- Tracks: 4

Other information
- Opened: September 10, 1932 (94 years ago)
- Accessible: Yes
Services
Preceding station	New York City Subway	Following station
34th Street–Penn Station A C toward Inwood–207th Street	Express	West Fourth Street–Washington Square A C E southbound
23rd Street A C E via 50th Street	Local	West Fourth Street–Washington Square A C E southbound
Track layout
Station service legend
Symbol	Description
Stops all times except late nights	Stops all times except late nights
Stops all times	Stops all times
Stops late nights only	Stops late nights only

The 14th Street station is an express station on the IND Eighth Avenue Line that has four tracks and two island platforms. The station is served by the A and E trains at all times, as well as the C train at all times except late nights. The C and E trains use the local tracks; the A train uses the express tracks during the daytime and the local tracks at night. It is the southernmost Eighth Avenue Line station that is under Eighth Avenue itself. South of here, the line curves east to Sixth Avenue via Greenwich Avenue.

The walls of the station contain yellow tile bands with darker yellow borders. Since 14th Street is an express station, it originally had a wider tile band than local stations. The tile colors are intended to help riders identify their station more easily, part of a color-coded tile system for the entire Independent Subway System. The tile colors were designed to facilitate navigation for travelers going away from Lower Manhattan; on the Eighth Avenue Line, the tiles change color at the next express station to the north. As such, the yellow tiles used at the 14th Street station were also used on 23rd Street, the local station to the north; the next express station, 34th Street–Penn Station, used a different tile color. "14th" is written in black on the white tiles below the trim line. The original 1931 trim line was a three-tile, high, deep yellow-orange set without a border.

Both platforms have yellow I-beam-columns running along the center of the platform. There are many staircases and one elevator per platform leading up to the full-length mezzanine above, which has a trim line, name tablets, and columns that are held in the same style as the platform below.

== BMT Canarsie Line platform ==
8 Avenue
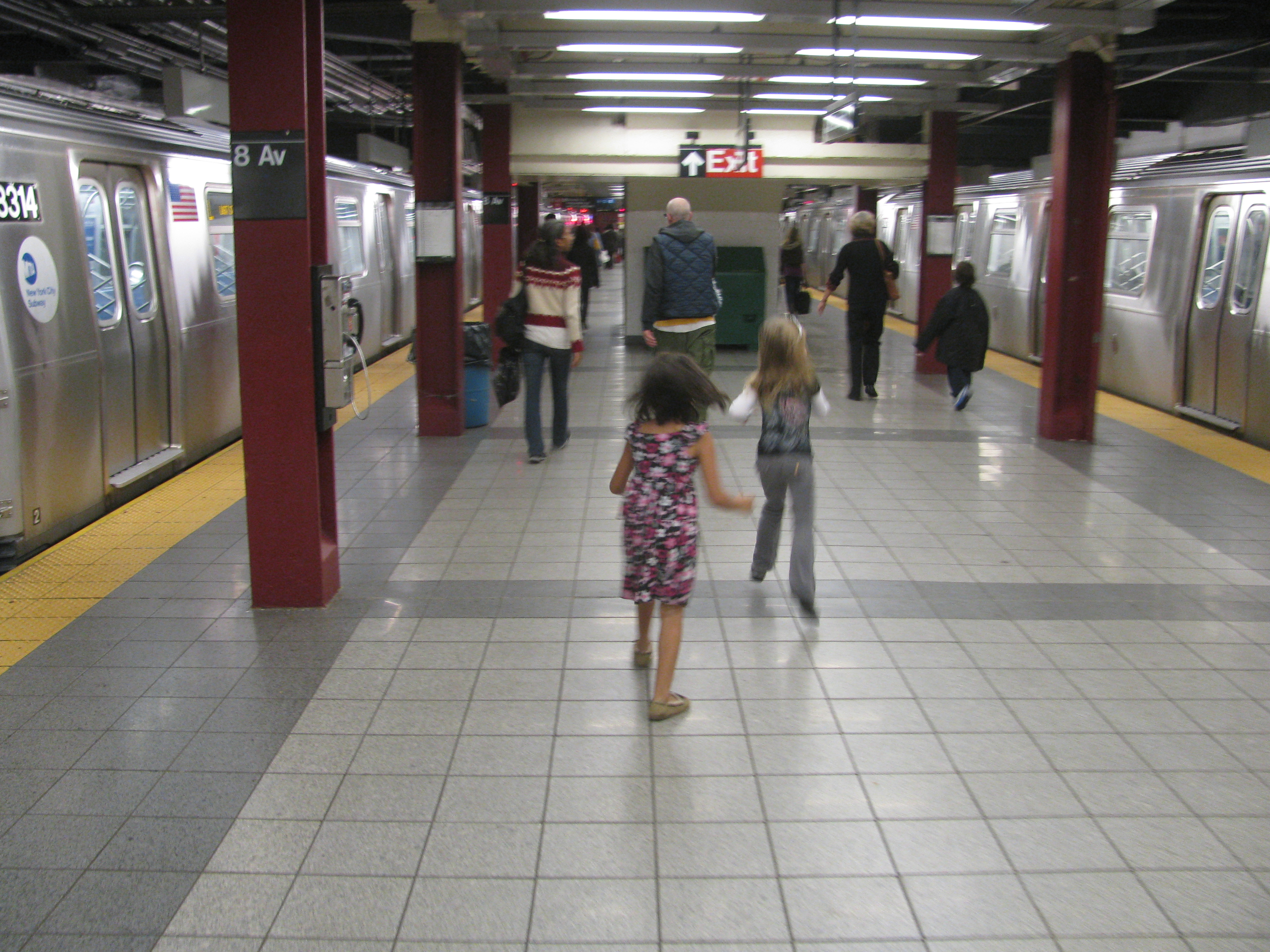

Station statistics
- Division: B (BMT)
- Line: BMT Canarsie Line
- Services: L (all times)
- Platforms: 1 island platform
- Tracks: 2

Other information
- Opened: May 30, 1931 (95 years ago)
- Accessible: Yes
Services
Preceding station	New York City Subway	Following station
Terminus	L (New York City Subway service)	Sixth Avenue toward Canarsie–Rockaway Parkway
Track layout
Station service legend
Symbol	Description
Stops all times	Stops all times

The Eighth Avenue station (displayed as Eighth Avenue–14th Street on NTT trains) is the western (railroad north) terminal of the BMT Canarsie Line and has two tracks and one island platform. The station is served by the L train at all times.

Eighth Avenue uses a single island platform with two tracks. The platform is approximately 545 feet (166 m) long and can fit nine 60-foot-long (18 m) cars. Fixed platform barriers, which are intended to prevent commuters falling to the tracks, are positioned near the platform edges. The tracks end at bumper blocks just past the west end of the platform. There are double crossovers east of the Eighth Avenue station, allowing terminating trains to access either track. Until automated train operation was implemented on the Canarsie Line in the 2010s, the switches were several hundred feet away from the end of the platform, and westbound trains were forced to enter the station extremely slowly.

The station was originally decorated in a more IND style than the rest of the Canarsie Line, which was built by the BMT. The original tile band was a two-tone ultramarine blue with "8th Av" captions. However, a 1999 renovation subsequently removed the IND style and replaced it with the BMT quilt-like tile pattern that exists on all other subway stations on the BMT Canarsie Line. The current tile color scheme is white with red stripes and mosaics held in beige and tan, with a pattern of red, yellow, green, and off-white in the center. To signify the station's location, there are small "8" decorations set in teal-green hexagons, as found in other stations on the line.

== Nearby points of interest ==
- Abingdon Square
- Chelsea art galleries west of 10th Avenue
- Chelsea Market
- Chelsea Piers Sports Complex
- The High Line
- Hudson River Park
- IAC Building
- Jackson Square Park
- Meatpacking District
- Saint Vincent's Hospital; fence nearby is covered with ceramic tiles in tribute to the World Trade Center
- Westbeth Artists Community
- West Village
- Whitney Museum of American Art
