= The New World (sculpture) =

Sculpture in Los Angeles, California

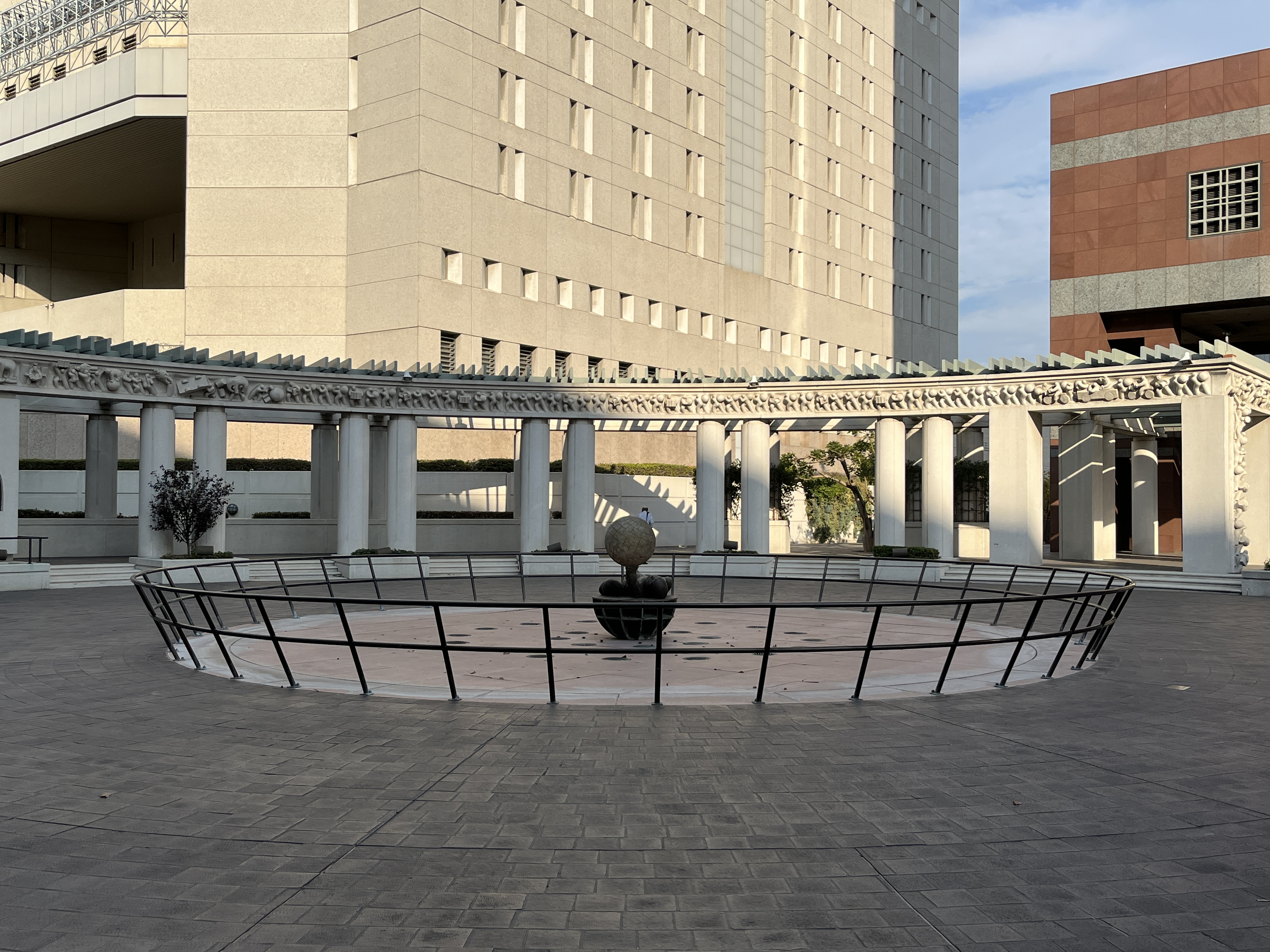
- Central fountain and frieze along the pergola, 2022
- Artist: Tom Otterness
- Location: Los Angeles, California, U.S.
- 34°03′12″N 118°14′21″W

The New World is a sculpture by Tom Otterness, installed outside Los Angeles' Edward R. Roybal Federal Building, in the U.S. state of California.

== Description ==
The work is installed in a central plaza in three parts. One fountain has a reclining bronze child and a bronze globe. A niche in a pillar has an abstract metal female figure on a chair. Her ankle is chained to the wall. An overhead cast concrete frieze runs along a pergola and down its columns. The frieze has abstract human figures carrying balls, boxes, and pillars. A human figure in the center of the frieze has multiple arms and holds a knife in one hand and a decapitated human head in another. A nearby human figure clings to the underside of a rhinoceros, and another depicts a human figure with an elephant.

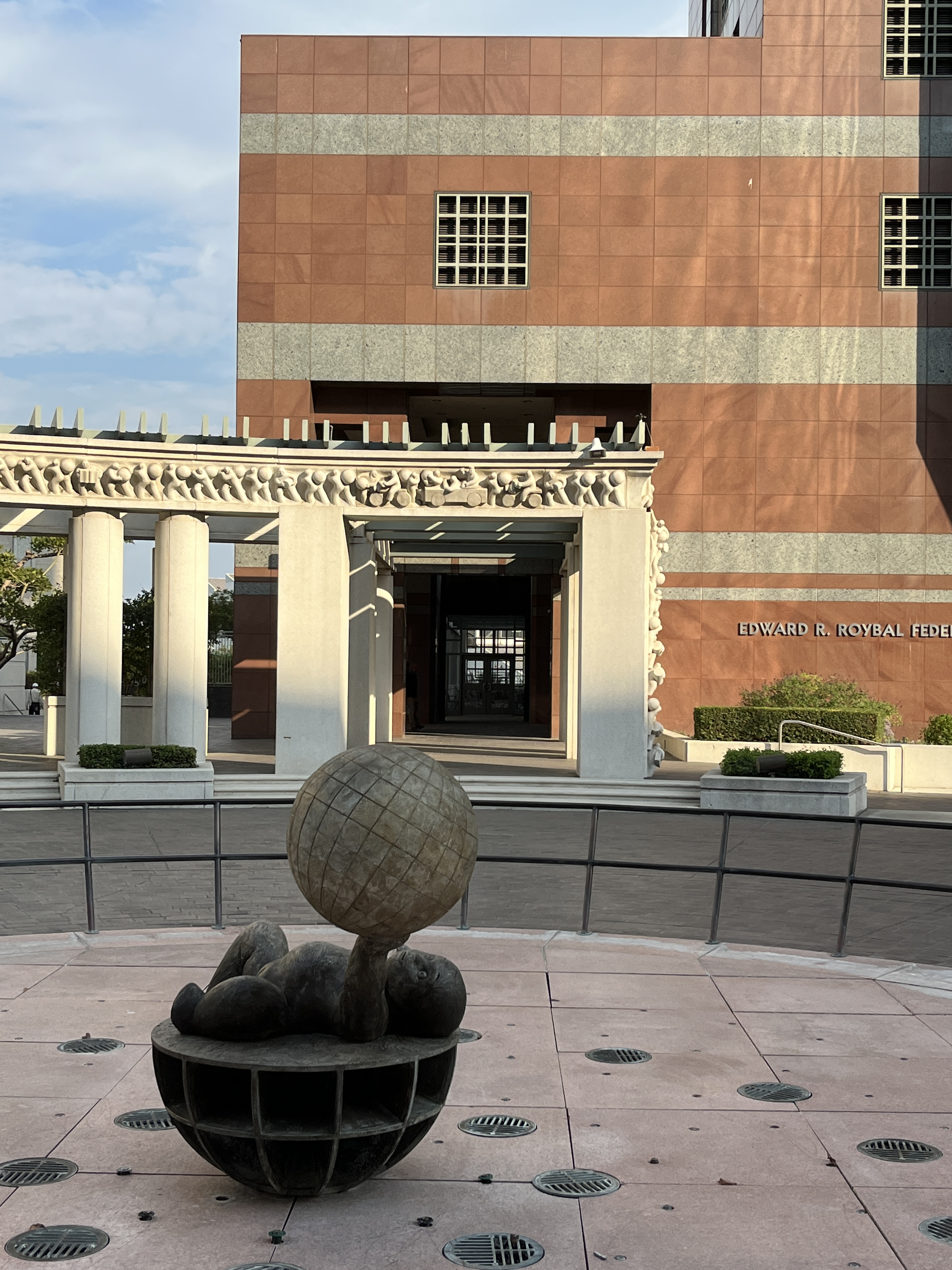
Central fountain

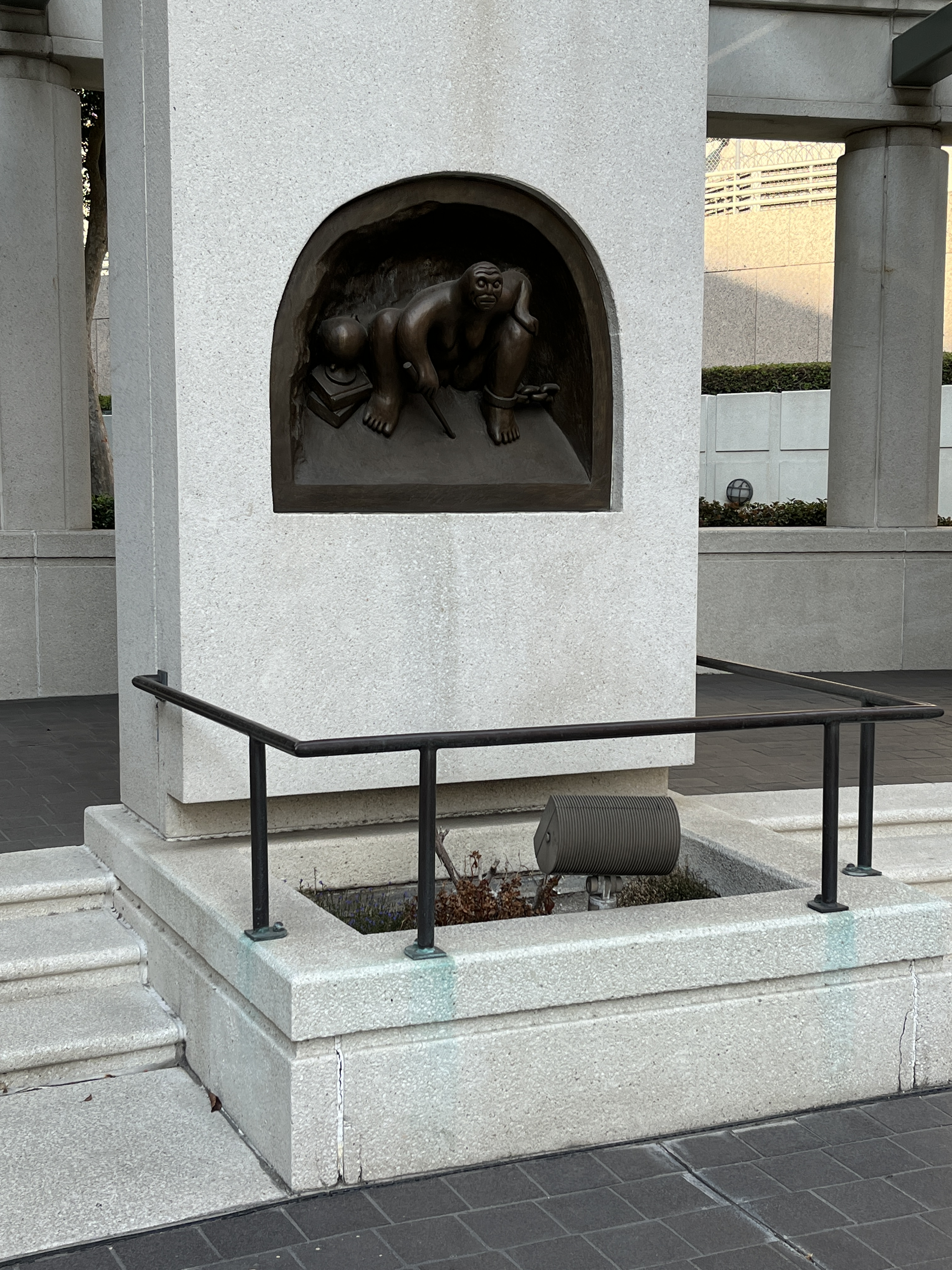
Niche

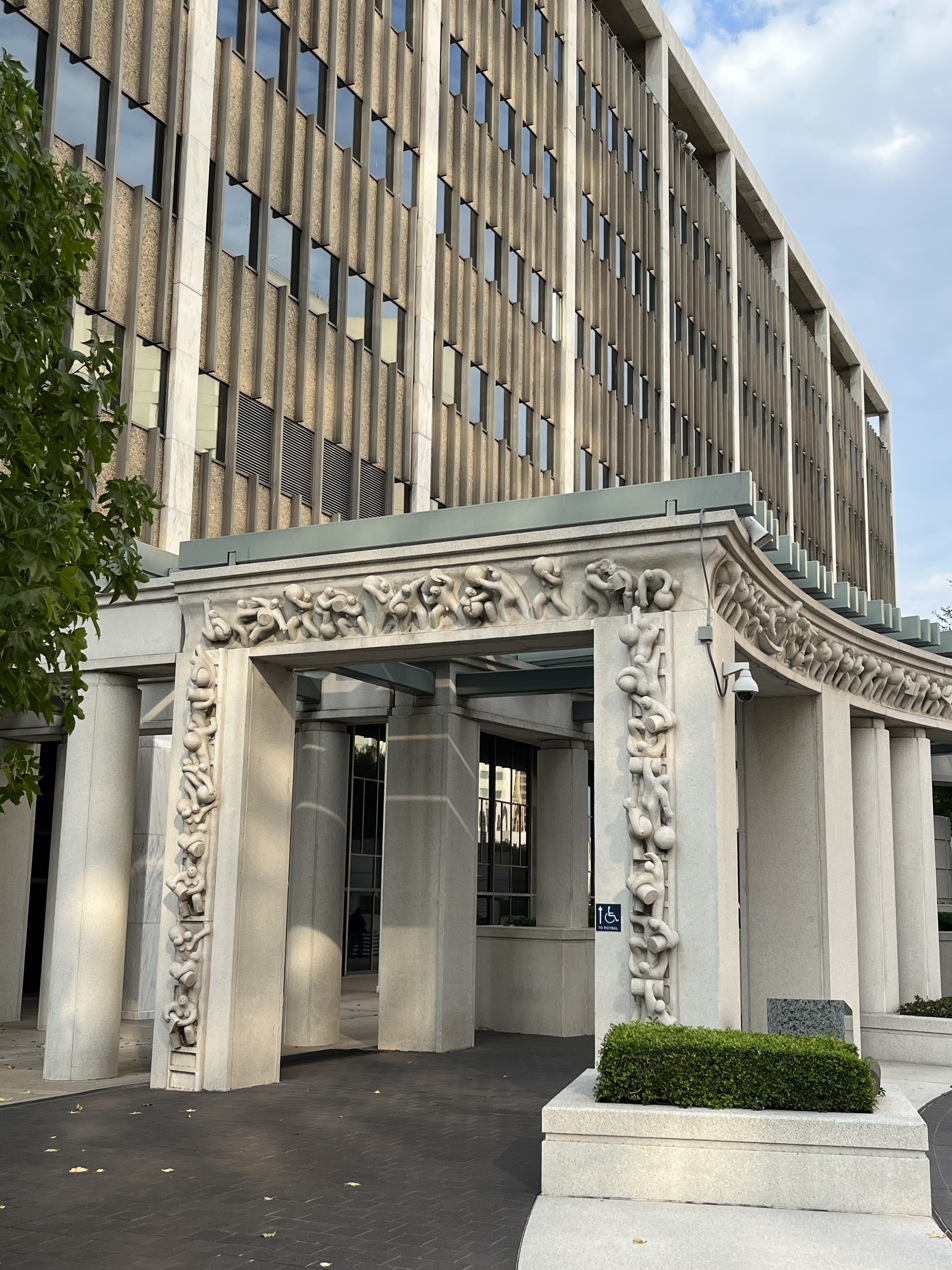
Frieze

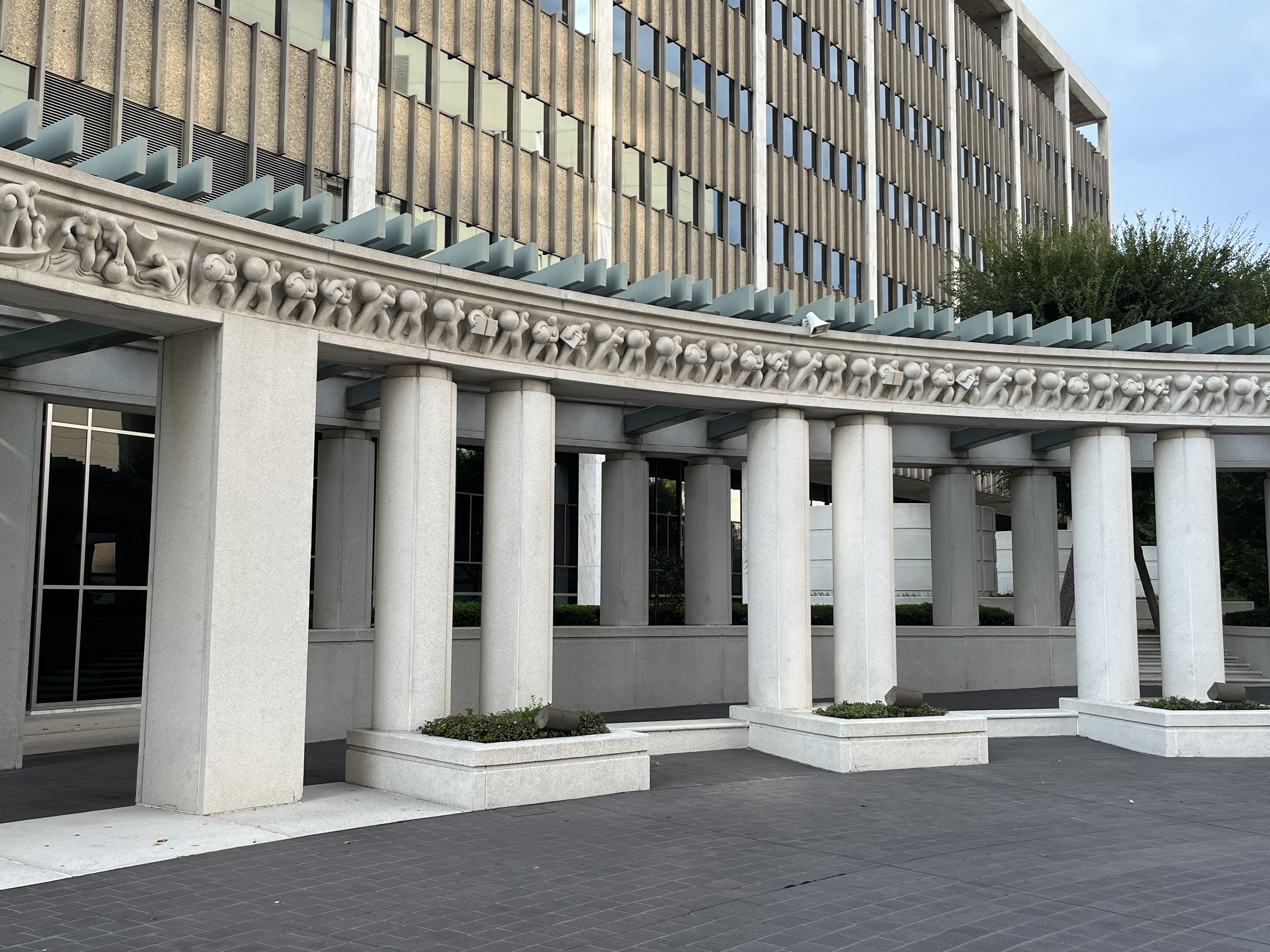
Frieze

== History ==
The abstract work was completed during 1982–1991 and installed in 1992. It cost $266,000. The artwork was surveyed as part of the Smithsonian Institution's "Save Outdoor Sculpture!" program in 1995.
