= Life Underground =

Sculptures by Tom Otterness

- Some of the Life Underground bronze sculpture elements, including the sewer alligator
- Artist: Tom Otterness
- Year: 2001
- Type: Bronze
- Dimensions: 30 cm (12 in)
- Location: 14th Street/Eighth Avenue New York City Subway station (A, C, E, and L trains), New York City

Life Underground (2001) is a permanent public artwork created by American sculptor Tom Otterness for the New York City Subway's 14th Street/Eighth Avenue station, which serves the A, C, E, and L trains. It was commissioned by the Metropolitan Transportation Authority's Arts for Transit program for US$200,000, one percent of the station's renovation budget. This program has commissioned permanent works of art for public transportation facilities the MTA owns and operates. This work is one of the most popular artworks in the subway system.

== Description and history ==
The installation is a series of whimsical miniature bronze sculptures depicting cartoon like characters showing people and animals in various situations, and additional abstract sculptures, which are dispersed throughout the station platforms and passageways. Otterness said the subject of the work is "the impossibility of understanding life in New York" and describes the arrangement of the individual pieces as being “scattered in little surprises.” Art critic Olympia Lambert wrote that "the lovable bronze characters installed there are joined together by a common theme of implied criminality mixed with an undercurrent of social anarchy," but labeled them as "too cute", saying that this "undercuts the work's more critical edge." Many of the figures have moneybag heads, and Otterness credits 19th century political cartoonist Thomas Nast's depiction of Boss Tweed and the corruption of Tammany Hall that was ongoing at the time of the subway's initial construction as his inspiration for these.

One of the larger pieces depicts a sewer alligator, as described by reporter Michael Rundle: "There is a bronze alligator on the Eighth Avenue and 14th Street subway platform, wearing a suit and tie. A 10-inch (250 mm)-high bronze man — also wearing a suit and tie — is struggling to escape his powerful jaws. Watching the scene, aside from throngs of L train riders, is another 10-inch (250 mm) figure. He stands beside his stricken friend, hands clasped behind his back, as if to say: 'I told you not to get so close'.” Otterness' sculpture has been praised for its appeal to all ages. The New York Times published a 2003 account describing the interaction of a 4-year-old boy with the sewer alligator. After jumping on the alligator's head and trying to wrestle the little man from his bronze jaws, the observer notes that the boy, "about to give up, he kicked the alligator, his foot connecting solidly with the bronze head. Surprise spread across his face as he ran away, crying, 'Mom, it tried to bite me!'."

Otterness had originally been contracted to sculpt 20 bronze figures, which were to have been installed in 1998. Otterness became so obsessed with this project, that he delivered more than four times the amount of artwork he was originally commissioned to produce. His wife finally made him end expansion of the collection by imploring him to stop "giving away our daughter's whole inheritance". The complete series encompasses more than 100 individual pieces. Some of the individual pieces were put on public display in 1996 on the southeast corner of Central Park at Grand Army Plaza, and then in Battery Park City in Lower Manhattan in 1997, to get public reaction prior to its installation, which was originally scheduled for 1998. Approximately 25 of the pieces were finally installed at the end of 2000. with the balance installed in the following years. The entire project took 10 years from commissioning to the final completion of the installation.

== Partial list of item descriptions ==
A portly figure of a well dressed man sitting on a platform level bench holding a moneybag as a train passes through the station. The bronze surface is polished by the hands of passersby.

- an alligator coming out of a manhole cover, biting the behind of a person with a moneybag head
- a sleeping homeless person being watched over by a police officer
- a couple walking arm in arm
- workers sweeping up subway tokens
- a couple of fare beaters sneaking under a barrier and a cop ready to catch them on the other side
- a little man with a big money bag sitting quietly on a bench perpetually waiting for a train
- workers carrying oversize versions of the tools used to build the subways
- people sweeping up piles of pennies
- colossal feet cut off flat at the ankles
- a totem-like sculpture whose human features are formed into the shape of a telephone
- a flummoxed woman standing with arms up in the air, holding onto her head which she has just popped off her neck
- two figures holding a crosscut saw, going after an I-beam
- little people sitting atop bulging bags of money
