= Tom Otterness =

American sculptor (born 1952)

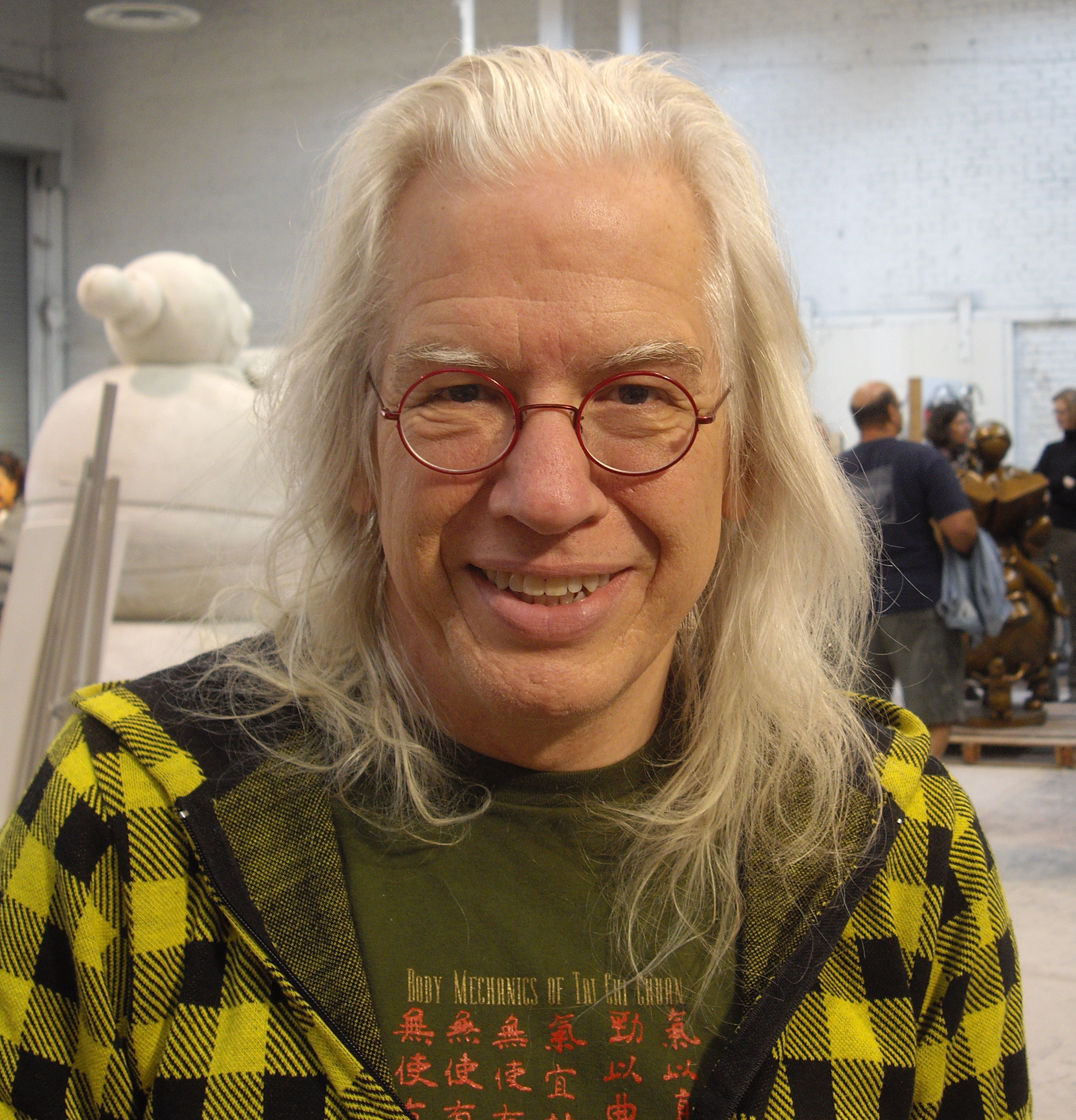
- Otterness in 2008
- Born: 1952 (age 73–74); Wichita, Kansas
- Known for: Sculpture, Prints and Drawing
- Movement: Colab
- Website: www.tomotterness.net

Tom Otterness (born 1952) is an American sculptor who is one of America's most prolific public artists. Otterness's works adorn parks, plazas, subway stations, libraries, courthouses and museums around the world, notably in Rockefeller Park in Battery Park City, New York City, and Life Underground in the 14th Street–Eighth Avenue station of the New York City Subway. He contributed a balloon (a giant upside-down Humpty Dumpty) to the Macy's Thanksgiving Day Parade. In 1994 he was elected as a member of the National Academy Museum.

His style is often described as cartoonish and cheerful, but also political. His sculptures allude to sex, class, money and race. These sculptures depict, among other things, huge pennies, pudgy characters in business suits with moneybag heads, helmeted workers holding giant tools, and an alligator crawling out from under a sewer cover. His aesthetic can be seen as a riff on capitalist realism.

Known primarily as a public artist, Otterness has exhibited across the United States and internationally, including New York City, Indianapolis, Beverly Hills, The Hague, Munich, Paris, Valencia and Venice. His studio is located on Ludlow Street in New York City.

== Career ==
Otterness studied at the Art Students League of New York in 1970 and at the Independent Study Program of the Whitney Museum of American Art in 1973. He was an active member of the artists' group Colab (Collaborative Projects) from its inception in 1977, and was involved in punk visual art, notably exhibiting in the Punk Art Exhibition in Washington DC, 1978.

=== Public artworks ===
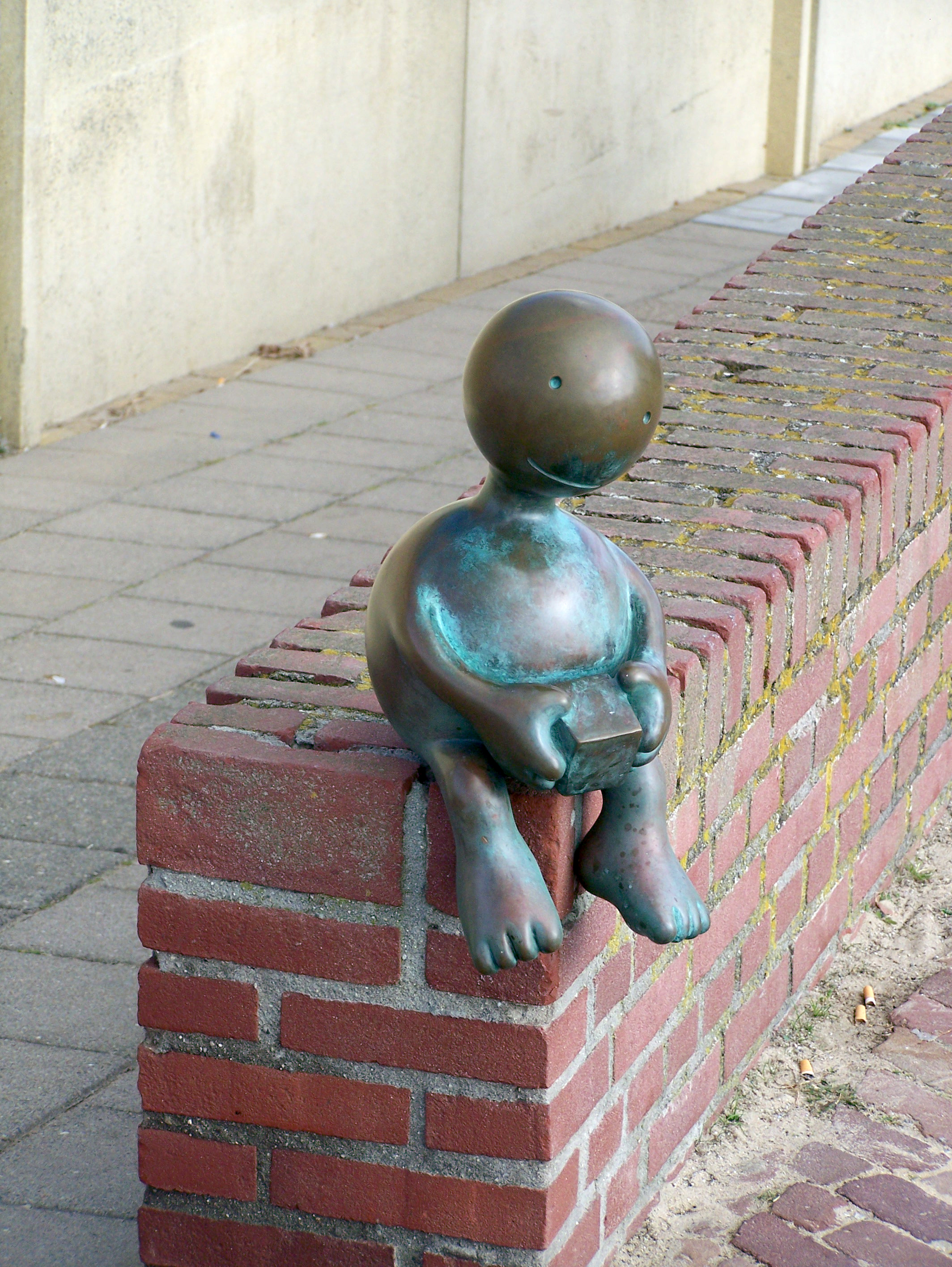
A sculpture in the Beelden aan Zee Museum, The Hague

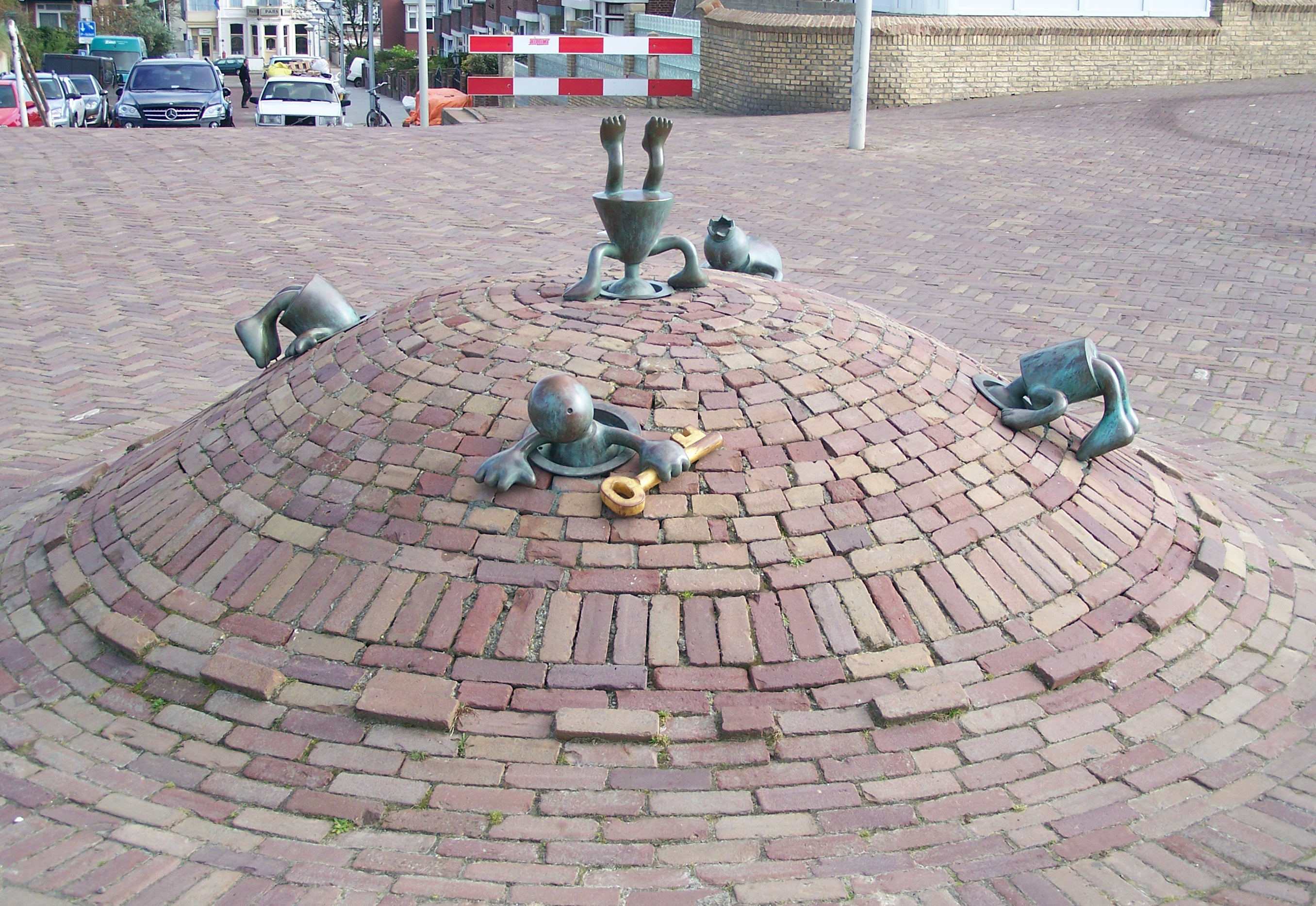
Another view of the same sculpture

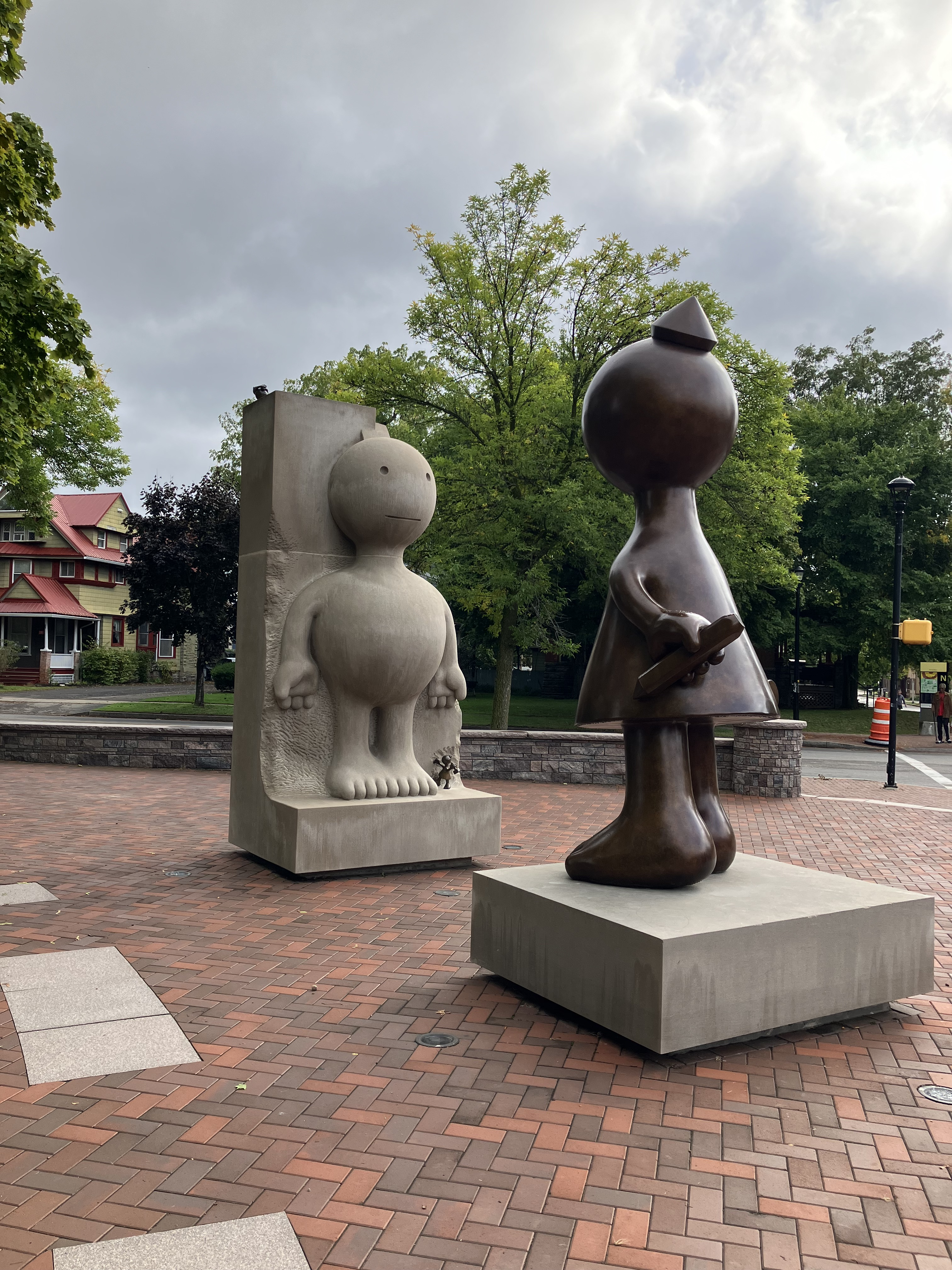
Creation Myth at the Memorial Art Gallery, Rochester, NY

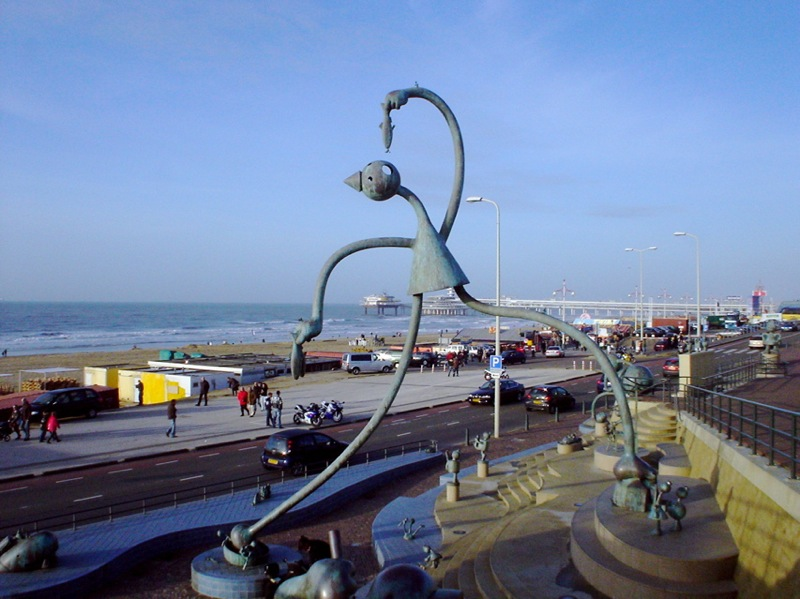
Herring Eater, The Netherlands

Otterness began his career as a public art sculptor during his period with Colab and The Real Estate Show. He sold small, plaster figures for $4.99 at Artists Space in New York for the 1979 holiday season. His inspiration was the plaster replicas of Jesus and Elvis and Santería sculptures in botanica shops in the Bronx. "I thought "Oh, this is public art… This is something that everyone can afford and take home." The next year he made a series of small plaster proto monuments for Colab's famous 1980 The Times Square Show, which he helped organize. This show featured inexpensive works by some 150 artists, including Kiki Smith, David Hammons and Jenny Holzer. He began showing with New York's Brooke Alexander Gallery soon after.

=== Early installations in New York City and around the U.S. ===
Many of Otterness's public works are found in New York City. The Real World, located in Battery Park City, was commissioned in 1986 and installed in 1992. The sculpture ensemble is meant to represent the world outside the playground, "a broad social allegory on art and life, where the games of power and control are played out in miniature … an imaginative park with things to touch and stories to invent."

A familiar installation to New Yorkers is 2000's Life Underground, located in the 14th Street–Eighth Avenue station of the New York City Subway, served by the A, C, E, and L trains. The sculptural group consists of over 100 cast-bronze sculptures placed throughout platforms and stairways, and is one of the most popular public artworks in the subway system. It took over 10 years to complete, and includes figures of a woman toting a nearly life-size subway token under her arm; a well-dressed fare jumper crawling under a metal gate; a homeless woman being rousted by the police; and two figures holding a cross-cut saw to cut into an I-beam that holds up a stairway. The New York Times noted, "Mr. Otterness worked hard to find creative ways to place his sculpture, navigating around the rules of stations design."

There is also a smaller installation, titled The Marriage of Money and Real Estate (1996), in the East River off the west shore of Roosevelt Island.

One of Otterness's earliest public art works, The New World, was installed in 1991 for the Edward R. Roybal Federal Building in Los Angeles, California. Otterness subsequently received Federal Courthouse commissions in Portland, Oregon (Law of Nature, 1997), Sacramento, California (Gold Rush, 1999) and Minneapolis, Minnesota (Rock Man, 1999).

=== Exhibitions ===
In 1987, Otterness exhibited his work The Tables at the Museum of Modern Art Projects show. White-collar workers, blue-collar workers, cops, radicals, captains of industry were displayed on four bronze picnic tables in the MoMA sculpture garden. The show traveled to the IVAM Centre Julio Gonzalez in Valencia, Spain; Portikus/Senckenbergmuseum in Frankfurt am Main; and Haags Gemeentemuseum in The Hague.

From September 20, 2004, to March 18, 2005, Tom Otterness on Broadway, his largest exhibition to date featured 25 different works installed between Columbus Circle and 168th Street in Washington Heights, Manhattan. The project was sponsored by the City of New York Parks and Recreation Department, the Broadway Mall Association, and Marlborough Gallery, and traveled to three other cities—Indianapolis, Beverly Hills, and Grand Rapids, Michigan. The Grand Rapids exhibition featured more than 40 works across two miles of the city's downtown area and at Frederik Meijer Gardens & Sculpture Park.

==== 21st Century installations ====
Otterness's later installations increasingly responded to and interacted with their physical and natural sites and environments. His 1999 Feats of Strength is a collection of his iconic whimsical bronze figures representing faculty and students interacting with pieces of the natural sandstone at Western Washington University. His 2004 Fairy-Tale Sculptures, installed at the Beelden aan Zee museum along the beachfront in The Hague, reference various fairytales such as Hansel and Gretel and Jonah and the whale and mix playful shapes with scenes of peril. The museum notes that children are encouraged to touch, climb, and interact with the sculptures.

In a more urban setting (Claremont, California), Otterness's 2007 Matriculated Nature is embedded in the tiers of a public plaza fountain. Notably, it is one of his most intentionally thematic public artworks; Otterness's bronze figures are a series of vignettes to illustrate "the progression and evolution of knowledge and education, from early literacy to higher education," as they advance up the tiers of a fountain specially designed for the installation by architect Peter Tolkin.

== Films and controversy ==
Otterness's work with Colab in independent punk art comprised a number of short films; on Colab's All Color News, these included Rats in Chinatown, filming rats at a Chinese deli, and Golden Gloves boxing at Madison Square Garden (with John Ahearn), filming an amateur boxing match.

His independent punk films featured real-life aggression and violence, most notoriously Shot Dog Film, wherein he adopted a dog from an animal shelter in Golden, Colorado, chained it to a stake, and filmed his hand shooting it dead. This was followed by four fight films, where Otterness, an amateur boxer, filmed his own Golden Gloves fights. Shot Dog Film premiered at a Times Square screening room in early 1978, the film being shown in a loop, and viewers were flash-photographed when they left. The film was the only entry that was not accepted in the Punk Art Catalog, due to its offensive nature. Otterness described it as follows:

The Dog Shot film … [is] about fucking someone... getting fucked by someone. That's what the fight films are about too. Running over someone; defeating someone; being defeated. They're the same thing those two films.

You said earlier that when you showed Dog Shot Film at the screening room at 42nd Street that you wanted to hurt the viewers.
Yeah, I mean that whole night on 42nd Street, as best as I could do it, was the most aggressive way I could think of to show a film, the most damaging thing that I could do to the audience by showing a film. I hired a photographer with a camera so when people were leaving the theater, they were assaulted by a flash, attacked.

Shot Dog Film was inserted by an unknown person into the repeating programming queue on Manhattan Cable TV instead of the normal cartoon programming for children. It was also shown on Christmas Eve or Christmas Day, 1978, and caused an instant outcry, leading to calls to prosecute Otterness. The film has continued to haunt Otterness, engendering continued controversy. Shot Dog Film was briefly mentioned as having "provoked a small scandal [in 1980]" in a 1997 New York Times article which dismissed it as "a seemingly uncharacteristic gesture that he has since declined to discuss." It was brought back into the public conscience in 2004 by journalist Gary Indiana, who criticized Otterness for the killing. Since then, Otterness has attracted criticism and protests for the 1977 film, apologized for his behavior, and lost a number of commissions from the continuing criticism. Otterness's studio released a statement blaming his "anger at [himself] and the world" for the film.

Thirty years ago when I was 25 years old, I made a film in which I shot a dog. It was an indefensible act that I am deeply sorry for. Many of us have experienced profound emotional turmoil and despair. Few have made the mistake I made. I hope people can find it in their hearts to forgive me.

— Tom Otterness, Brooklyn Daily Eagle, April 14, 2008

In New York City in June 2011, the Battery Park City Authority, under Bill Thompson, rejected Otterness's lion sculptures for the area's new public library, after the sculptures were approved by 5-1 by Manhattan Community Board 1 under Chairperson Julie Menin. The New York Public Library disavowed any involvement with the project, noting the donation of sculptures commissioned by a private donor had not been solicited by the NYPL. Following the Battery Park City Authority's rejections, in 2011, there was renewed controversy over the film, with animal rights groups protesting the selection of Otterness for a major sculpture project at the Memorial Art Gallery of the University of Rochester.

Also in 2011, the San Francisco Arts Commission terminated one of two contracts they had with Otterness. He had been awarded a $750,000 contract in September 2011 for a piece in the new Central Subway project; the San Francisco Municipal Transportation Agency stated they were unaware of Shot Dog Film when they awarded the contract. The mayor of San Francisco put the project on hold, calling the film "deeply disturbing." In October 2013, Lincoln, Nebraska Mayor Chris Beutler decided against purchasing a $500,000 train sculpture from Otterness for the city's West Haymarket development, after residents objected to Shot Dog Film. Citing the unity brought about by the city's development, the mayor said, "...the artist's past behavior in this instance has created a level of division in the community that is simply not acceptable. Our feeling is that it is in the best interest of the city to discontinue the contract process."

In September 2014, freelance artist Andrew Tider added three illegal sculptures to the "Life Underground" groupings in the subway station. They imitated the Otterness style, a blend of whimsy and biting commentary on corruption and greed, depicting a man pointing a gun at a dog, and a distant bystander.

== Personal life ==
Otterness has practiced tai chi, martial arts, and boxing since the mid-1960s. His studio has been photographed featuring a boxing bag. Some early boxing fights in the 1970s were filmed as part of his no wave punk art period, and he has won prizes for his tai chi in the school of William C. C. Chen. He lives with the American filmmaker Coleen Fitzgibbon on the Lower East Side in New York City and in Utica, Montana.
