= Creation Myth (sculpture) =

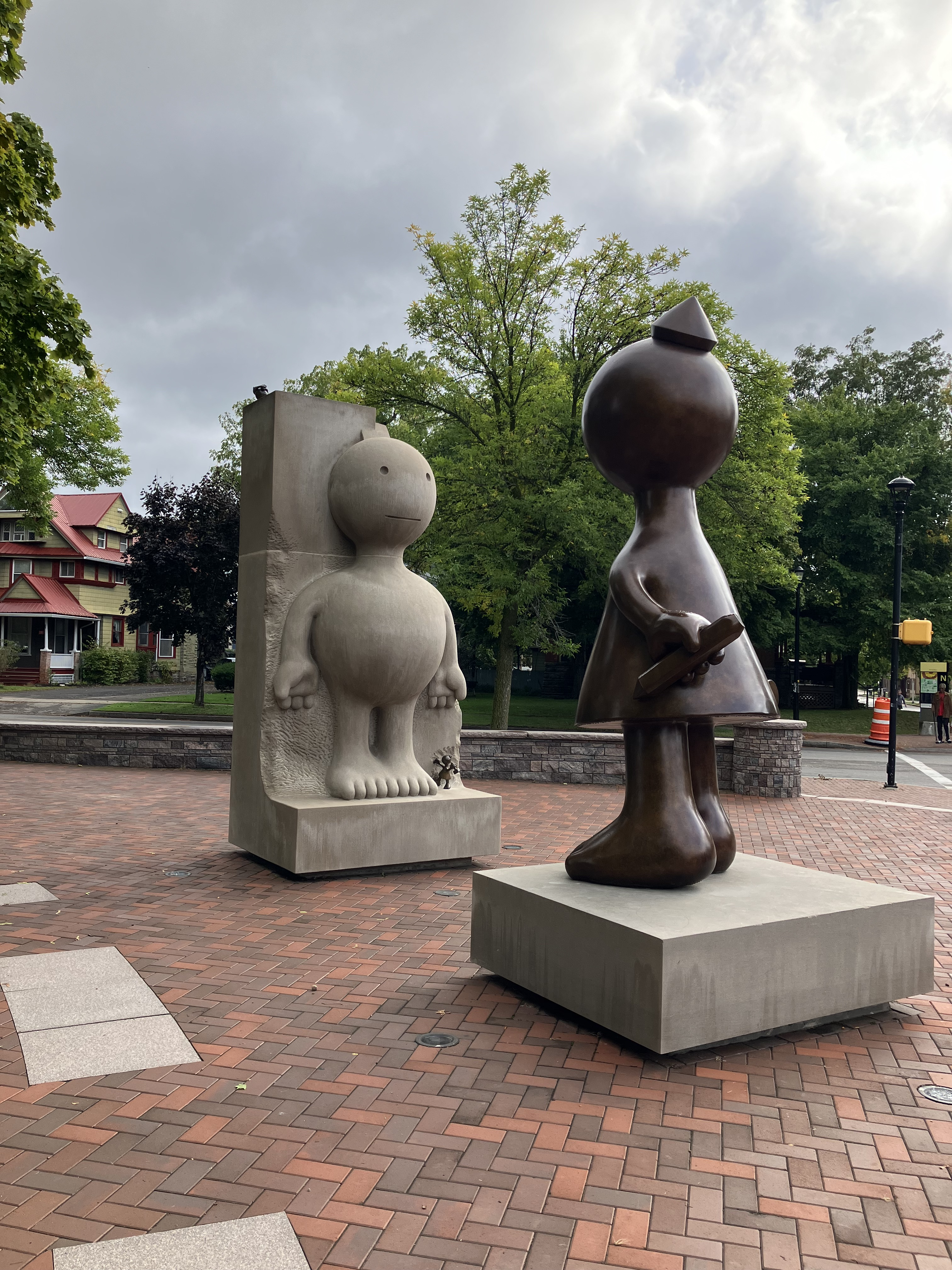
- Two of the largest sculptures in Creation Myth at the edge of the Centennial Sculpture Garden facing North Goodman Street
- Artist: Tom Otterness
- Year: 2011-12
- Medium: Sculpture, Limestone and bronze: Several pieces
- Location: Memorial Art Gallery, Rochester, New York

Creation Myth is a series of limestone and bronze sculptures created by Tom Otterness for the Memorial Art Gallery (MAG)'s Centennial Sculpture Park in 2012.

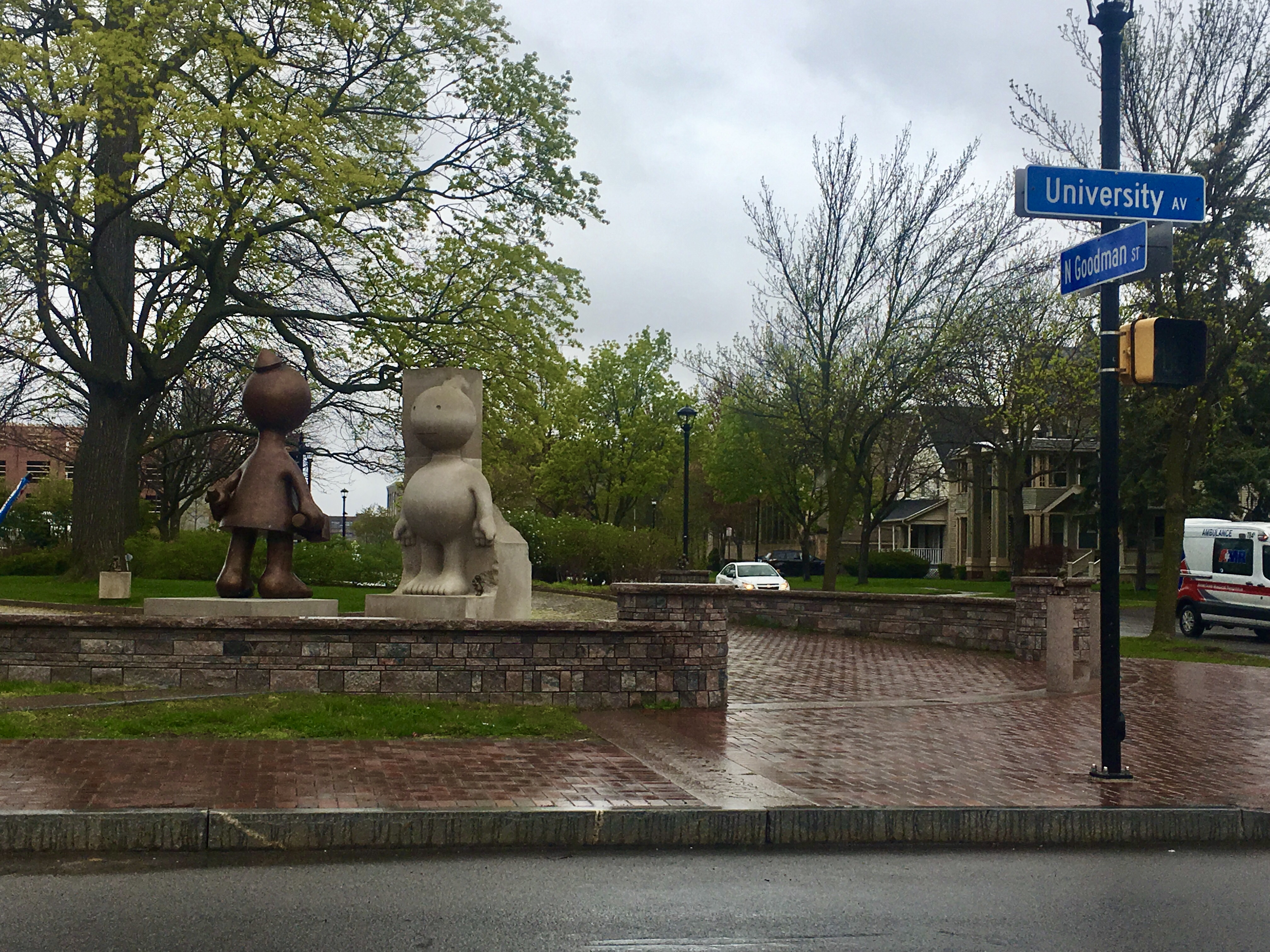
Part of Creation Myth visible at the corner of University Avenue and North Goodman Street, Rochester, NY

== Description ==
Creation Myth, a public sculpture series created in 2012, spans the rightmost block outside of Rochester's Memorial Art Gallery. The piece consists of cast bronze and carved limestone sculptures that range in size from less than half a foot tall to over six feet tall. There are individual forms in amounts going into the tens, making it hard to identify when exactly one sculpture ends and another starts, and thus how many specific sculptures there are in the series. They are, however, arranged into three general clusters, each using a large limestone sculpture as a focal point with smaller bronze sculptures positioned radially around it. Each sculpture depicts a relatively simplistic humanoid character, stylized similarly to the characters Otterness has used in many of his other public sculptures works like Tipping Point and The Public Unconscious. Their heads are composed of perfect spheres with non-angular, bendable-looking limbs protruding from the torso, represented by different geometric forms between statues including cones, spheres, and cubes.

== Symbolism and theme ==
Selected from a group of fifty artists to create a piece for the MAG's sculpture garden, Tom Otterness conceptualized the sculpture series Creation Myth as a parody of the Pygmalion myth. Though the initial story tells of a man who carves a woman out of ivory and brings her to life with a kiss, Otterness' recreation challenges the idea of those gender roles by implying that the sculptor is the woman through the use of the basic shapes society associates with the binary genders. Otterness further exemplifies this female-empowering series by alluding to Rochester native, Susan B. Anthony, and her contributions to the anti-slavery and suffragette movement.

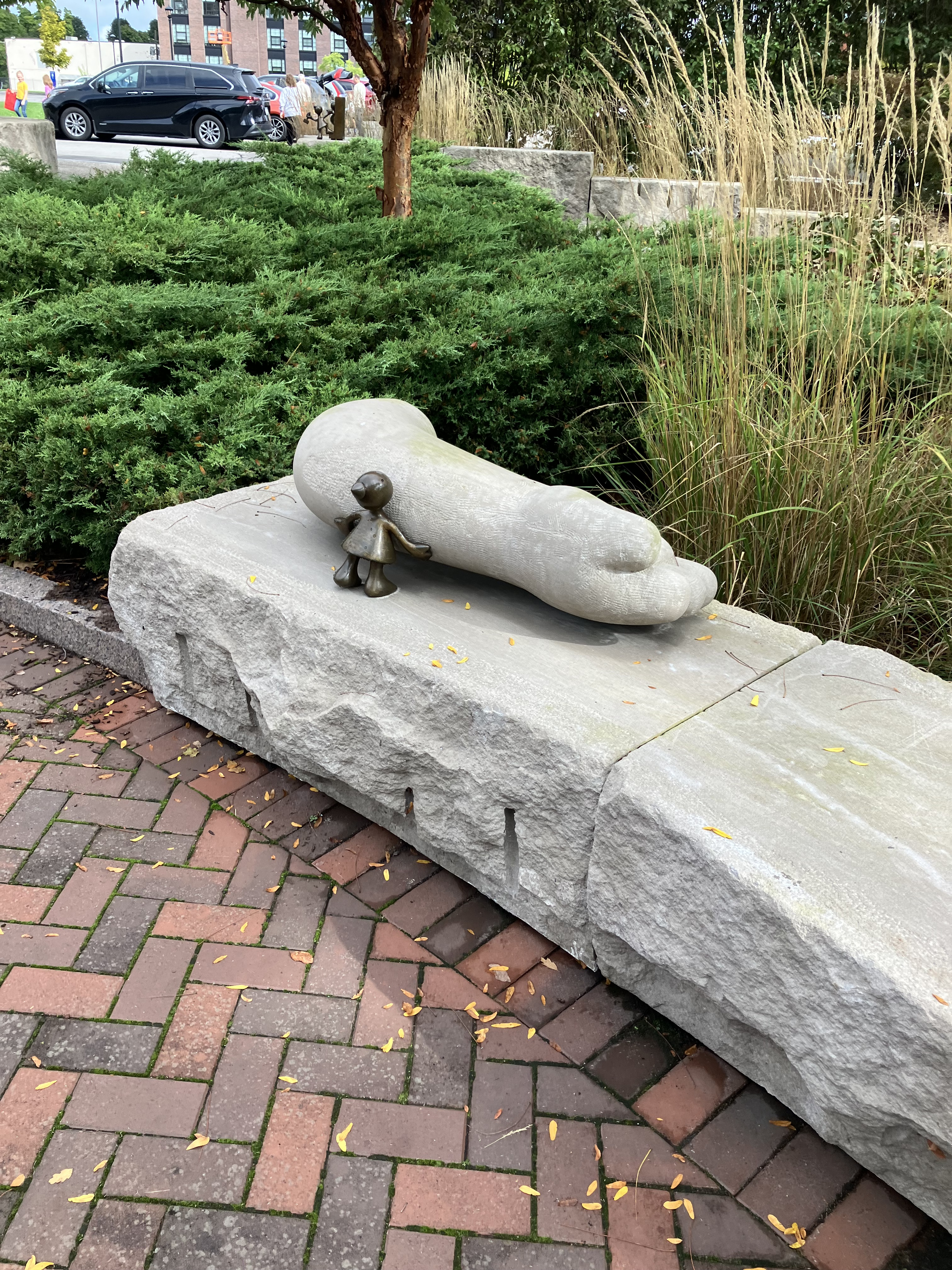
A small bronze figure hoisting up a large, disembodied limestone arm, presumably missing from a nearby "unfinished" sculpture.

== Controversy ==
There is pushback against having Otterness' work in public areas that hold status due to his 1977 work Shot Dog Film in which Otterness shot and killed a dog on film. This act not only incited an investigation into Otterness by the Animal Protection Institute, but also protests against his installations.
