= Sewer Gators =

- Directed by: Paul Dale
- Written by: Paul Dale
- Starring: Manon Pages; Austin Naulty; Kenny Bellau
- Release date: June 3, 2022
- Country: United States
- Language: English

Sewer Gators is a 2022 American horror comedy film written and directed by Paul Dale, and starring Manon Pages, Austin Naulty, and Kenny Bellau. The film was released on Blu-ray, DVD, and video-on-demand (VOD) on June 3, 2022.

== Cast ==
- Manon Pages as Laura Andrews, an alligator expert
- Austin Naulty as Shane, an alligator hunter
- Kenny Bellau as Sheriff Mitchell

== Production ==
=== Casting ===
Writer-director Paul Dale first met actress Manon Pages some time prior to the production of Sewer Gators when Pages responded to a Craigslist advertisement that was seeking actors. Dale had met Austin Naulty during the production of the 2016 film Silent but Deadly, and met Kenny Bellau during the production of a commercial.
