= Sewer alligator =

Urban legend

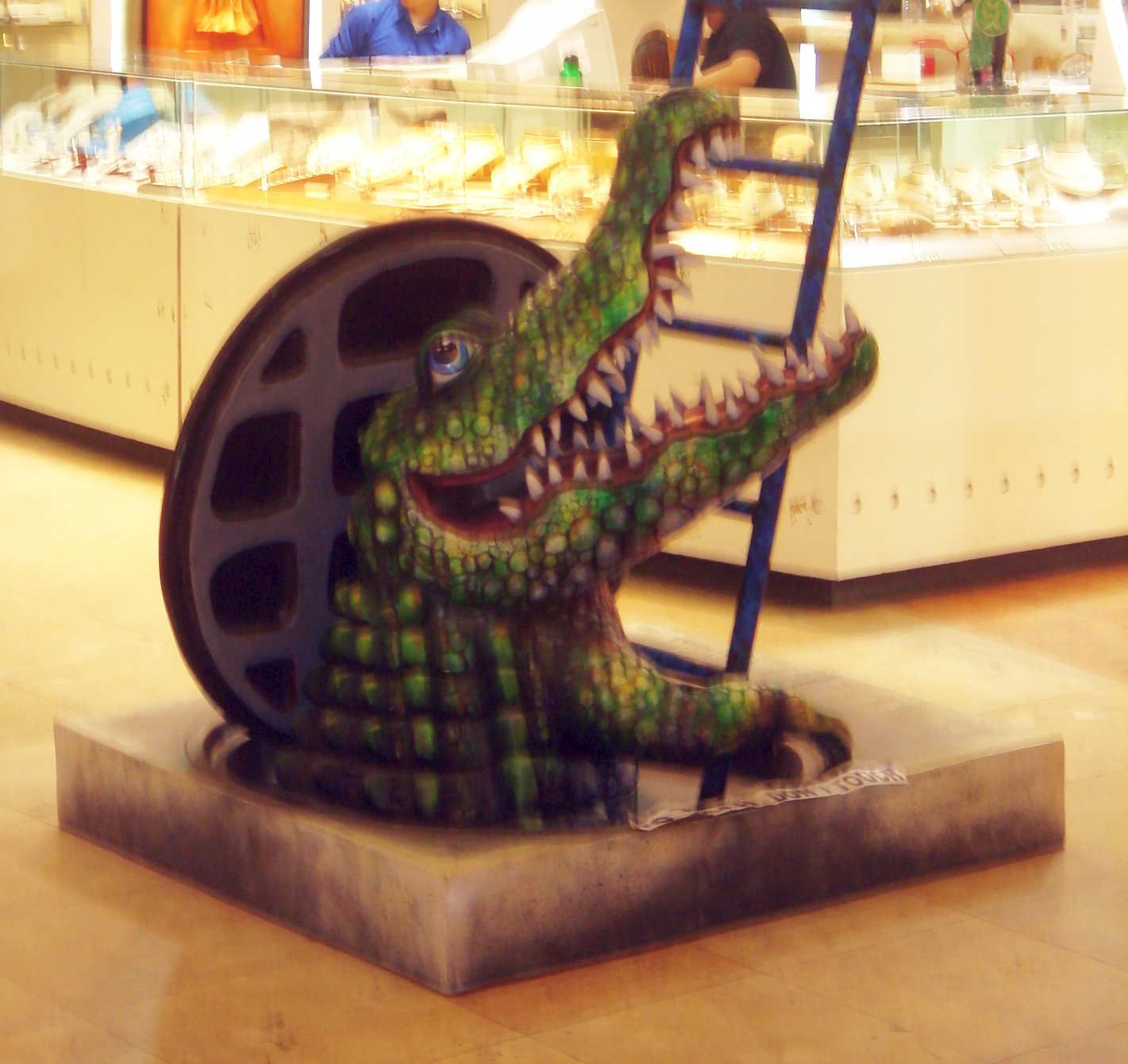
A model of an alligator emerging from a sewer manhole in a shopping center

The sewer alligator is an urban legend about alligators that are said to live in sewers outside alligators' native range. Some cities in which sewer alligators have supposedly been found are New York City and Paris. Accounts of fully grown sewer alligators are unproven, but small alligators are sometimes rescued from sewers. Stories date back to the late 1920s and early 1930s.

The New York Times reports that the city rescues several alligators each year. Some are taken directly from homes where people keep them illegally. These small alligators can be bought online in other states and shipped legally when they are tiny. Other alligators are found outdoors, where they attract a lot of attention, though usually they are above ground.

Escaped or abandoned alligators may survive for a short time in New York's sewers. However, they cannot live there long-term because the sewers are too cold and contain harmful bacteria from human waste. Sewer workers say there is no hidden population of alligators living underground.

== Legend ==
The legend of alligators inhabiting the sewer system of New York City is a widely circulated urban myth. It suggests that alligators navigate the city's sewers, preying on rats and other refuse, and posing a threat to sewer workers, who are said to carry firearms for protection. According to the lore, these alligators are often described as large and vicious, with some attributing a lack of pigmentation to their purported status as "albinos." The urban myth has permeated popular culture, featuring in various forms of media including books, television shows, and movies. It has also inspired hoaxes and artistic projects, and is commemorated in the city with a quasi-holiday known as Alligator in the Sewer Day, celebrated on February 9.

Following reports of sewer alligators in the 1930s, the story built up over the decades and became more of a contemporary legend. It is questionable how accurate the original stories are, and some have even suggested they are fictions created by Teddy May, who was the Commissioner of Sewers at the time. Interviews with him were the basis of the first published accounts of sewer alligators. A similar story from 1851 involves feral pigs in the sewers of Hampstead, London.

=== Louisiana or Florida to New York City ===
As late as the middle of the 20th century, souvenir shops in Florida sold live baby alligators (in small fish tanks) as novelty souvenirs. Tourists from New York City would buy a baby alligator and try to raise it as a pet. When the alligator grew too large for comfort, the family would proceed to flush the reptile down the toilet.

The most common story is that the alligators survive and reside within the sewer and reproduce, feeding on rats and garbage, growing to huge sizes and striking fear into sewer workers. In Robert Daley's book The World Beneath the City (1959) he comments that one night a sewer worker in New York City was shocked to find a large albino alligator swimming toward him. Weeks of hunting followed.

The Journal of American Folklore has this to say on the subject:

"According to May, sewer inspectors first reported seeing alligators in 1935, but neither May nor anyone else believed them. "Instead, he set men to watch the sewer walkers to find out how they were obtaining whisky down in the pipes." Persistent reports, however, perhaps including the newspaper item discovered by Coleman, caused May to go down to find out for himself. He found that the reports were true. "The beam of his own flashlight had spotlighted alligators whose length, on the average, was about two feet."

May started an extermination campaign, using poisoned bait followed by flooding of the side tunnels to flush the beasts out into the major arteries where hunters with .22 rifles were waiting. He announced in 1937 that the 'gators were gone. Reported sightings in 1948 and 1966 were not confirmed.

However, there is no mention of "blind albino" alligators, and May suggests that the baby alligators were dumped down storm drains rather than "flushed down the toilet".

An additional reference to the sewer alligator exists in Thomas Pynchon's first novel, V. It fictionalizes the account, stating Macy's was selling them for a time for 50 cents. Eventually the children became bored with the pets, setting them loose in the streets as well as flushing them into the sewers. Rather than poison, shotguns were used as the remedy. Benny Profane, one of the main characters in the book, continues to hunt them as a full-time job until the population is reduced.

A 1973 children's book, The Great Escape: Or, The Sewer Story by Peter Lippman anthropomorphizes these alligators and has them dress up in disguise as humans and charter an airplane to fly them home to the Florida swamps.

=== Versions including albinos and mutants ===
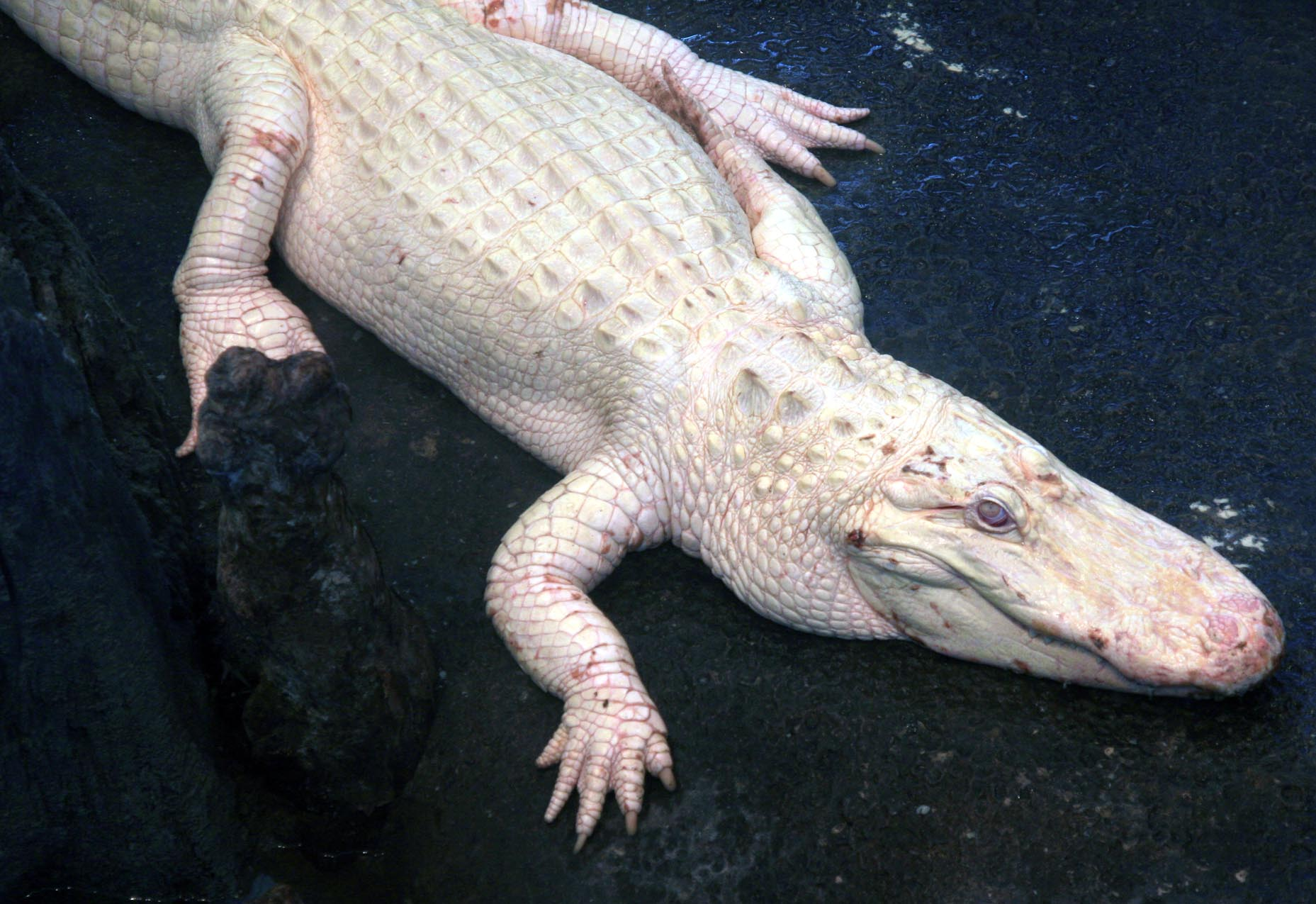
An albino alligator at the California Academy of Sciences

Some claims go further to suggest that, after the alligator was disposed of at such a young age, it would live the majority of its life in an environment not exposed to sunlight, and thus it would apparently in time lose its eyesight and the pigment in its hide and that the reptile would grow to be blind and completely albino (pure white in color with red or pink eyes). Another reason why an albino alligator would retreat to an underground sewer is its vulnerability to the sun in the wild; as there is no dark pigment in the creature's skin, it has no protection from the sun, which makes it very hard for it to survive in the wild.

Some people even spoke of mutant alligators living in the sewers which have been exposed to many different types of toxic chemical waste which altered them, making them deformed and sometimes even larger and with strange colouring. A gigantic mutant alligator based on these myths appears in the 1980 film Alligator.

=== Contemporary accounts ===
One 1927 account describes an experience of a Pittsburgh Bureau of Highways and Sewers employee who was assigned the task of clearing out a section of sewer pipe on Royal Street in the Northside Section of the city. The account reads, "[He] removed the manhole cover and began to clear an obstruction when he realized that a set of 'evil looking eyes' was staring at him." He then removed a 3-foot (0.91 m) alligator and took it home with him. There are other numerous recent media accounts of alligators occupying storm drains and sewer pipes, all from states in the southern US.

In Paris, France, a Nile crocodile was captured by firefighters in the sewers below the Pont Neuf bridge on March 7, 1984. The crocodile, named Eleonore (or Eleanore), lived at the Aquarium in Vannes and died in May 2022.

A 2-foot (0.61 m) baby alligator was caught in August 2010 by the NYPD in the sewers in Queens. However, it is unlikely that a fully grown adult would survive for long in New York, due to the cold winter temperatures.

== Real alligators in sewers ==
Alligators are occasionally sighted in the drains and sewers of Florida, due to many of these waste outlets' backing out onto the swamps. During storm surges and in the colder winter months, alligators sometimes shelter in convenient drains and hunt for rats to supplement their diet. A 2024 study using wildlife cameras to investigate storm sewers around Alachua County documented the presence of 35 species of wildlife, including alligators.

== See also ==
- Alligator (film)
- Killer Croc
- Leatherhead (Teenage Mutant Ninja Turtles)
- Sewer Gators (film)
- Where's My Water?
