= New Lots Avenue =

New Lots Avenue may refer to the following stations of the New York City Subway in Brooklyn:

- New Lots Avenue station (BMT Canarsie Line) at Van Sinderen Avenue, serving the L train
- New Lots Avenue station (IRT New Lots Line) at Livonia Avenue, serving the 2, 3, 4, and 5 trains
