= New Lots Avenue station (BMT Canarsie Line) =

New York City Subway station in Brooklyn

New Lots Avenue
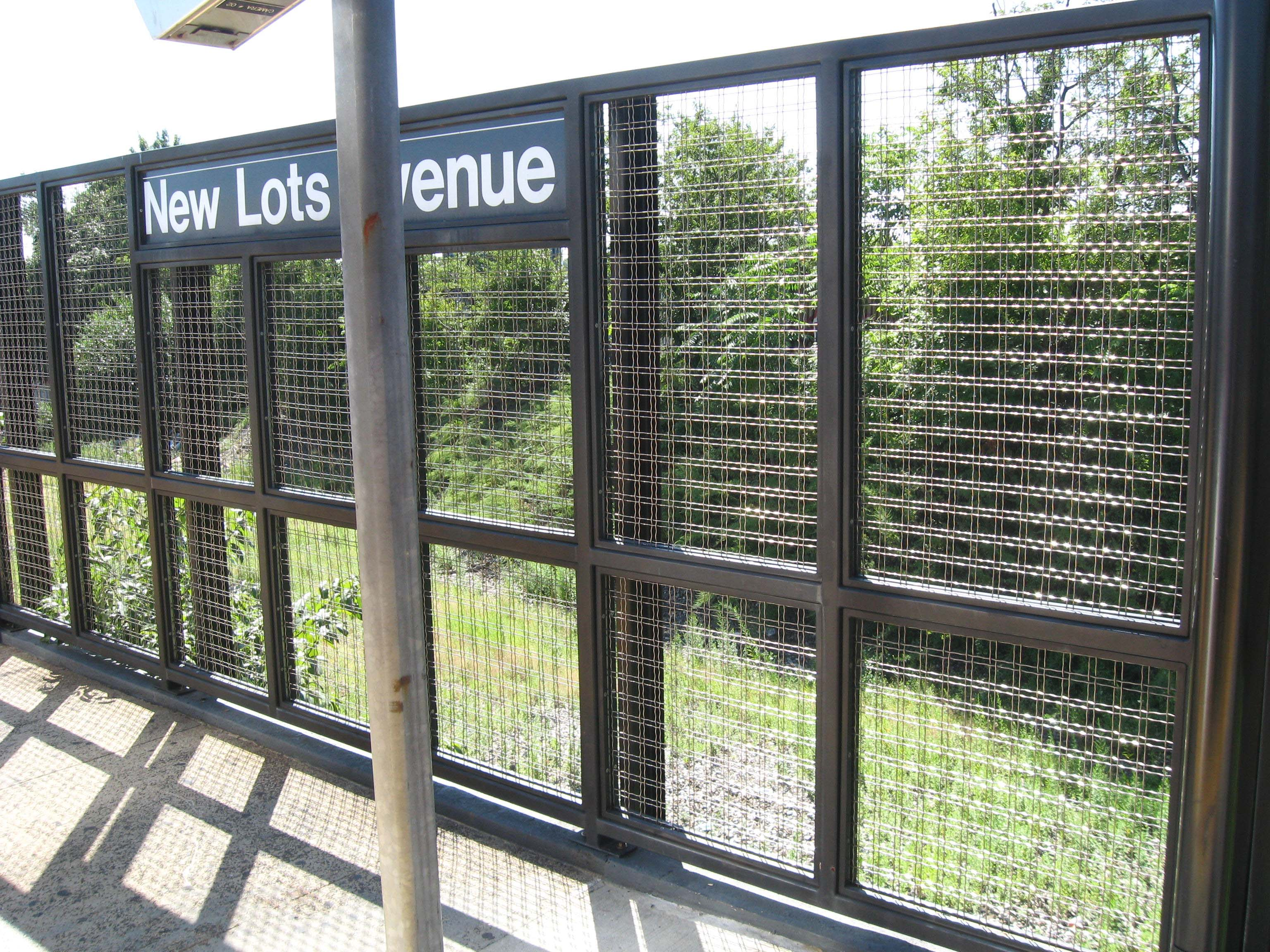
- Southbound platform

Station statistics
- Address: New Lots Avenue & Van Sinderen Avenue; Brooklyn, New York
- Borough: Brooklyn
- Locale: Brownsville, East New York
- Coordinates: 40.659025°N 73.899364°W
- Division: B (BMT)
- Line: BMT Canarsie Line
- Services: L (all times)
- Transit: NYCT Bus: B15
- Structure: Embankment
- Platforms: 2 side platforms
- Tracks: 2

Other information
- Opened: July 28, 1906; 120 years ago
- Former/other names: New Lots Road

Traffic
- 2025: 772,060 ▲12.2%
- Rank: 346 out of 423
Services
| Preceding station | New York City Subway | Following station |
|---|---|---|
| Livonia Avenue toward Eighth Avenue | L (New York City Subway service) | East 105th Street toward Canarsie–Rockaway Parkway |
Former services
| Preceding station | Long Island Rail Road | Following station |
|---|---|---|
| Rugby toward Bay Ridge | Bay Ridge Branch At New Lots Road station (closed 1897) | East New York toward Fresh Pond |
Location
Location within New York City Subway
Location within New York City
Location within New York
Track layout
Street map
Station service legend
| Symbol | Description |
| Stops all times | Stops all times |

The New Lots Avenue station (originally New Lots Road) is an elevated station on the BMT Canarsie Line of the New York City Subway. Located at the intersection of New Lots and Van Sinderen Avenues at the border of Brownsville and East New York, Brooklyn, it is served by the L train at all times.

== History ==
This station opened on July 28, 1906.

The Canarsie-bound platform was closed for renovation from December 2, 1963 to April 2, 1964, and the Manhattan-bound platform was closed for renovation from April 2 to July 23, 1964. The entire project cost $214,700. As part of the project the wooden platforms were replaced with concrete platforms, and canopies and fluorescent lights were installed.

The station was renovated again in 2006-2007 at a cost of $10.58 million. The station renovation included the installation of new platform edges with yellow tactile warning strips, beige windscreens and red canopies (both with green frames), and the installation of artwork.

Plans for the Interborough Express, a light rail line using the Bay Ridge Branch right of way, were announced in 2023. As part of the project, a light rail station at Linden Boulevard has been proposed next to the existing New Lots Avenue subway station.

== Station layout ==
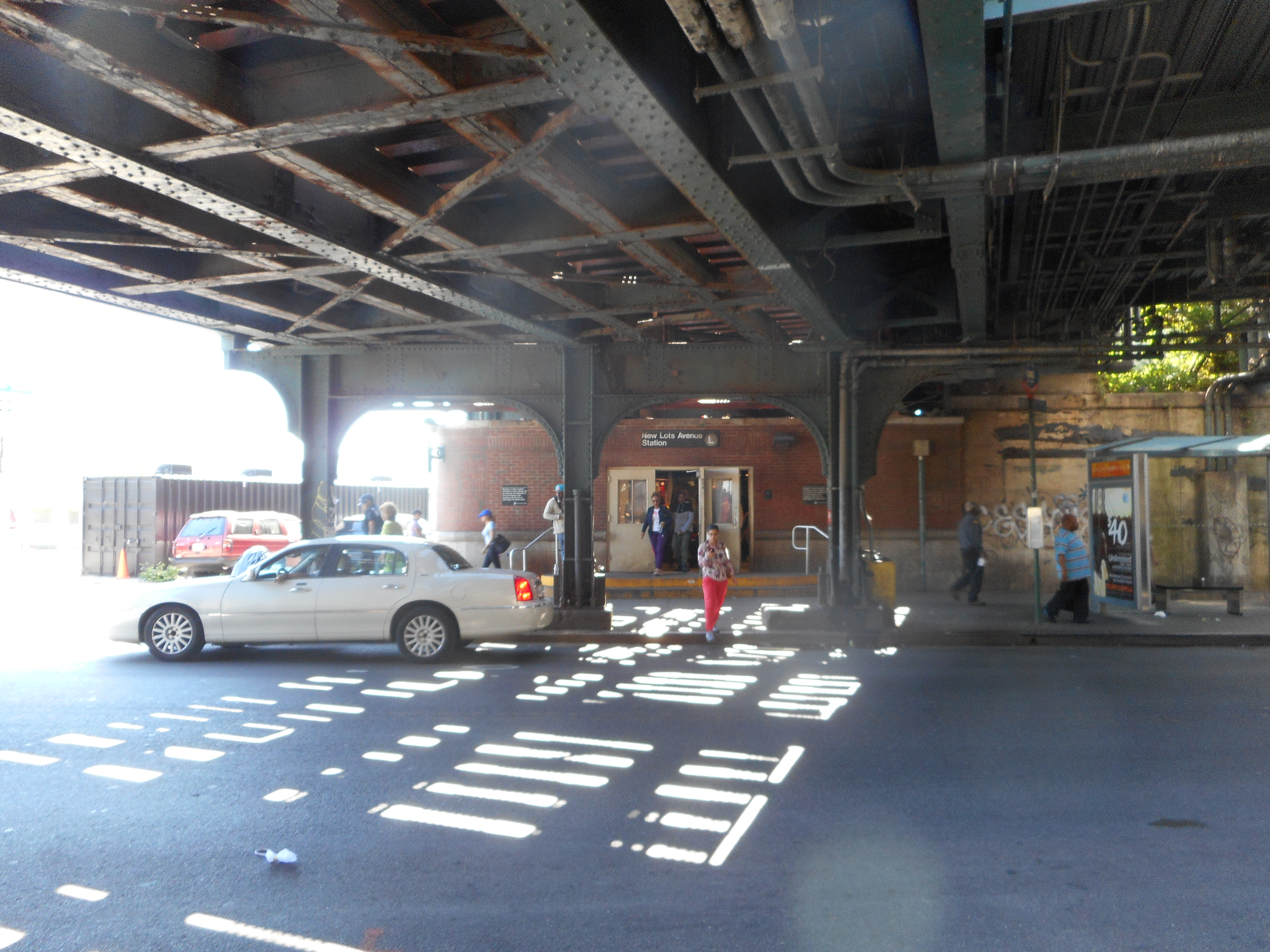
The station entrance beneath the bridge for the tracks.

This elevated station has two tracks and two offset side platforms. The platforms have windscreens and canopies at their centers and woven-wire fences with dark gray steel frames at either ends.

This station's 2007 artwork is called 16 Windows by Eugenie Tung. It features eight stained glass windows on each platform windscreen. The ones on the Manhattan-bound platform depict people doing morning activities like eating breakfast and brushing teeth while those on the Canarsie-bound platform depict people doing evening activities like eating dinner and getting ready for bed.

To the south, the Canarsie Line lowers to run at-grade to East 105th Street and Canarsie–Rockaway Parkway. To the north, it becomes an elevated structure to Livonia Avenue until just west of Broadway Junction.

=== Exit ===
The station's only entrance is via a ground-level station house beneath the tracks on the southwest corner of Van Sinderen and New Lots Avenues. Inside is a token booth, turnstile bank, and two staircases to the Canarsie-bound platform and one to the Manhattan-bound one, all at their centers.
