= East 105th Street station =

New York City Subway station in Brooklyn

East 105 Street
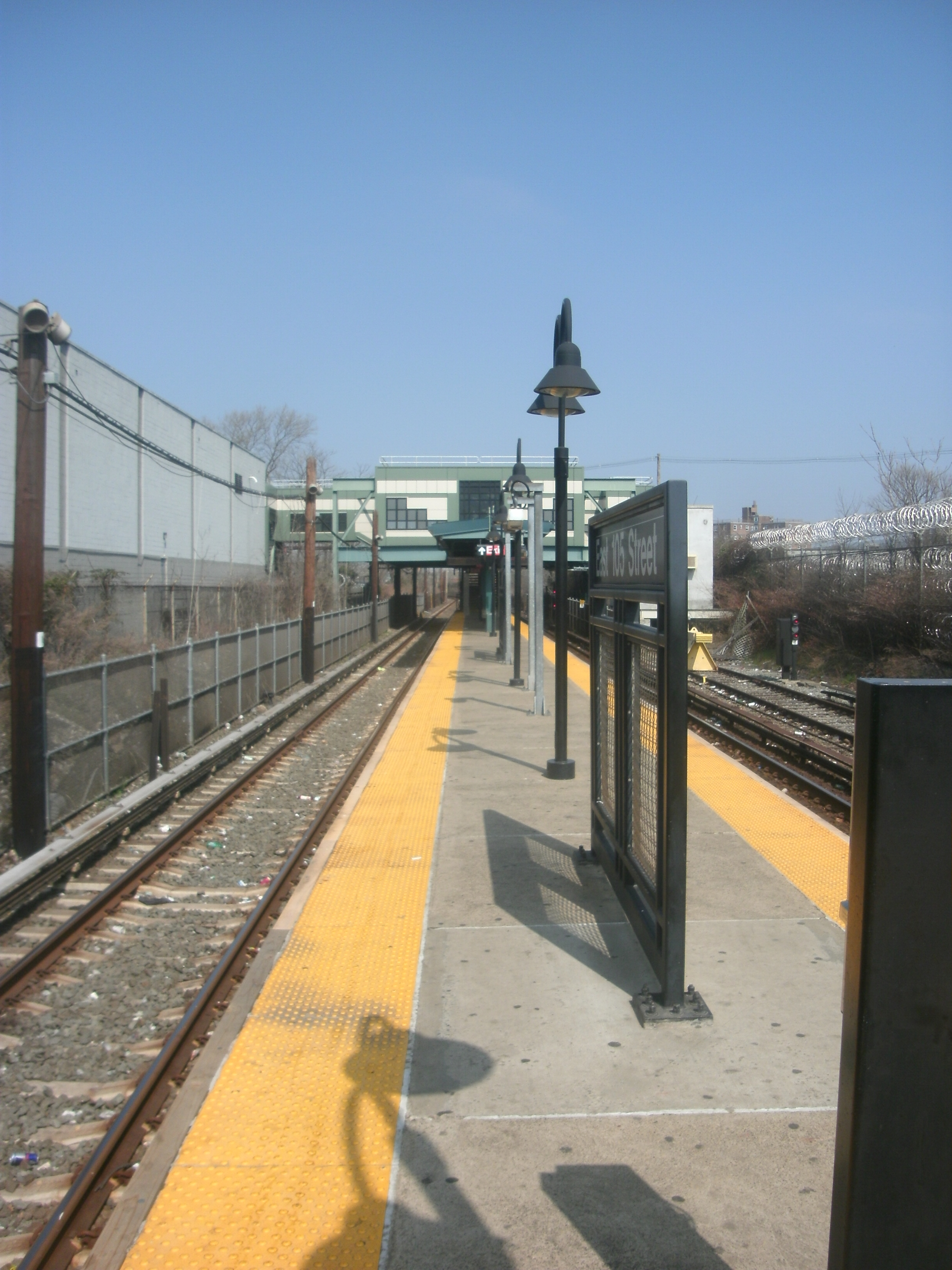
- Platform view; the station house at East 105th Street is in the background

Station statistics
- Address: East 105th Street & Farragut Road; Brooklyn, New York
- Borough: Brooklyn
- Locale: Canarsie
- Coordinates: 40.651308°N 73.899021°W
- Division: B (BMT)
- Line: BMT Canarsie Line
- Services: L (all times)
- Structure: At-grade
- Platforms: 1 island platform
- Tracks: 3 (1 not for passenger service)

Other information
- Opened: July 28, 1906; 120 years ago

Traffic
- 2025: 584,526 ▲4.1%
- Rank: 375 out of 423
Services
Preceding station	New York City Subway	Following station
New Lots Avenue toward Eighth Avenue	L (New York City Subway service)	Canarsie–Rockaway Parkway Terminus
Location
Location within New York City Subway
Location within New York City
Location within New York
Track layout
Street map
Station service legend
Symbol	Description
Stops all times	Stops all times

The East 105th Street station is a grade-level station on the BMT Canarsie Line of the New York City Subway. Located near East 105th Street between Foster Avenue and Farragut Road in Canarsie, Brooklyn, it is served by the L train at all times.

== History ==
This opened on July 28, 1906, as a replacement for a former station along a steam dummy line known as the Brooklyn and Rockaway Beach Railroad.

The station was rebuilt twice: in the 1970s and in 2005. The latter renovation cost $9.66 million.

== Station layout ==
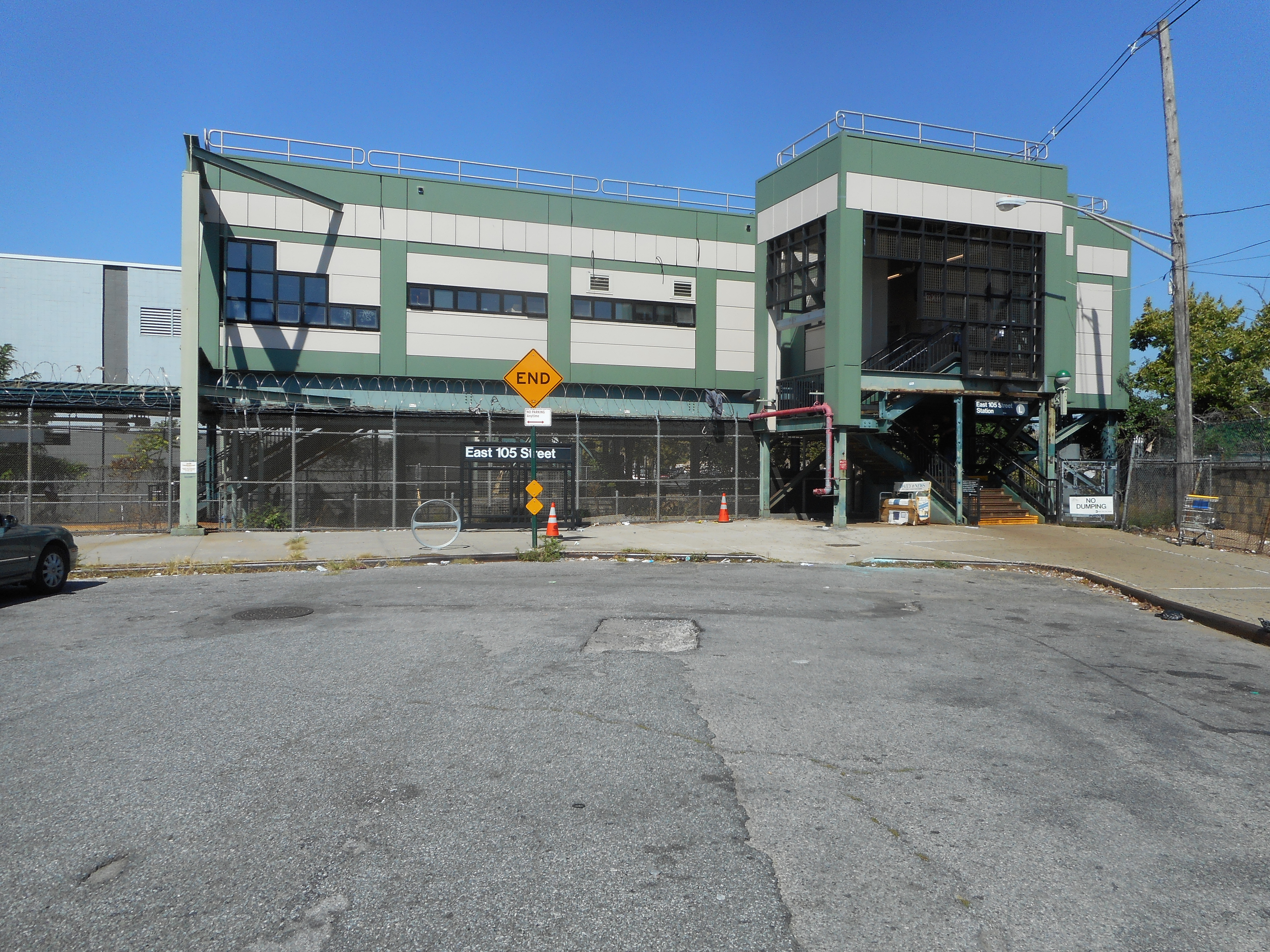
Site of former grade crossing at the station

This grade-level station has three tracks and a narrow island platform. The platform, which only has one single-sided bench, serves the middle track (Manhattan-bound) and northern one (Rockaway Parkway-bound). The southernmost track is a stub-end track that leads to the Canarsie Yard.

The only grade crossing of the subway system was located at where East 105th Street crossed the Canarsie Line. It was located at the site of the current station house. The crossing was eliminated on August 5, 1973. The grade crossing elimination was part of the construction of the Flatlands Industrial Park.

The MTA still lists the station being at Turnbull Avenue, a dirt road which once ran along the tracks but no longer exists. A part of Turnbull Avenue, directly northeast of the station, is still extant as a driveway that runs to the southeast of the line from Stanley Avenue/East 108th Street to just short of the East 105th Street station's station house.

The artwork here is called Crescendo by Michael Ingui. Installed during a 2007 renovation, it consists of stained glass windows near the staircases. The renovation also resulted in a short canopy being installed above the platform. There is a substation just south of the station.

=== Exits ===
The station's only exit and entrance is via a station house directly above the platform and tracks at their extreme east (railroad north) end. A staircase from the platform goes up to a waiting area, where a turnstile bank provides access to and from the station. Outside fare control, there is a token booth and two staircases, each going down to both dead-ends of East 105th Street.
