= Chauncey Street station =

New York City Subway station in Brooklyn

Chauncey Street
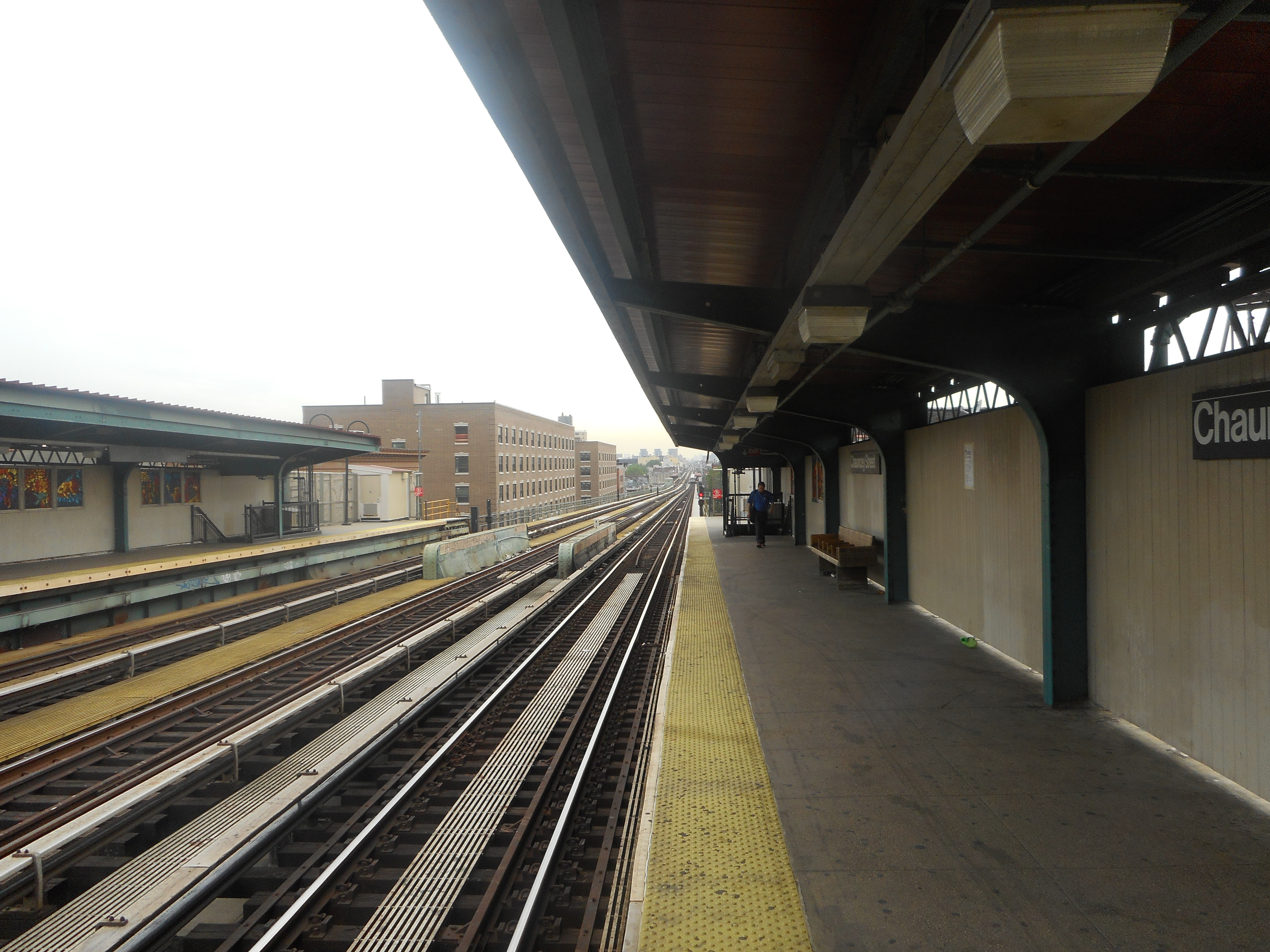
- View down southbound platform

Station statistics
- Address: Chauncey Street and Broadway; Brooklyn, New York
- Borough: Brooklyn
- Locale: Bedford–Stuyvesant, Bushwick
- Coordinates: 40.682623°N 73.910136°W
- Division: B (BMT)
- Line: BMT Jamaica Line
- Services: J (all except rush hours, peak direction); Z (rush hours, peak direction)
- Transit: NYCT Bus: B20, B60, Q24
- Structure: Elevated
- Platforms: 2 side platforms
- Tracks: 3 (2 in regular service)

Other information
- Opened: July 18, 1885; 141 years ago

Traffic
- 2025: 686,247 ▲12.9%
- Rank: 354 out of 423
Services
Preceding station	New York City Subway	Following station
Gates Avenue Z skip-stop	J/Z (New York City Subway service)	Broadway Junction J Z toward Jamaica Center–York College
Halsey Street J toward Broad Street	J/Z (New York City Subway service)	Broadway Junction J Z toward Jamaica Center–York College
Location
Location within New York City Subway
Location within New York City
Location within New York
Track layout
Street map
Station service legend
Symbol	Description
Stops all times except rush hours in the peak direction	Stops all times except rush hours in the peak direction
Stops rush hours in the peak direction only	Stops rush hours in the peak direction only
Stops all times	Stops all times
Stops all times except late nights	Stops all times except late nights

The Chauncey Street station is a local station on the BMT Jamaica Line of the New York City Subway. Located at the intersection of Chauncey Street and Broadway in Brooklyn, it is served by the J train at all times except rush hours in the peak direction, when the Z train takes over service.

== Station layout ==
There are two side platforms and three tracks; the center express track is not used in regular service.

The 2002 artwork here is called El-Views by Maria Dominguez and it features scenes of neighborhood life.

=== Exits ===
The station has exits on both the west (railroad north) end and the east (railroad south) end of its platforms. However, and despite the station's name, the eastern exits to Chauncey Street are no longer open.

On the west end, each platform has a single staircase leading to an elevated station house beneath the tracks. It has a turnstile bank and token booth. Outside fare control, two staircases lead to both western corners of Rockaway Avenue and Broadway.

The eastern exits are now emergency exits leading to both the north and south sides of Broadway just west of Marion and Chauncey Streets. These exits were closed in the 1980s due to high crime. There is a closed station house around the intermediate level of the staircases.
