= Broadway Junction station =

New York City Subway station in Brooklyn

Broadway Junction
- New York City Subway station complex
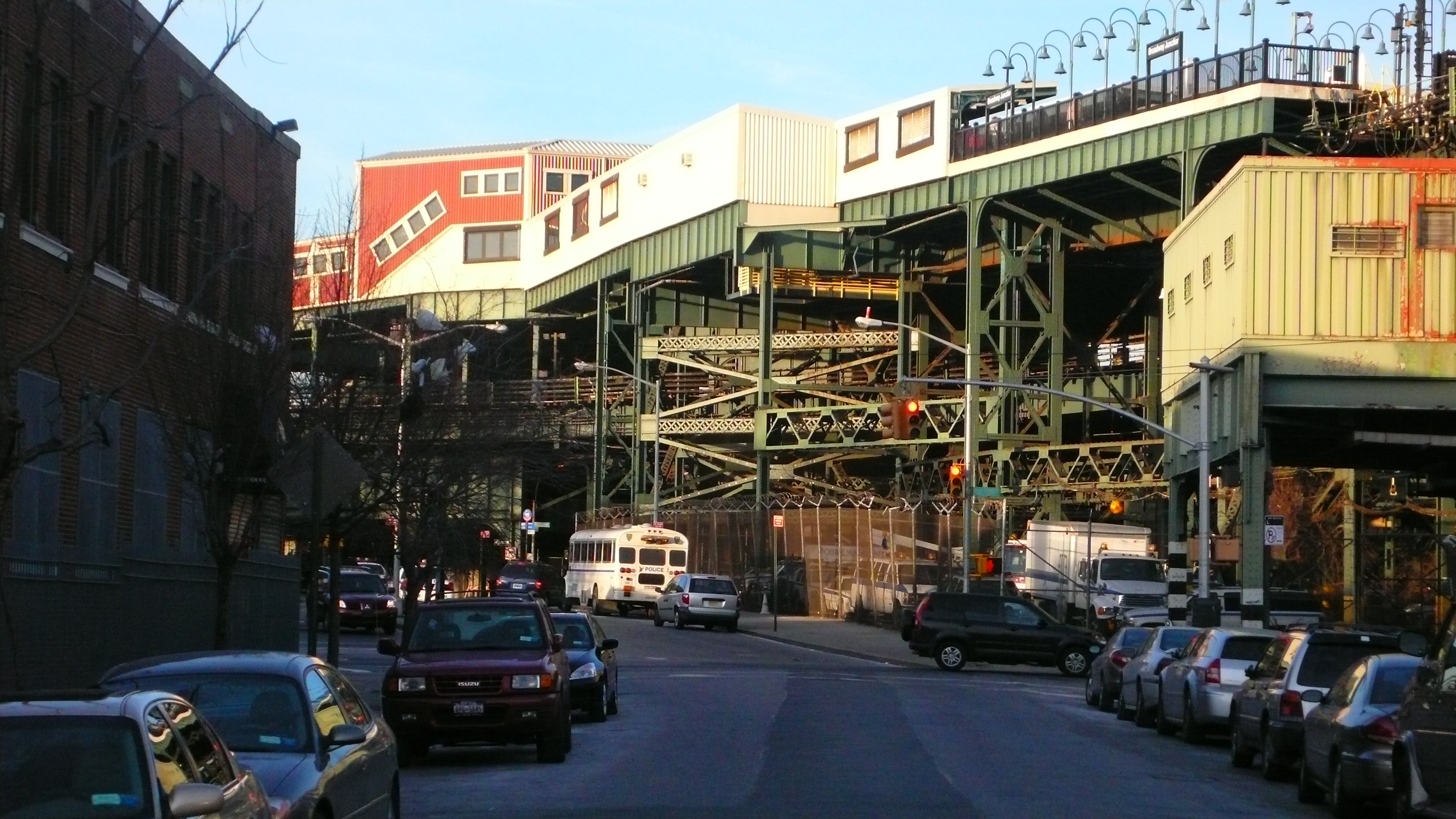
- The elevated part of the complex

Station statistics
- Address: Van Sinderen Avenue and Fulton Street; Brooklyn, New York
- Borough: Brooklyn
- Locale: East New York (subdivision) Cypress Hills, Bedford–Stuyvesant (subdivision) Ocean Hill, Bushwick
- Coordinates: 40°40′44.11″N 73°54′12.43″W
- Division: B (BMT/IND)
- Line: BMT Canarsie Line; IND Fulton Street Line; BMT Jamaica Line
- Services: A (all times); C (all except late nights); J (all times); L (all times); Z (rush hours, peak direction)
- Transit: NYCT Bus: B20, B25, B83, Q24, Q56; LIRR East New York station
- Levels: 3

Other information
- Accessible: No; under construction

Traffic
- 2025: 1,836,336 ▲1.7%
- Rank: 192 out of 423
Location
Location within New York City Subway
Location within New York City
Location within New York
Street map
Station service legend
Symbol	Description
Stops rush hours in the peak direction only	Stops rush hours in the peak direction only
Stops all times except late nights	Stops all times except late nights
Stops all times	Stops all times

The Broadway Junction station is a New York City Subway station complex shared by the elevated BMT Canarsie Line and BMT Jamaica Line, and the underground IND Fulton Street Line. It was also served by trains of the Fulton Street Elevated until that line closed in 1956. It is located roughly at the intersection of Broadway, Fulton Street and Van Sinderen Avenue at the border of the Bedford–Stuyvesant, Bushwick and East New York neighborhoods of Brooklyn. The complex is served by the A, J, and L trains at all times; the C train except at night; and the Z train during rush hours in the peak direction.

The station is adjacent to the East New York Yard and a complex track junction between the tracks leading to the yard, the Canarsie Line, and the Jamaica Line. The structure of the elevated station still contains the ironwork for the trackways used by the old Fulton Elevated. The station has a single exit and entrance through a fare control building located at the eastern end of the Fulton Street Line station. There is evidence of closed exits from the Jamaica Line platforms. There is also a New York City Police Department (NYPD) transit precinct at the station.

The station opened as Manhattan Junction as part of the BMT Lexington Avenue Line in 1885. In 1900, an elevated connection was made with the Fulton Street Elevated, resulting in a change in service patterns. Lexington Avenue and Fulton Street trains were through-routed, going around the East New York Loop, with service to Cypress Hills requiring a transfer. The station started to be used by service to Canarsie in 1906. In 1919, the Manhattan Junction station was replaced by the current station which was then known as Eastern Parkway. The modern-day Canarsie Line platforms, known as Broadway Junction, opened in 1928 when that line was connected to the 14th Street–Eastern District Line. The Independent Subway System's Fulton Street Line was extended to Broadway–East New York in 1946, and the three stations were combined as one station complex on July 1, 1948. The names of the stations in the complex were conformed to Broadway Junction in 2003.

Although Broadway Junction ranked 166th in the system for passenger entries in 2016, with 3,085,401 total entries, it is Brooklyn's third-busiest station in terms of passenger activity. It sees 100,000 passengers per day as of 2017, the vast majority of whom use it to make transfers. In 2017, the New York City Economic Development Corporation started studying options to rezone the surrounding area as a transit hub.

== History ==
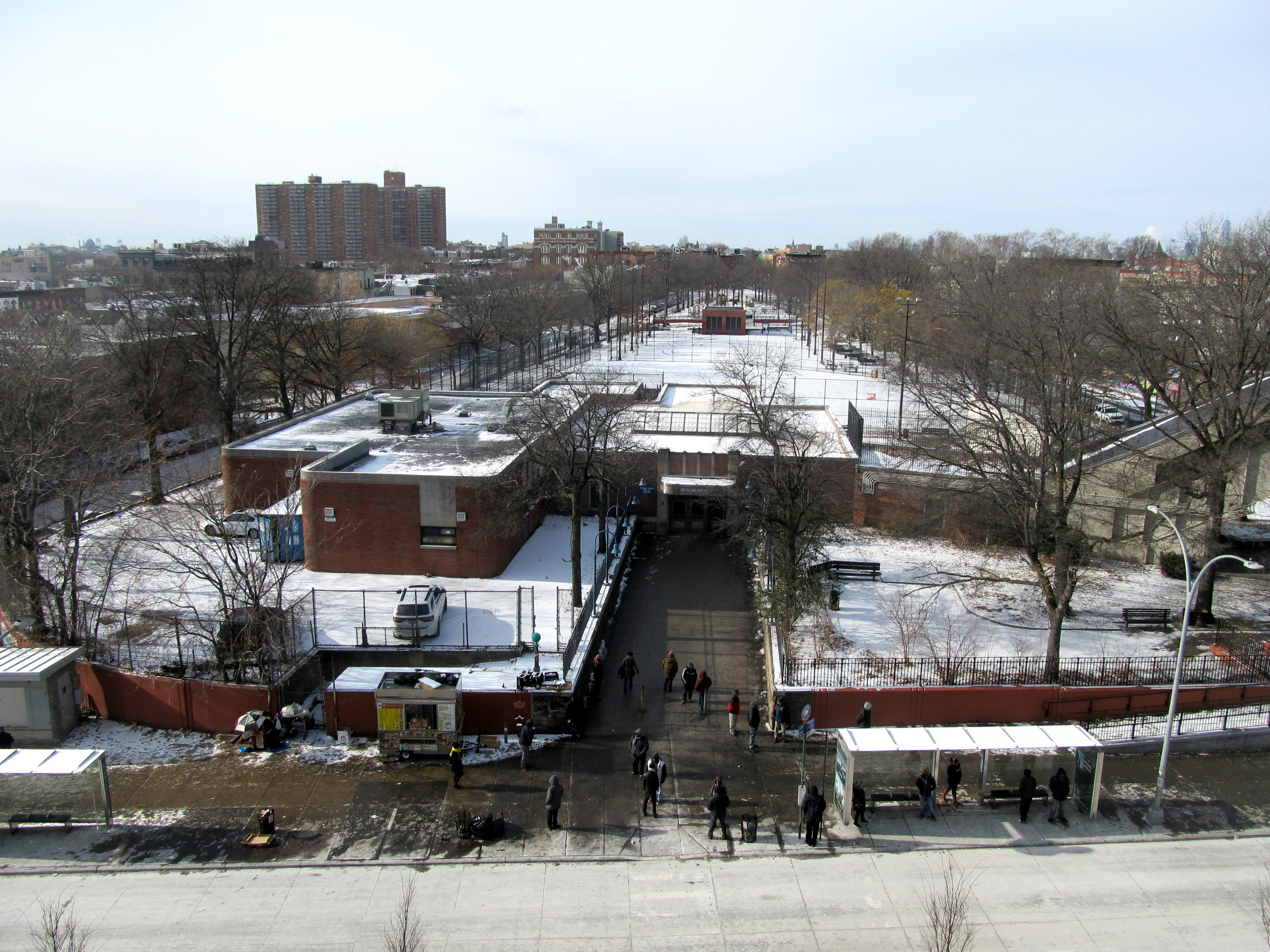
Looking west at the complex's head house and Callahan-Kelly Playground, located above the IND station

The Broadway Junction station complex is shared by the elevated BMT Canarsie and BMT Jamaica Lines and the underground IND Fulton Street Line. Throughout the history of the area, this has been a key junction point between various different rail lines. What is now Broadway Junction sits atop the historical Jamaica Pass, the junction of the modern Broadway, Fulton Street, and Jamaica Avenue. The Pass is where these roads passed through the valleys of the area, which are part of the terminal moraine created by the Wisconsin glaciation.

=== BMT complex ===
The first rail service in the area was the Atlantic Branch of the Long Island Rail Road (LIRR) at East New York station. The line opened as the Brooklyn and Jamaica Railroad in 1836, under lease to the LIRR, but did not include a station at East New York until early 1843. The Brooklyn and Rockaway Beach Railroad (the predecessor to the BMT Canarsie Line) began service in the area in 1865. The name Manhattan Junction or Manhattan Beach Junction was applied to the station on what is now the Jamaica Line when it opened in 1885; the area had been known as Manhattan Beach Crossing since before then, due to the crossing of the LIRR's Manhattan Beach Division. A station on the Fulton Street Elevated railroad at Sackman Street opened on July 4, 1889, when the line was extended to Atlantic Avenue.

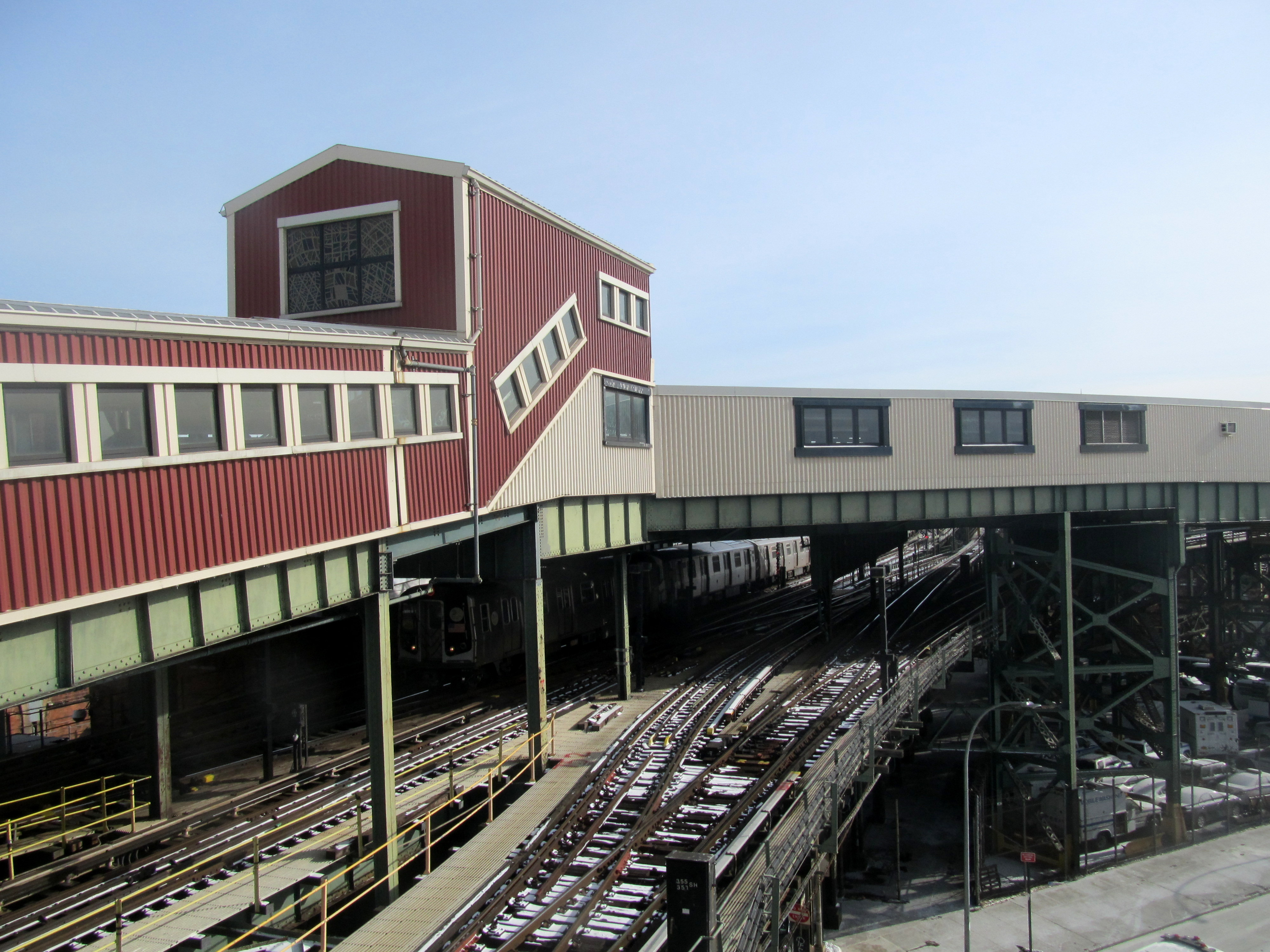
Passageway above the Jamaica Line platforms, leading to the Canarsie Line platforms

A two-track, one-half-block elevated connection was built on the east side of Vesta Avenue (now Van Sinderen Avenue) between the Fulton Street and Broadway Lines. This connection, equipped with a third rail to supply electric power, was opened on August 9, 1900, and new service patterns were implemented: during times other than rush hours, Lexington Avenue and Fulton Street trains were through-routed, and travel beyond Manhattan Junction required a transfer. This "East New York Loop" was unpopular, and was soon stopped; the next service to use the tracks was the BMT Canarsie Line to Broadway Ferry (later the 15 train), joined to the Fulton Street Line at Pitkin and Snediker Avenues in 1906.

The name was changed from Manhattan Junction to Broadway Junction in 1913. The Dual Contracts were signed on March 19, 1913, between the City and the Interborough Rapid Transit Company and the Brooklyn Rapid Transit Company (BRT). As part of the agreement, the BRT, which owned the elevated lines in Brooklyn, agreed to construct bidirectional express tracks on the Fulton and Broadway Elevateds. The Broadway express track was placed into service on December 23, 1916. The current Broadway Elevated station at Eastern Parkway opened on August 5, 1919, replacing the old Manhattan Junction station. The full BMT 14th Street-Canarsie Line was completed on July 14, 1928, with the opening of the segment connecting Broadway Junction with Montrose Avenue.

=== IND station ===
By 1936, the Independent Subway System's Fulton Street Line had been extended to Rockaway Avenue. At that time, Broadway Junction was an all-Brooklyn–Manhattan Transit (BMT) transfer point. Further eastward extension of the line was delayed by World War II; the Broadway–East New York station opened on December 30, 1946. A direct escalator passageway was constructed between the IND and BMT stations in East New York to allow passengers free transfers. The passageway opened on July 1, 1948. The Fulton Street Elevated was now redundant, and BMT service on the line closed entirely on April 26, 1956, with the eastern portion to Lefferts Boulevard connected to the IND.

The New York City Board of Transportation announced plans in November 1949 to spend $325,000 extending platforms at several IND stations, including Broadway–East New York, to accommodate 11-car, 660-foot (200 m) trains. The lengthened trains began running during rush hour on September 8, 1953, with eleven-car trains operating on weekdays. The project cost $400,000 and increased the total carrying capacity of rush-hour trains by 4,000 passengers. The operation of eleven-car trains ended in 1958 because of operational difficulties. The signal blocks, especially in Manhattan, were too short to accommodate the longer trains, and the motormen had a very small margin of error to properly align the train with the platform. It was found that operating ten-car trains allowed for two additional trains per hour to be scheduled.

=== Complex renovation and later years ===
The entire complex was renovated from 1999 to 2001. The design bid for the project was awarded in May 1996. As part of the project, an abandoned mezzanine and adjacent staircases were removed, a new station booth was built and the public address system was improved. In 2001, as part of the work a piece of artwork made by Al Loving titled Brooklyn, New Morning was installed in the station. This piece of art consists of 75 unique glass panels arranged in a series throughout the complex and a mosaic mural wall that is 7–10 feet (2.1–3.0 m). This installation was part of MTA Arts & Design's program to install artwork in stations that undergo rehabilitations. Other necessary improvements were also completed as part of the project. For a long time, the stations within the complex went by three different names: the original Eastern Parkway on the BMT Jamaica Line, Broadway Junction on the BMT Canarsie Line, and Broadway–East New York (IND Fulton Street Line). Conformity between the station names was established in 2003.

As part of a project initiated in 2017 in which 200 blocks of land in East New York were rezoned for housing and improvements to area parks and schools were planned, the New York City Economic Development Corporation initiated a study to foster economic growth around Broadway Junction as a transit hub with residential and commercial uses. In 2018, the MTA announced several further improvements to the Broadway Junction station: new elevators for the Fulton Street Line platforms, as well as staircases for the Canarsie Line platforms and Jamaica Line platforms. Plans for the Interborough Express, a light rail line using the Bay Ridge Branch right of way, were announced in 2023. As part of the project, a light rail station at Atlantic Avenue has been proposed next to the existing subway station.

Mayor Eric Adams announced in May 2023 that the MTA would spend $400 million on improvements at the Broadway Junction station, including seven elevators, a new entrance on Van Sinderen Avenue directly to the Canarsie Line platforms, and replacement of all of the complex's escalators. In addition, the city government would spend $95 million to build pedestrian plazas around the station. AtkinsRéalis was hired in June 2024 to design the station's renovation, including accessibility improvements. Work on the project began in 2025, despite concerns from local residents that the project would result in gentrification. The MTA also announced in 2025 that a customer service center would open at the station. By 2026, a direct connection between the Fulton Street and Canarsie lines' platforms was planned to be complete that year, and the elevators were being installed.

== Station layout ==
The station complex is composed of three stations: the two elevated stations on the BMT Jamaica and Canarsie Lines, as well as the underground station on the IND Fulton Street Line. The IND station is accessible from the station's ground-level station house, at the east end of the station complex, using staircases down to platform level. The BMT lines are reachable from that same station house via escalators from street level to the upper mezzanine, which is located over the elevated BMT Jamaica Line platforms and at the BMT Canarsie Line's platform level. The two escalators, which were replaced in 2000, are long and steep. A footbridge leads from the upper mezzanine to the BMT Canarsie Line's northbound platform.

Despite having been renovated in the late 1990s, the Broadway Junction complex does not conform to the Americans with Disabilities Act of 1990, and there are no elevators in the station because the different parts of the complex are too far from each other. Because Broadway Junction is a major transfer station, the community identified this lack of access as a major issue. Calls for elevators were renewed in 2017, after the announcement of the L train shutdown in 2019–2020, which temporarily restricts Canarsie Line service to Manhattan during off-peak hours. In January 2018, the MTA announced that the IND Fulton Street Line platforms would receive elevators, and that elevators were also being studied for the BMT Jamaica Line platforms. However, the BMT Canarsie Line platforms were initially not expected to receive these improvements.

=== Exit ===
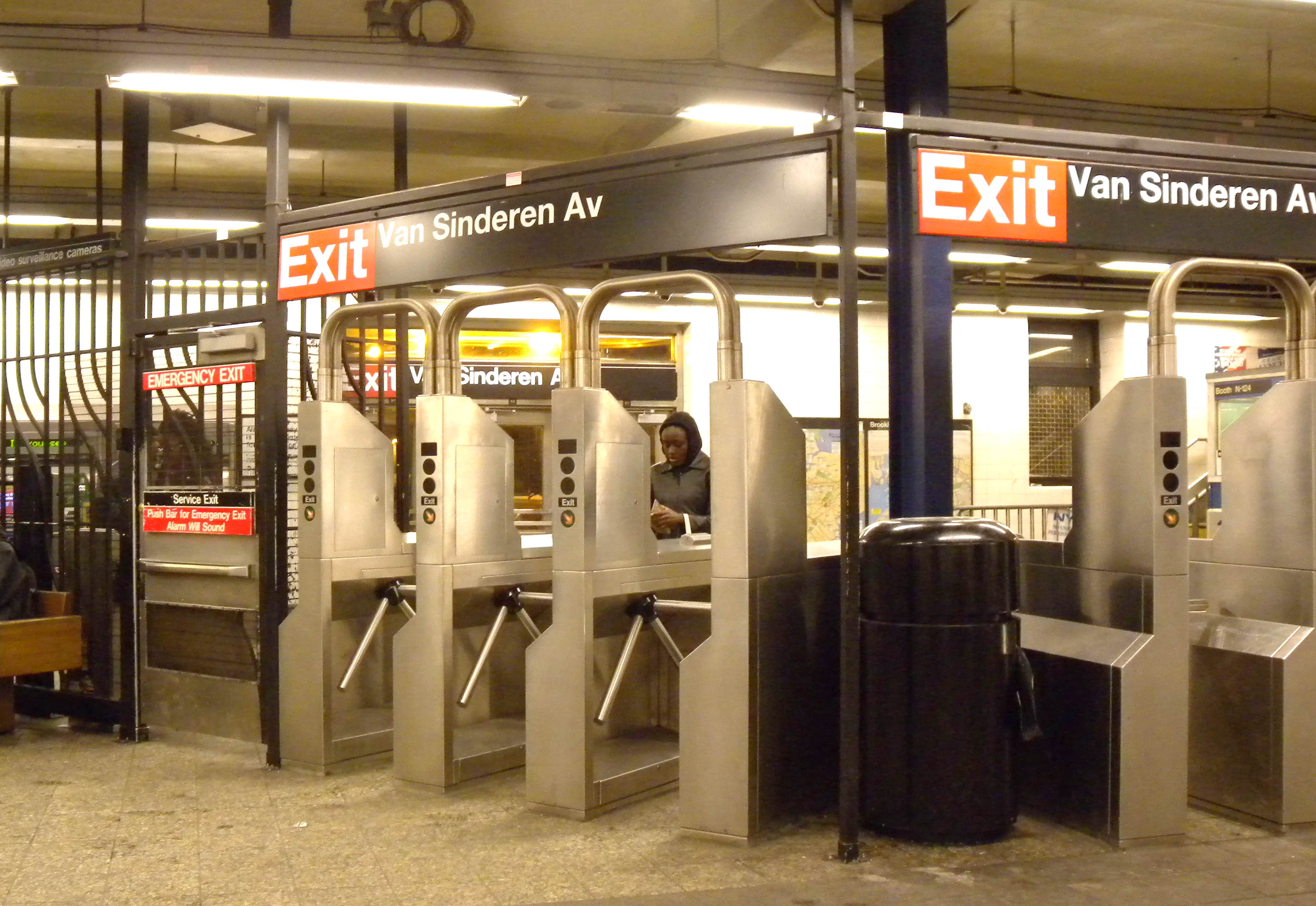
Van Sinderen Avenue fare control

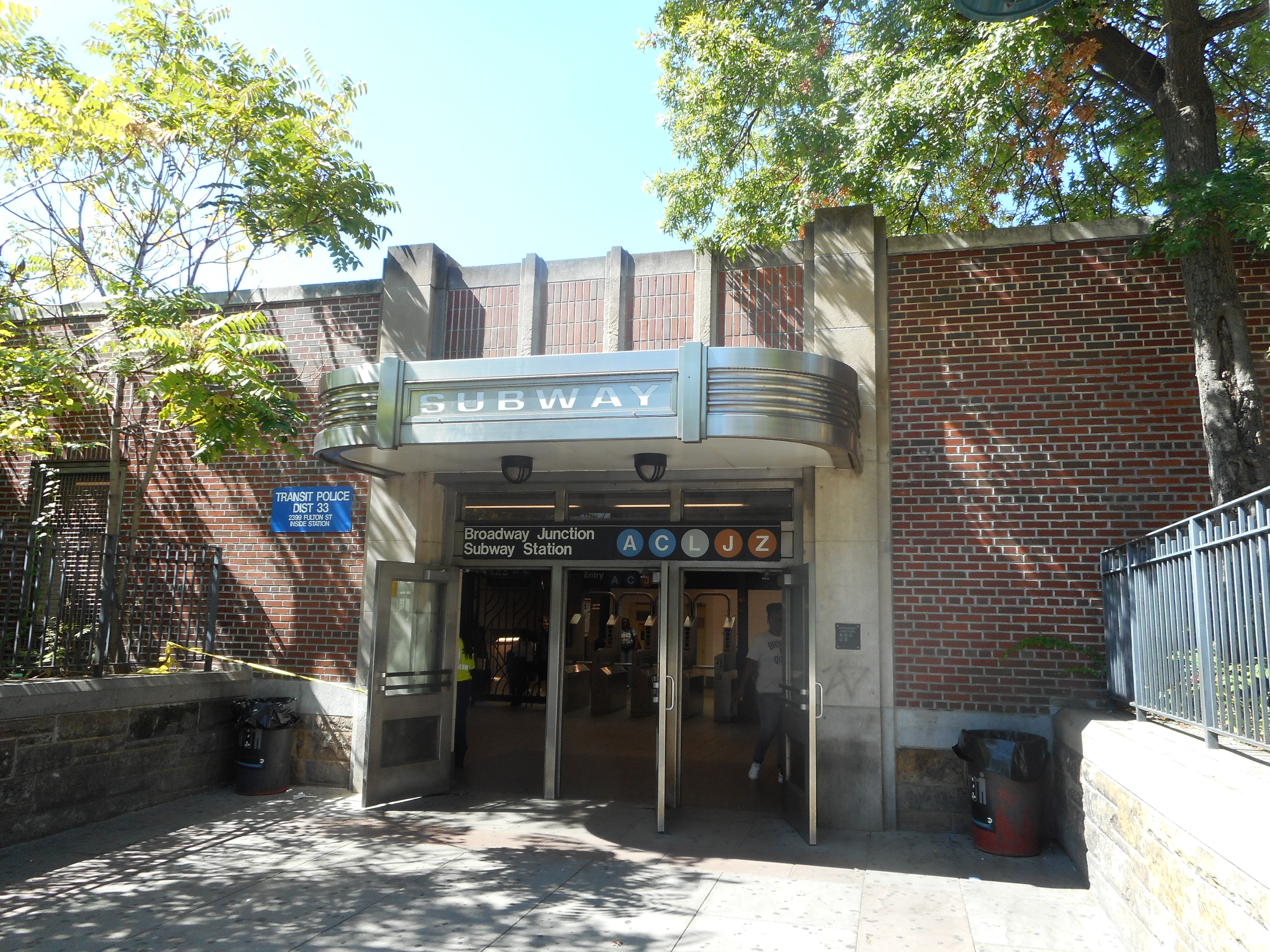
Street entrance with an overhang that combined Art Deco and mid-century modern elements

The fare control area is in the station house, with a token booth and turnstile banks. The structure was built along with the IND station. The station house leads to Van Sinderen Avenue between Fulton Street to the south, and Truxton Street and Broadway to the north. This is the only entrance to the entire complex. There is also a police precinct located in the station house, New York City Police Department (NYPD) Transit Police District 33, at the south end of the building. The station was previously part of Transit Police District 23. The station house is adjacent to Callahan-Kelly Playground, and is recessed a short distance west from Van Sinderen Avenue.

A ventilation structure for the IND line sits at the west end of the park at Sackman Street. There have been planning studies to build a new entrance in this area.

== BMT Canarsie Line platforms ==
Broadway Junction
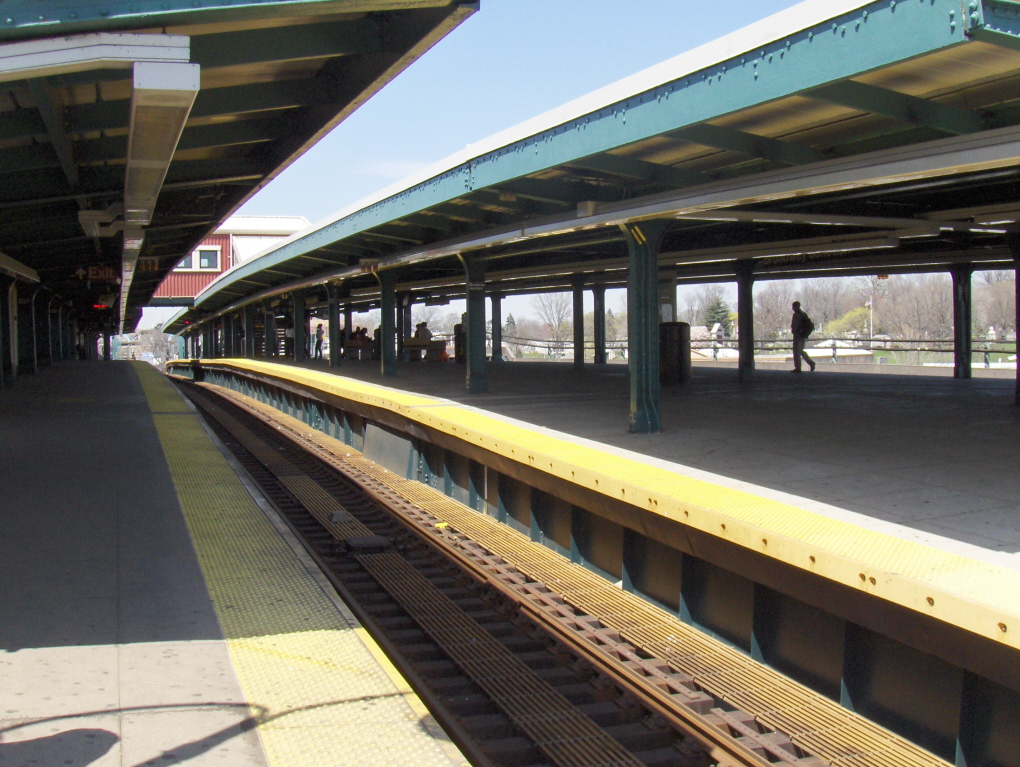
- Southbound side platform for the L train; with northbound island platform

Station statistics
- Division: B (BMT)
- Line: BMT Canarsie Line
- Services: L (all times)
- Structure: Elevated
- Platforms: 1 island platform 1 side platform (southbound only)
- Tracks: 2

Other information
- Opened: July 14, 1928; 98 years ago
- Accessible: No; under construction
Services
Preceding station	New York City Subway	Following station
Bushwick Avenue–Aberdeen Street toward Eighth Avenue	L (New York City Subway service)	Atlantic Avenue toward Canarsie–Rockaway Parkway
Track layout
Station service legend
Symbol	Description
Stops all times	Stops all times

The Broadway Junction station on the BMT Canarsie Line, served by the L train at all times, has two tracks, one island platform and one side platform. Manhattan-bound trains use the island platform for northbound service while Canarsie-bound trains use the side platform for southbound service, similar to the configuration of the Bowling Green station on the IRT Lexington Avenue Line. However, unlike Bowling Green, the southbound trains can use the island platform if necessary. The station is between Bushwick Avenue–Aberdeen Street to the north and Atlantic Avenue to the south.

This station opened on July 14, 1928, as the final section of the 14th Street–Eastern District Line, now part of the Canarsie Line, opened between Montrose Avenue and Broadway Junction. This new line allowed trains from Canarsie to run via the 14th Street Line in Manhattan in addition to the Nassau Street Line. The station is one of the highest elevated platforms in the city, sitting above the already-elevated BMT Jamaica Line. As high as this station platform is, it plunges abruptly into a tunnel at the north end. This end of the station slopes sharply downward, and the platform end is about 200 yards (180 m) away from the tunnel's portal. A diamond crossover was installed here between 1998 and 2001.

The south end of the northbound platform divides into two, with a central gap between the two legs. Two normally-unused tracks connect the Canarsie and Jamaica lines. The southbound track can be seen emerging beneath the two legs of the northbound platform; the northbound flyover with its severe curve can be seen just east of the station, beginning near the signal tower. During 1999, this station underwent a series of renovations, including new canopies, a new crossover (known as "The Barn" because of its rustic red siding and white trim), and the removal of a hazardous crossunder. The old-style platform lights were removed and replaced with light fixtures that curve upward and split into two lights, widely seen elsewhere in the system. In March 2018, in preparation for the L train shutdown, the MTA announced that it would be installing two extra staircases to the BMT Canarsie Line platforms; at the time, there was only one passageway to each platform.

== BMT Jamaica Line platforms ==
Broadway Junction
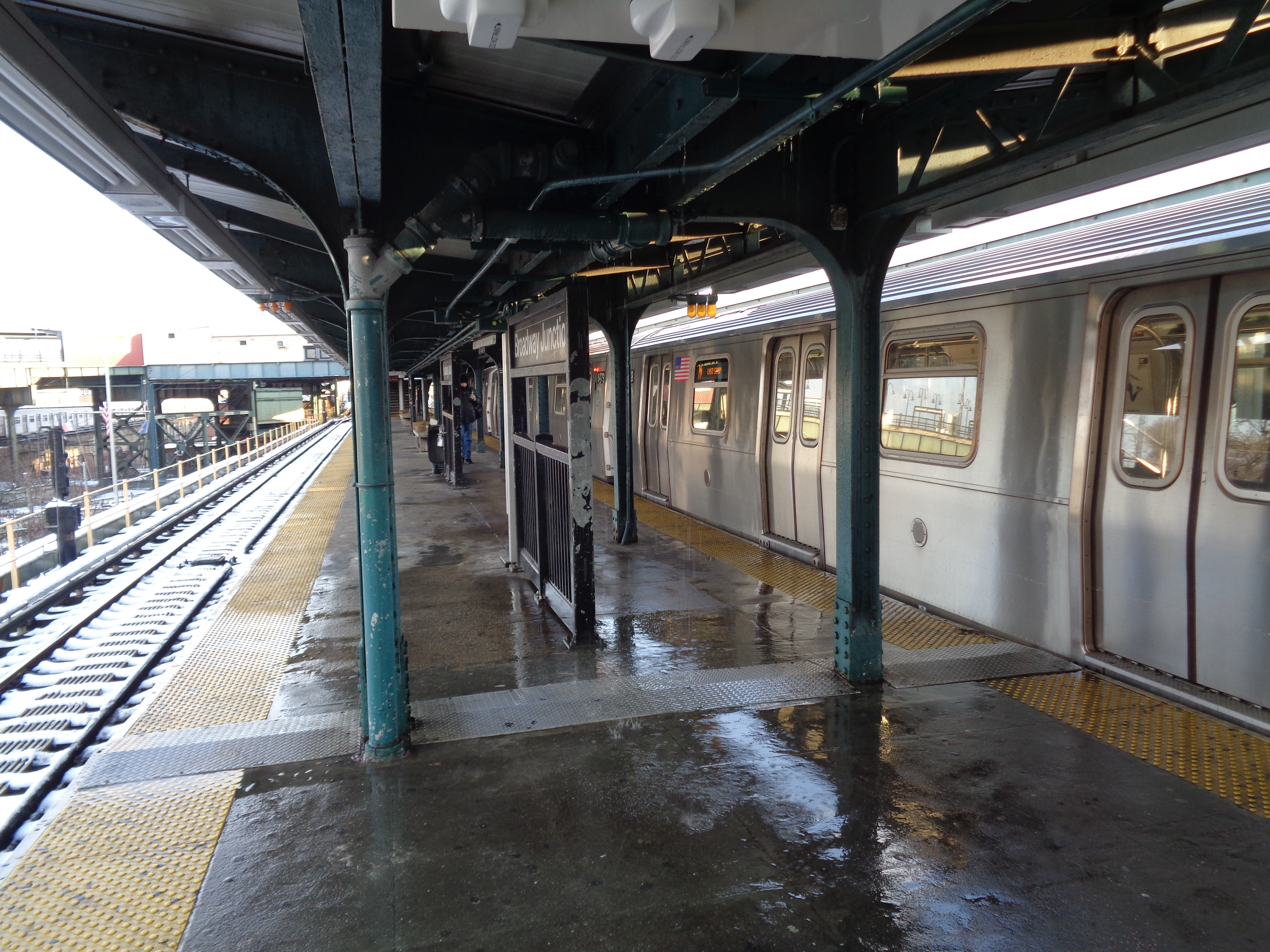
- Westbound platform

Station statistics
- Division: B (BMT)
- Line: BMT Jamaica Line
- Services: J (all except rush hours, peak direction); Z (rush hours, peak direction)
- Structure: Elevated
- Platforms: 2 island platforms cross-platform interchange
- Tracks: 3

Other information
- Opened: June 14, 1885; 141 years ago August 5, 1919; 107 years ago (current elevated station)
- Accessible: No; under construction
- Former/other names: Manhattan Junction (1885–1919); Eastern Parkway (1919–2003)
Services
Preceding station	New York City Subway	Following station
Chauncey Street J Z toward Broad Street	J/Z (New York City Subway service)	Alabama Avenue J Z toward Jamaica Center–York College
Chauncey Street J Z toward Broad Street	J/Z (New York City Subway service)	Alabama Avenue J Z toward Jamaica Center–York College
Halsey Street J skip-stop	J/Z (New York City Subway service)	Alabama Avenue J Z toward Jamaica Center–York College
Non-revenue services and lines
Preceding station	New York City Subway	Following station
Myrtle Avenue express	no service	Atlantic Avenue Canarsie
Track layout
Station service legend
Symbol	Description
Stops all times except rush hours in the peak direction	Stops all times except rush hours in the peak direction
Stops rush hours in the peak direction only	Stops rush hours in the peak direction only
Stops all times	Stops all times
Stops all times except late nights	Stops all times except late nights

The Broadway Junction station is an express station on the BMT Jamaica Line that has three tracks and two island platforms. The station is served by the J at all times and by the Z only during rush hours in the peak direction; both routes run on the outer two local tracks. The next stop to the east (railroad north) is Alabama Avenue for all service; the next stop to the west (railroad south) is Chauncey Street for skip-stop Z trains and local J trains, and Halsey Street for skip-stop J trains. The middle express track is not used by regular service. At each end of the station are track connections to the East New York Yard. Trains that run to or from that yard can terminate or begin at this station.

The station was originally called Eastern Parkway station, named for its original exit on the extreme west end of the platforms. This entrance is now closed, though the street stairs and station house are still present, now being used as employee space. A second fare control area, a mezzanine, at Conway Street in the middle of the platforms was also closed, and was removed in the 2000s as part of the station's renovation. The ironwork for the old Fulton Elevated trackways can be seen under this portion of the complex from the platforms. Three staircases from each platform lead to the upper mezzanine of the complex. The mezzanine is above the platforms and connects to the Canarsie Line and to the exit at street level via two long escalators. At street level, there is a transfer to the underground IND Fulton Street Line and the fare control area.

As part of the 2015–2019 Metropolitan Transportation Authority's Capital Program, station capacity enhancements were made at the station. The project involved the building of two additional staircases from each platform to the mezzanine to reduce platform congestion. Design work started in February 2017, and was finished in August 2017. The project was being bid on as of January 2018, work began in July 2018, and the new staircases were finished around October 2018.

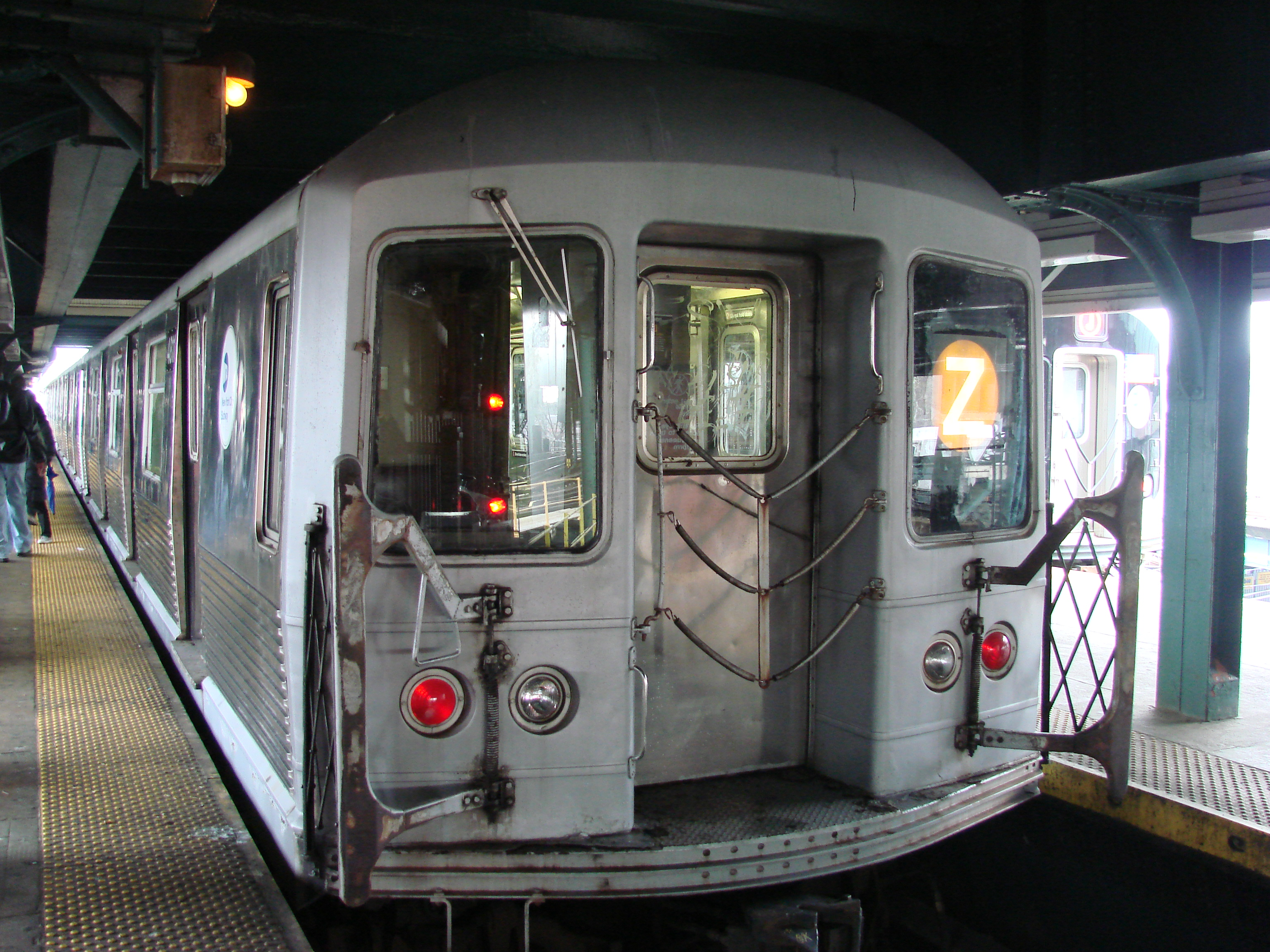
A train of R42 cars in Z service at the station

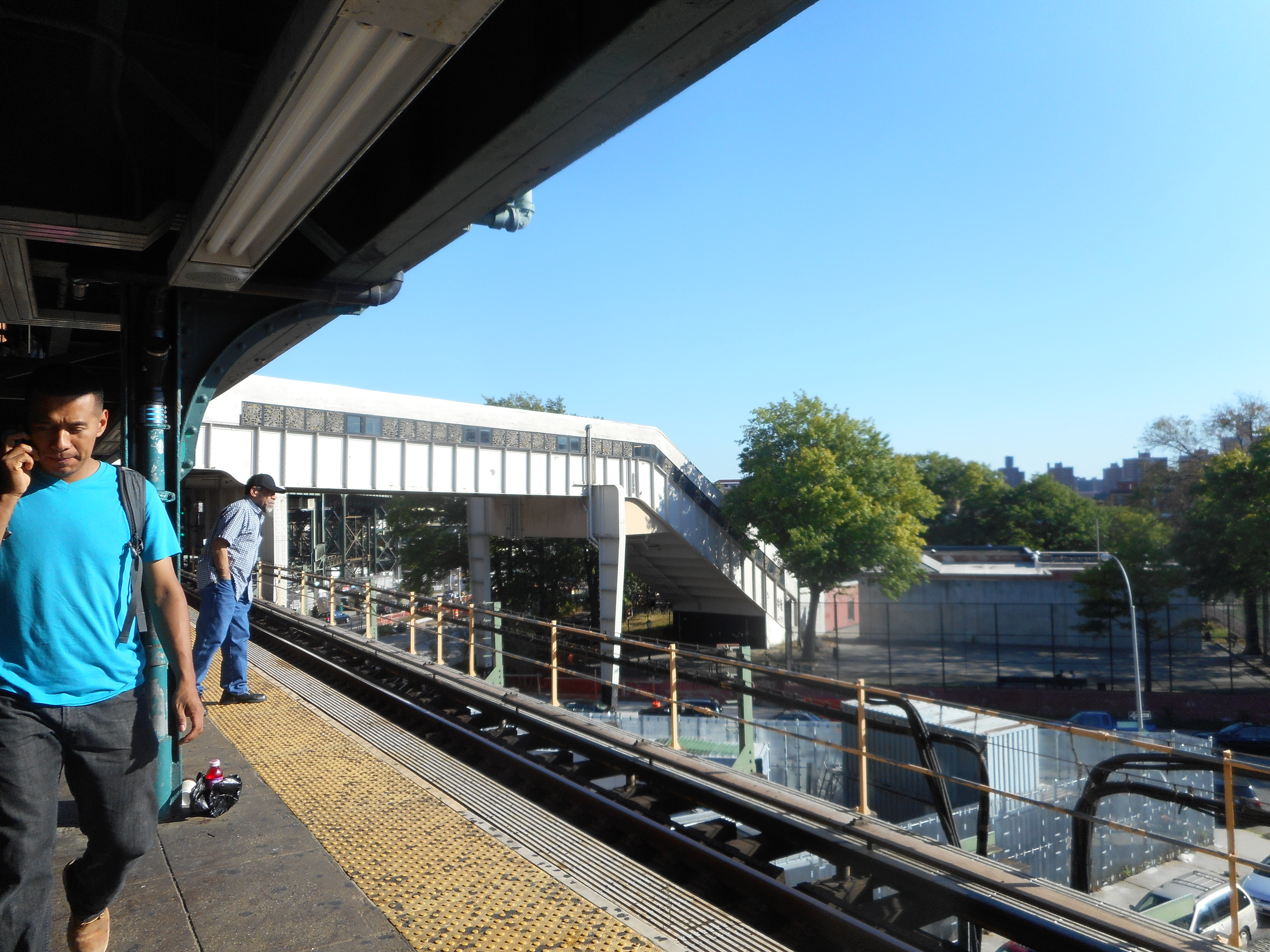
The bridge between the Jamaica platforms and Fulton Street subway

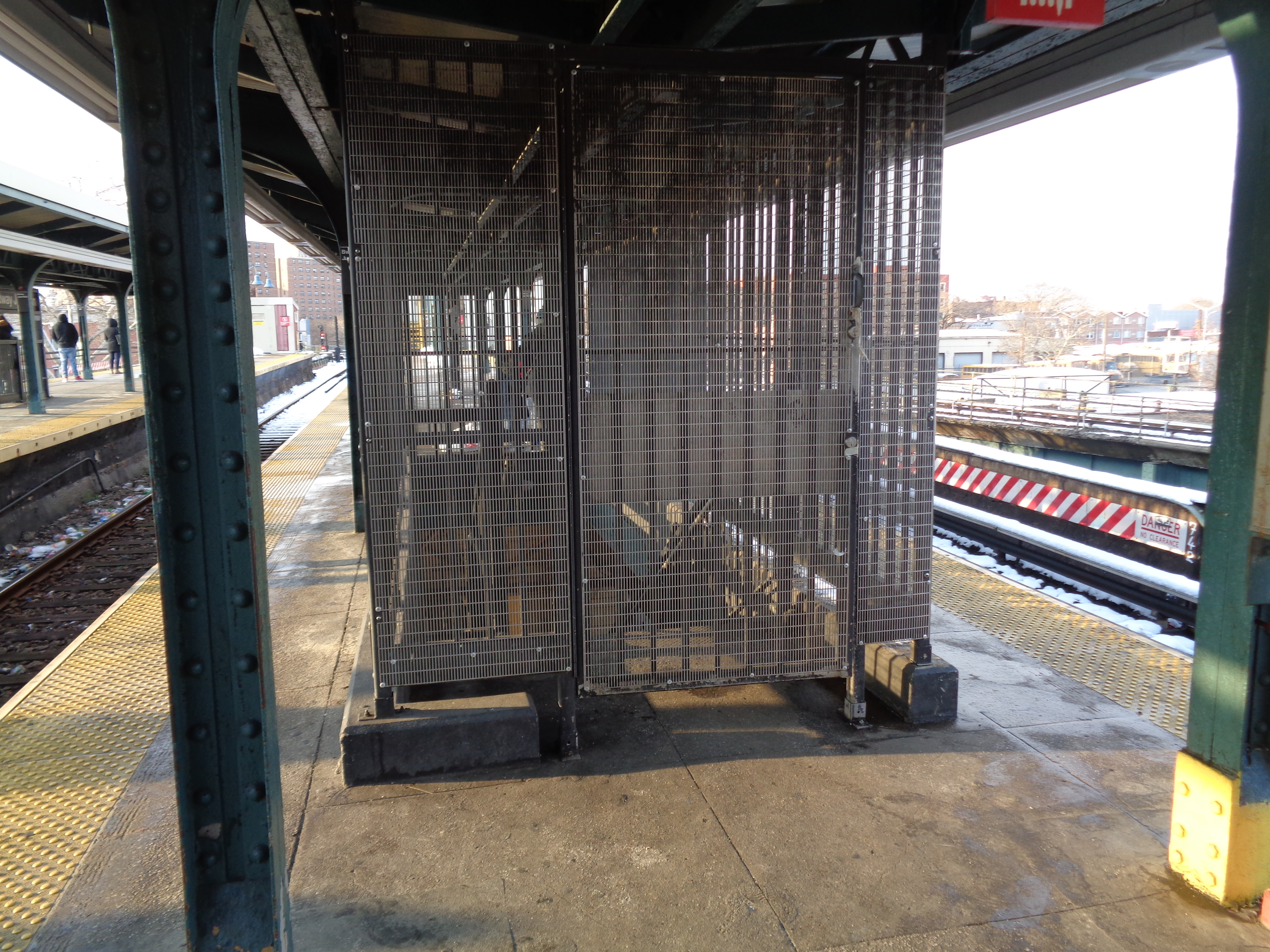
A closed staircase to the former station house at Eastern Parkway

== IND Fulton Street Line platforms ==
Broadway Junction
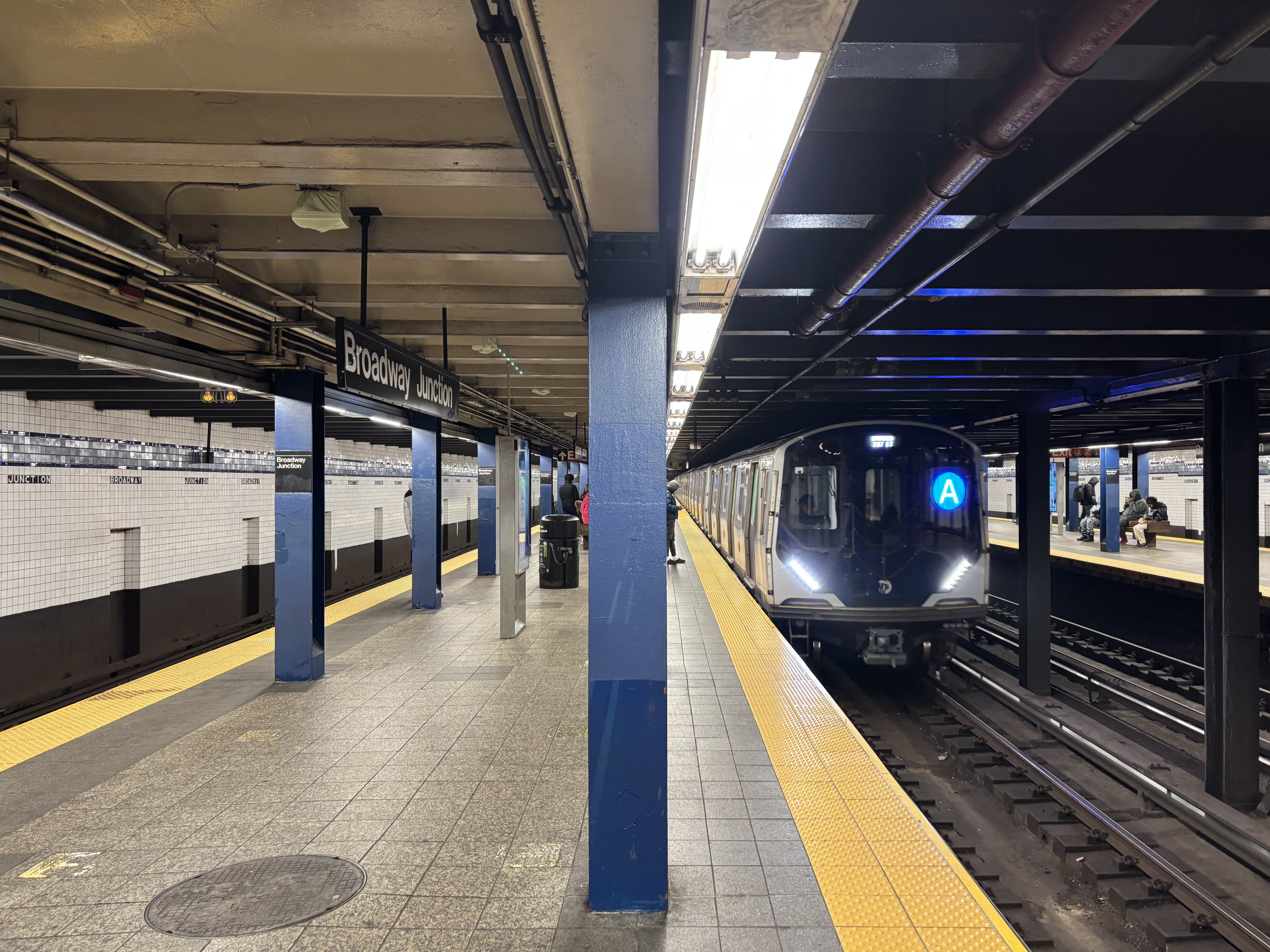
- R211A A train arriving at the northbound platform

Station statistics
- Division: B (IND)
- Line: IND Fulton Street Line
- Services: A (all times); C (all except late nights)
- Structure: Underground
- Platforms: 2 island platforms cross-platform interchange
- Tracks: 4

Other information
- Opened: December 30, 1946; 79 years ago
- Accessible: No; under construction
- Accessibility: Cross-platform transfer available
- Former/other names: Broadway – East New York (1946–2003)
Services
Preceding station	New York City Subway	Following station
Utica Avenue A toward Inwood–207th Street	Express	Euclid Avenue A toward Far Rockaway–Mott Avenue or Ozone Park–Lefferts Boulevard
Rockaway Avenue A C toward 168th Street	Local	Liberty Avenue A C toward Euclid Avenue
Track layout
Station service legend
Symbol	Description
Stops all times except late nights	Stops all times except late nights
Stops all times	Stops all times

The Broadway Junction station on the IND Fulton Street Line, formerly called the Broadway–East New York station, is a standard express station with four tracks and two island platforms. The station is served by the A at all times and by the C except at night. The A runs express during the day and local during the night, while the C always runs local. The next stop to the west (railroad north) is Rockaway Avenue for local trains and Utica Avenue for express trains; the next stop to the east (railroad south) is Liberty Avenue for local trains and Euclid Avenue for express trains.

The land for the station was acquired by the city in 1938, and in order to construct the station and other utilities, the land had to be cleared of buildings. Some of the land was given to the New York City Parks Department in 1945 for the construction of Callahan-Kelly Playground, which was named after two local soldiers who died during World War I. The station was nearly complete when the United States' entrance into World War II in 1941 halted construction due to material shortages. Work resumed following the war to install the necessary signals, tracks and complete the escalators to the BMT platforms. The contract for the 43-foot (13 m) escalator was awarded on November 7, 1945, to the Otis Elevator Company. The station opened on December 30, 1946, while the escalator was completed on July 1, 1948, after supply delays. In the early 1950s, the platforms were extended to 660 feet (200 m) to accommodate 11-car trains.

The station's tile band is unique in that it incorporates two types of tile–gloss and matte–in contrasting shades of cobalt blue (gloss border) and blueberry (matte center). When the station was renamed in 2003, the "EAST NY" tiles on the wall were removed and replaced by tiles reading "JUNCTION", in a very closely matching IND font. There is an active control tower just past the head end of the Queens-bound platform.

East of the station, the tunnel widens on both sides to accommodate an additional trackway diverging from the local tracks. These bellmouths, one of which has an emergency exit, were built for a proposed extension along the BMT Jamaica Line, or for a proposed Jamaica Avenue Subway. They were not a provision for the IND Second System, as were similar structures on other IND lines, but rather date from an earlier plan for the IND Fulton Street Line, which would have connected the IND tracks west of the station to two lines to the east of the station: the BMT Jamaica Line tracks, and the BMT Fulton Street Line tracks to Lefferts Boulevard, which were eventually connected to the IND Fulton Street Line anyway, albeit past Grant Avenue.

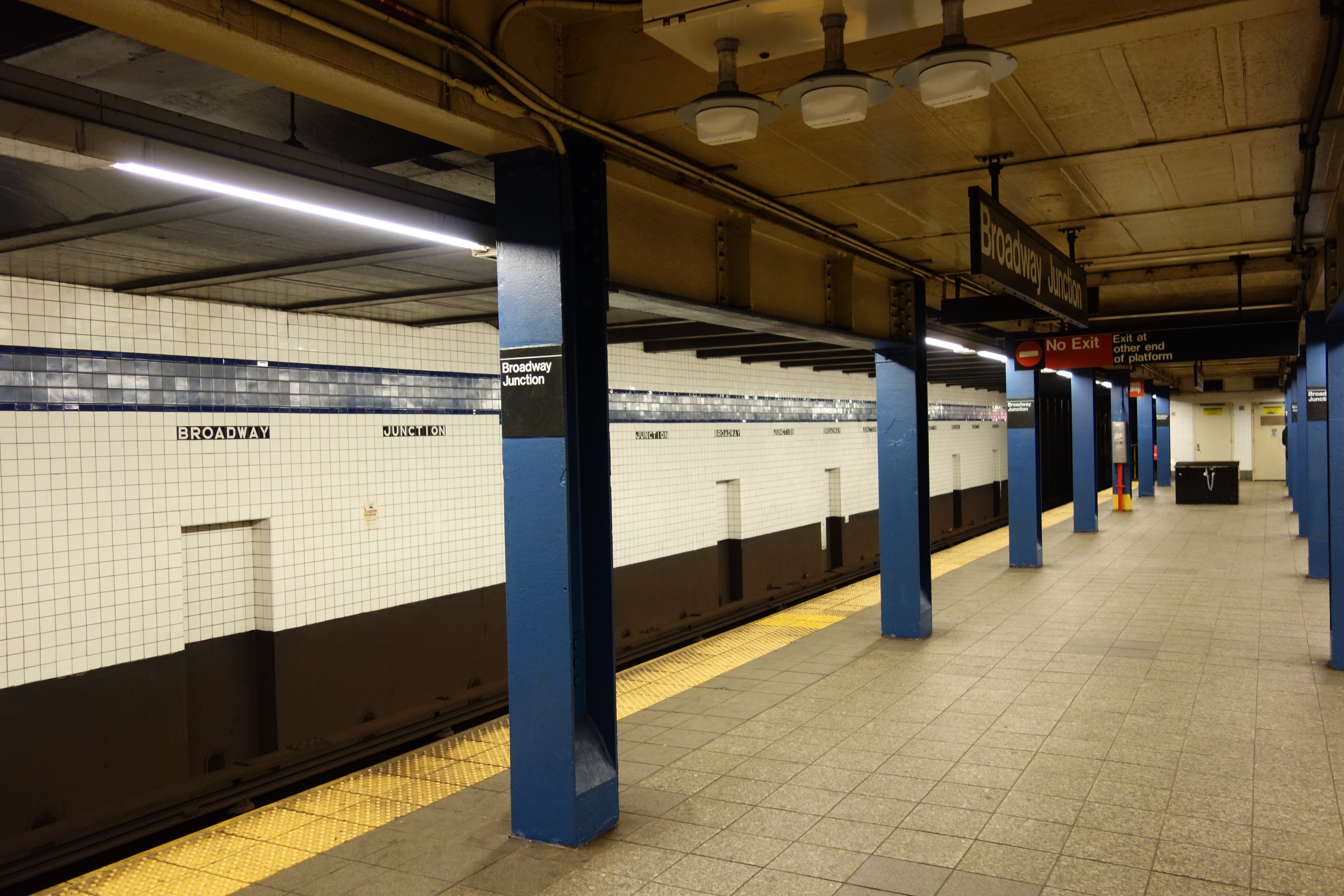
The southbound platform

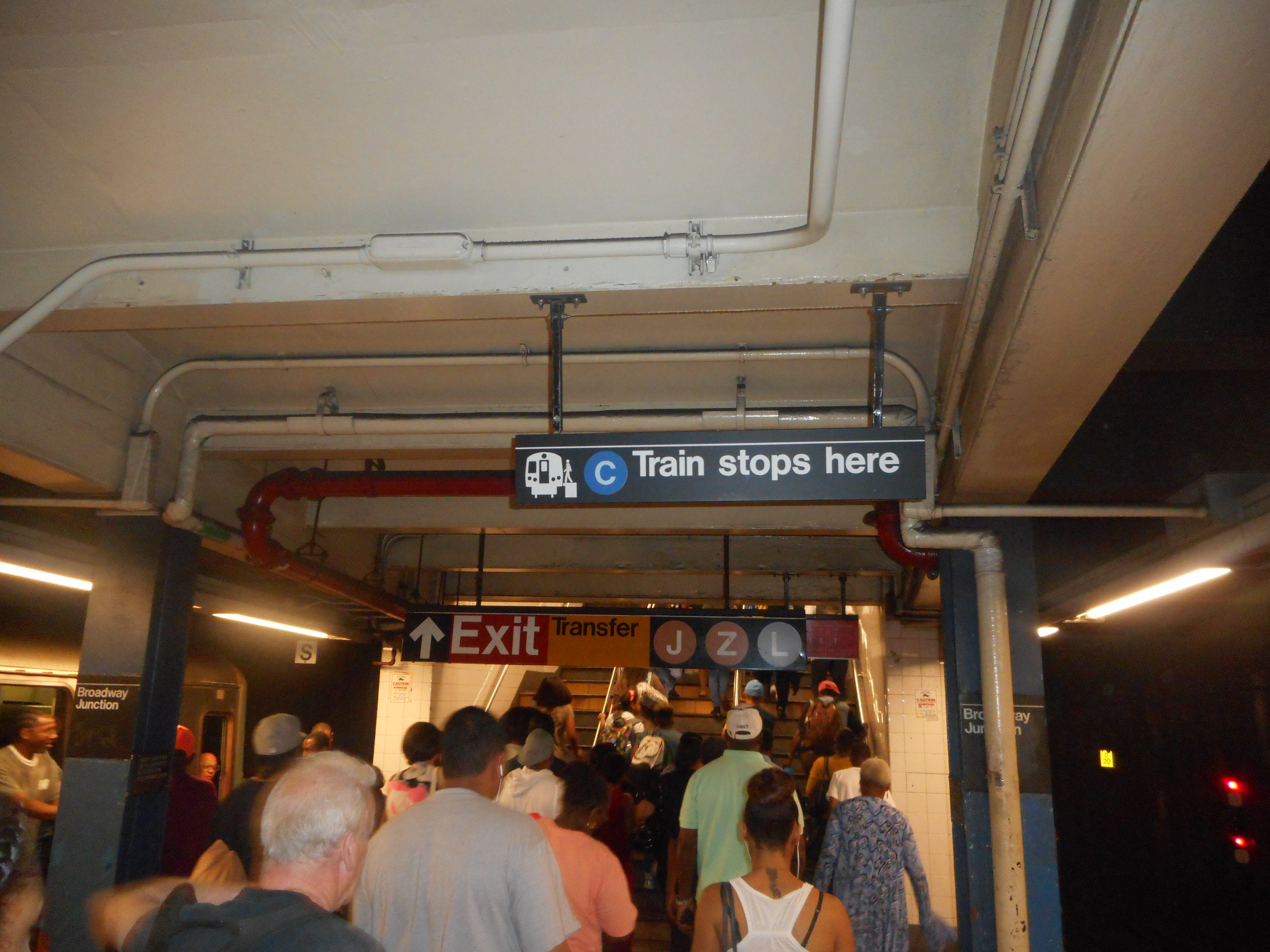
C train stop sign in front of a staircase to the station house

== BMT Fulton Street Line platforms ==
Manhattan Junction
- Former New York City Subway station

Station statistics
- Division: B (BMT)
- Line: BMT Fulton Street Line (formerly)
- Services: None (demolished)
- Structure: Elevated
- Platforms: 1 island platform 1 side platform (for East New York Loop)
- Tracks: 2

Other information
- Opened: July 4, 1889; 137 years ago
- Closed: April 26, 1956; 70 years ago

Station succession
- Next west: Rockaway Avenue
- Next east: Atlantic Avenue
Station service legend
Symbol	Description
Stops all times	Stops in station at all times
Stops all times except late nights	Stops all times except late nights
Stops late nights only	Stops late nights only
Stops late nights and weekends	Stops late nights and weekends only
Stops weekdays during the day	Stops weekdays during the day
Stops weekends during the day	Stops weekends during the day
Stops all times except rush hours in the peak direction	Stops all times except rush hours in the peak direction
Stops all times except weekdays in the peak direction	Stops all times except weekdays in the peak direction
Stops daily except rush hours in the peak direction	Stops all times except nights and rush hours in the peak direction
Stops rush hours only	Stops rush hours only
Stops rush hours in the peak direction only	Stops rush hours in the peak direction only
Station closed	Station is closed
(Details about time periods)

Manhattan Junction was the original name for the Fulton Street Elevated platforms. It was located above Fulton and Sackman Streets, and was the second station to be built in the area of Broadway Junction. The station was built by the Kings County Elevated Railway on July 4, 1889. Manhattan Junction station had an island platform and two tracks, with a spur leading to the East New York Yard, as well as a side platform on the north side of the station that turned north along the East New York Loop, and ended on the south side of the BMT Jamaica Line platforms. The line was originally double tracked; a third track was added in the mid-1910s as part of the Dual Contracts expansion of the line between Nostrand Avenue and Hinsdale Street. The Dual Contracts work reconfigured the Broadway Junction station (then called Manhattan Junction), including removal of the Fulton Street Line platforms.

In 1938, the Independent Subway System began constructing their own Fulton Street Subway and added an underground subway station named Broadway–East New York station. Stations west of this point were being made obsolete as many were being replaced by the subway stations. The subway station opened in December 1946, and all stations east of Rockaway Avenue closed. The ironwork for the old Fulton Elevated trackways can still be found over Fulton Street between Van Sinderen Avenue and Williams Place, and can be seen under this portion of the complex from the Canarsie Line platforms. The severed connection between the station and the East New York Yard can also be seen below the Canarsie Line and above the north side of Fulton Street.

== Ridership ==
In 2016, the station had 3,085,401 boardings, making it the 166th most used station in the 422-station system. This amounted to an average of 9,189 passengers per weekday. In 2017, The New York Times wrote that 100,000 daily passengers used the station per day, meaning that the vast majority of passengers used the station to make transfers to other routes. By 2019, annual ridership had declined to 2,759,349 boardings, making Broadway Junction the 177th most-used station in the 423-station system. This amounted to an average of 7,813 passengers per weekday. Due to the COVID-19 pandemic in New York City, ridership dropped drastically in 2020, with only 1,292,868 passengers entering the station that year.
