= Halsey Street station (BMT Jamaica Line) =

New York City Subway station in Brooklyn

Halsey Street
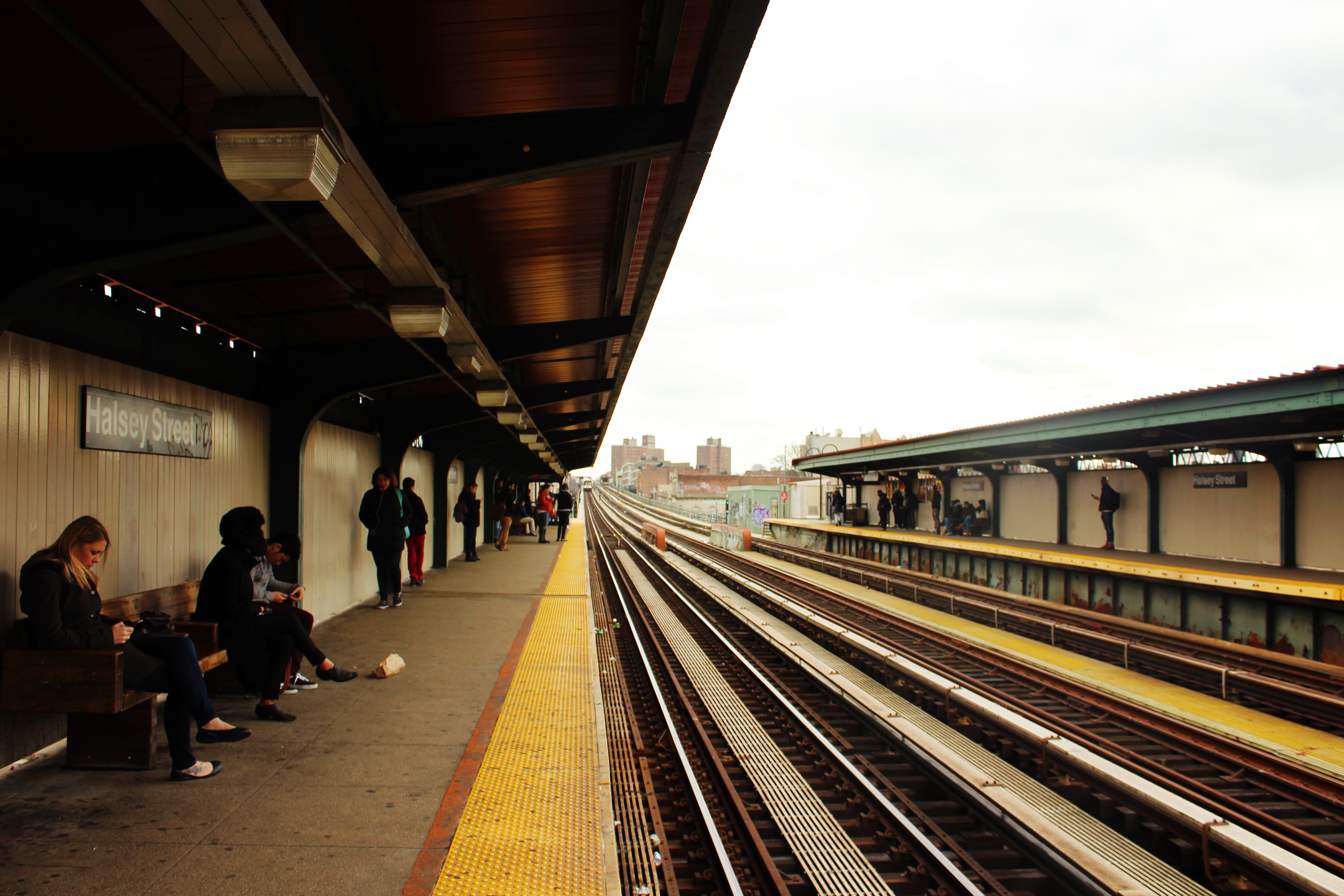
- View from southbound platform

Station statistics
- Address: Halsey Street & Broadway; Brooklyn, New York
- Borough: Brooklyn
- Locale: Bedford–Stuyvesant, Bushwick
- Coordinates: 40.685682°N 73.915458°W
- Division: B (BMT)
- Line: BMT Jamaica Line
- Services: J (all times)
- Transit: NYCT Bus: B7, B26, Q24
- Structure: Elevated
- Platforms: 2 side platforms
- Tracks: 3 (2 in regular service)

Other information
- Opened: August 19, 1885; 141 years ago

Traffic
- 2025: 1,452,198 ▲18.4%
- Rank: 234 out of 423
Services
Preceding station	New York City Subway	Following station
Kosciuszko Street J skip-stop	J/Z (New York City Subway service)	Broadway Junction J skip-stop
Gates Avenue J toward Broad Street	J/Z (New York City Subway service)	Chauncey Street J toward Jamaica Center–York College
does not stop here
Location
Location within New York City Subway
Location within New York City
Location within New York
Track layout
Street map
Station service legend
Symbol	Description
Stops all times except rush hours in the peak direction	Stops all times except rush hours in the peak direction
Stops rush hours in the peak direction only	Stops rush hours in the peak direction only
Stops all times	Stops all times
Stops all times except late nights	Stops all times except late nights

The Halsey Street station is a local station on the BMT Jamaica Line of the New York City Subway. Located at Halsey Street and Broadway at the border of Bedford–Stuyvesant and Bushwick, Brooklyn, it is served by the J train at all times. The Z train skips this station when it operates.

== Station layout ==
This elevated station, opened on August 19, 1885, has two side platforms and three tracks; the center express track is not used in regular service. Both platforms have beige windscreens and green canopies and support columns with red roofs along the entire length except for a small section at either end, where they have high mesh fences instead. The station signs are in the black name plates in white Helvetica lettering.

The 2008 artwork here is called SOL'SCRYPT by SOL'SAX. It consists of glass mosaic panels on the platform windscreens and station house depicting various images of African-American heritage.

=== Exits ===
The station has exits on both the west (railroad north) end and the east (railroad south) end of its platforms.

On the east end, each platform has a single staircase leading to an elevated station house beneath the tracks. It has a turnstile bank and token booth. Outside fare control, two staircases lead to both western corners of Halsey Street and Broadway.

The western exits are now emergency exits leading to both eastern corners of Jefferson Avenue and Broadway. These exits were closed in the 1980s due to high crime. There is a closed station house around the intermediate level of the staircases.
