= East New York Loop =

Former New York City rapid transit line

The East New York Loop was a short rapid transit structure in the East New York neighborhood of Brooklyn, New York City, connecting the Fulton Street Elevated and Broadway Elevated, and its associated service patterns. The changes were unpopular with residents and soon undone; the loop was later used to connect the Canarsie Line to the Broadway Elevated. As part of the Dual Contracts, the loop was torn down and replaced by the multi-level Broadway Junction.

== Layout ==
The Loop complex consisted of an at-grade grand union junction (configured as two doubled wyes) providing all possible connections between the Broadway Elevated and the Fulton Street Elevated, with a single curved platform along the Cypress Hills-bound Broadway Line, Park Row-bound Fulton Street Line, and the track for Cypress Hills-bound Broadway trains to switch to the Park Row-bound Fulton Street line, as well as an island platform on the Fulton Street line and a side platform on the Broadway Ferry-bound Broadway line.

== History ==
The Brooklyn Rapid Transit Company acquired the Broadway Elevated (Brooklyn Union Elevated Railroad) on March 25, 1899, and the Fulton Street Elevated (Kings County Elevated Railway) on July 6, 1899. Plans were soon made for a connection at East New York, where the two lines came within a block of each other. Free transfers would be implemented between the elevated and surface lines here. The electrified loop opened on August 8, 1900, and immediately received complaints because of a forced transfer at the loop to shuttle trains or surface cars to continue beyond East New York during off-peak hours. The new service pattern was blamed for poor school attendance. The Loop service was discontinued prior to 1906, though the structure remained until the reconfiguration under the Dual Contracts.
