= Canarsie–Rockaway Parkway station =

New York City Subway station in Brooklyn

Canarsie–Rockaway Parkway
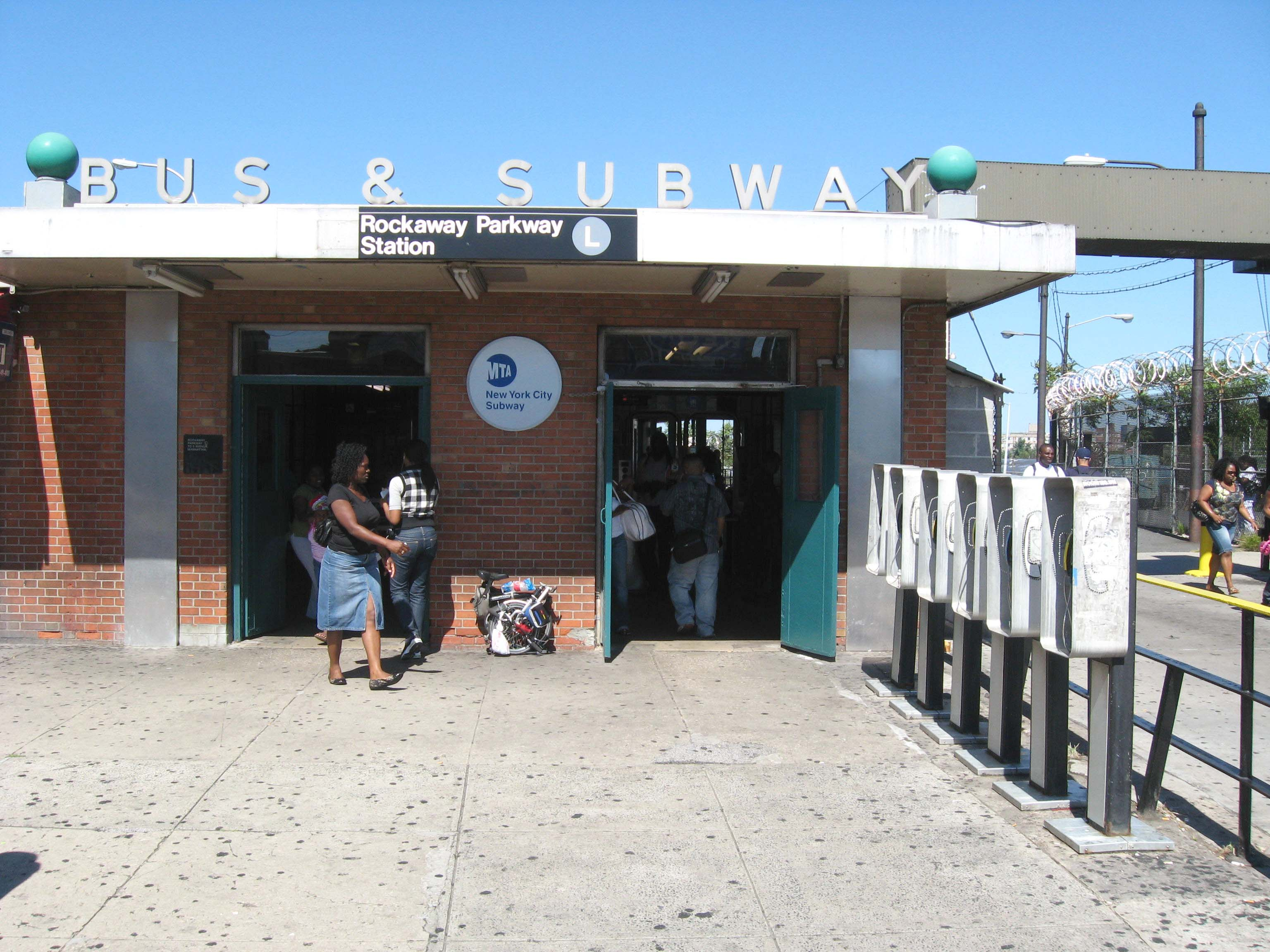

Station statistics
- Address: Rockaway Parkway & Glenwood Road; Brooklyn, New York
- Borough: Brooklyn
- Locale: Canarsie
- Coordinates: 40.645382°N 73.902626°W
- Division: B (BMT)
- Line: BMT Canarsie Line
- Services: L (all times)
- Transit: NYCT Bus: B6, B17, B42, B60, B82, B82 SBS: B42 and westbound B6 and B82 (Local and SBS) buses stop near the station outside subway fare control.
- Structure: At-grade
- Platforms: 1 island platform
- Tracks: 2

Other information
- Opened: July 28, 1906; 120 years ago
- Accessible: Yes

Traffic
- 2025: 2,221,658 ▲180.2%
- Rank: 163 out of 423
Services
Preceding station	New York City Subway	Following station
East 105th Street toward Eighth Avenue	L (New York City Subway service)	Terminus
Location
Location within New York City Subway
Location within New York City
Location within New York
Track layout
Street map
Station service legend
Symbol	Description
Stops all times	Stops all times

The Canarsie–Rockaway Parkway station is the southern terminal station of the BMT Canarsie Line of the New York City Subway, and is one of the few grade-level stations in the system. Located at the intersection of Rockaway Parkway and Glenwood Road in the Canarsie neighborhood of Brooklyn, it is served by the L train at all times.

The Canarsie–Rockaway Parkway station was constructed by Brooklyn Rapid Transit Company (BRT), later Brooklyn–Manhattan Transit Corporation (BMT). It opened on July 28, 1906.

== History ==
=== Construction and opening ===
Before becoming a BRT elevated line in 1906, the Canarsie Line operated as a steam dummy line. It was first owned by the Brooklyn and Rockaway Beach Railroad, chartered December 24, 1863, and opened October 21, 1865, from the Long Island Rail Road in East New York to a pier at Canarsie Landing, very close to the current junction of Rockaway Parkway and the Belt Parkway, where ferries continued on to Rockaway. The line was single-tracked until 1894.

The Canarsie Railroad was chartered on May 8, 1906, as a BRT subsidiary (leased to the Brooklyn Union Elevated Railroad) and acquired the line on May 31, 1906. The line was partly elevated, and electrified with third rail on the elevated part and trolley wire on the rest, south of New Lots Avenue. The Long Island Rail Road, which had used the line north of New Lots to access their Bay Ridge Branch, built a new line just to the west. The East New York terminus was extended several blocks along a section of line formerly used for "East New York Loop" service to the Fulton Street Elevated and the Broadway Elevated (now the BMT Jamaica Line), at a point known as Manhattan Junction (now Broadway Junction).

Canarsie–Rockaway Parkway opened on July 28, 1906, as the terminal of a service that ran on the Canarsie and Jamaica lines to Broadway Ferry station in Williamsburg.

=== Renovations ===
Because it is at street level, the station is accessible as part of the Americans with Disabilities Act of 1990. However, the station was still missing some key ADA elements; subsequently, as part of the 2015–2019 MTA Capital Program, the station was to be upgraded with several ADA improvements. For $5.48 million, the station agent booths were relocated, platforms had boarding areas extended and retrofitted with warning strips and rubbing boards, the platform gaps were reduced, and a new ADA compliant ramp was installed, along with other modifications. A $21.2 million contract for ADA upgrades and a renovation of the adjacent bus terminal was awarded in late 2018. The project was completed by July 2020.

The MTA announced in 2025 that a customer service center would open at the station.

== Station layout ==
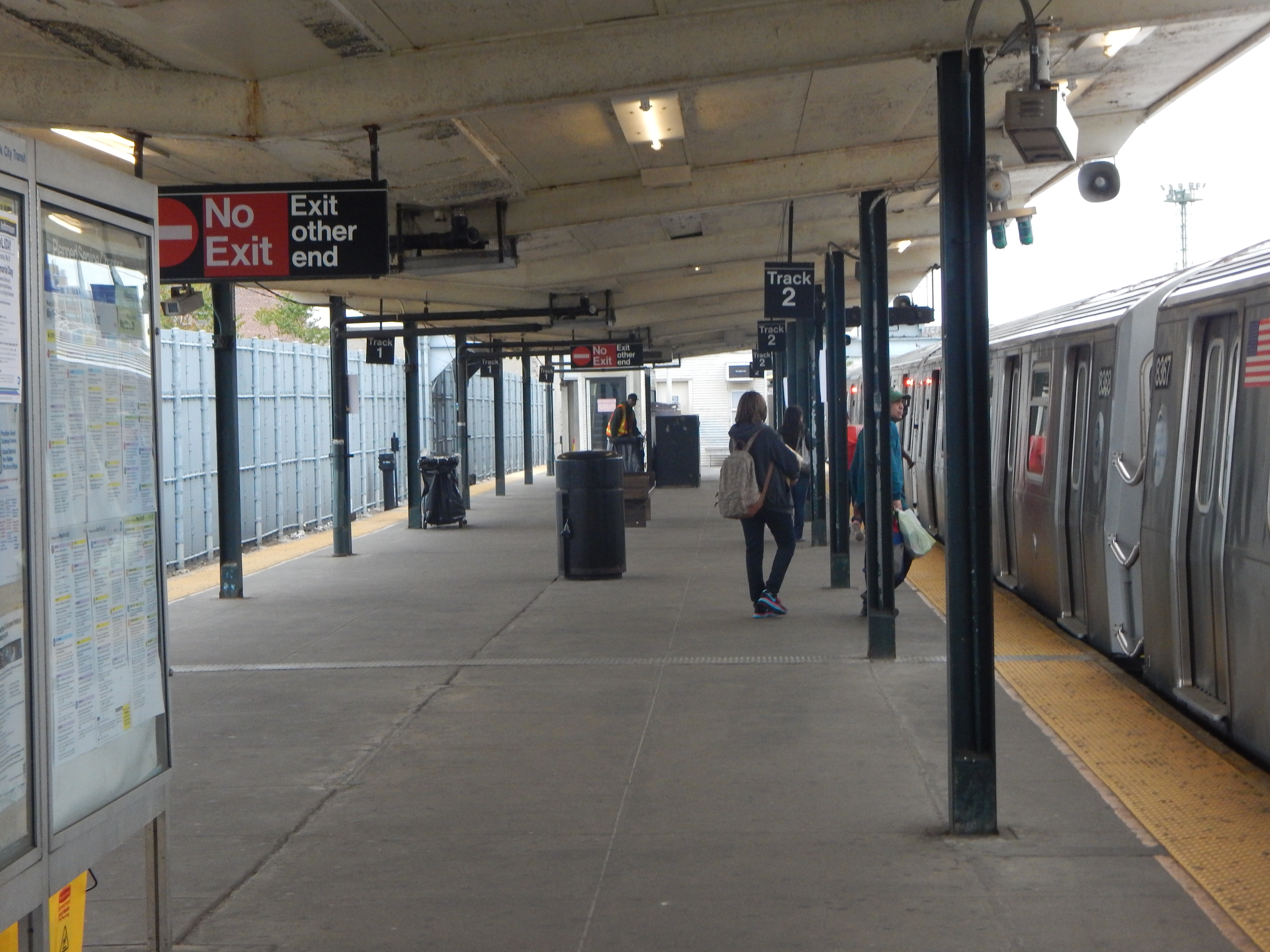
Platform view at Canarsie–Rockaway Parkway, with an R160A L train at right

This grade level station has two tracks and a single island platform. The two tracks end at offset bumper blocks at the south end of the station; track 2, the track east of the island platform, is slightly shorter than track 1 to the west because of the diagonal alignment of the station to the street grid. The station is fully ADA-accessible.

Adjacent to the station to the east is the Canarsie Yard.

=== Exits ===
The station's entrance is beyond the bumper blocks at the south end of the platform. It contains a turnstile bank, token booth, and leads to Rockaway Parkway. On the side of the station house opposite the transfer point is a secondary entrance/exit that contains one HEET entry/exit turnstile, one exit-only HEET turnstile, and one emergency gate. This unstaffed entrance/exit leads to a NYCDOT municipal parking lot, located on the north side of the station. This lot was opened by the New York City Transit Authority in 1959, with space for 340 cars. Another set of HEET turnstiles between the north end of the bus loop and Canarsie Yard connected to the platform by a passageway leads to East 98th Street near Glenwood Road.

== Bus transfer ==
Until 2025, this station was the only one in the system with a bus transfer station within fare control. When the rail service to Canarsie Pier along Rockaway Parkway was discontinued, riders were entitled to a free transfer to the replacement trolleys. Rather than issue paper transfers so riders could exit to the street for the trolleys, a loop was built next to the station with a boarding platform. When the trolleys were discontinued in April 1949, the B42 bus replaced them. South of here, poles that supported the overhead trolley wire remain, with street lighting using some of them.

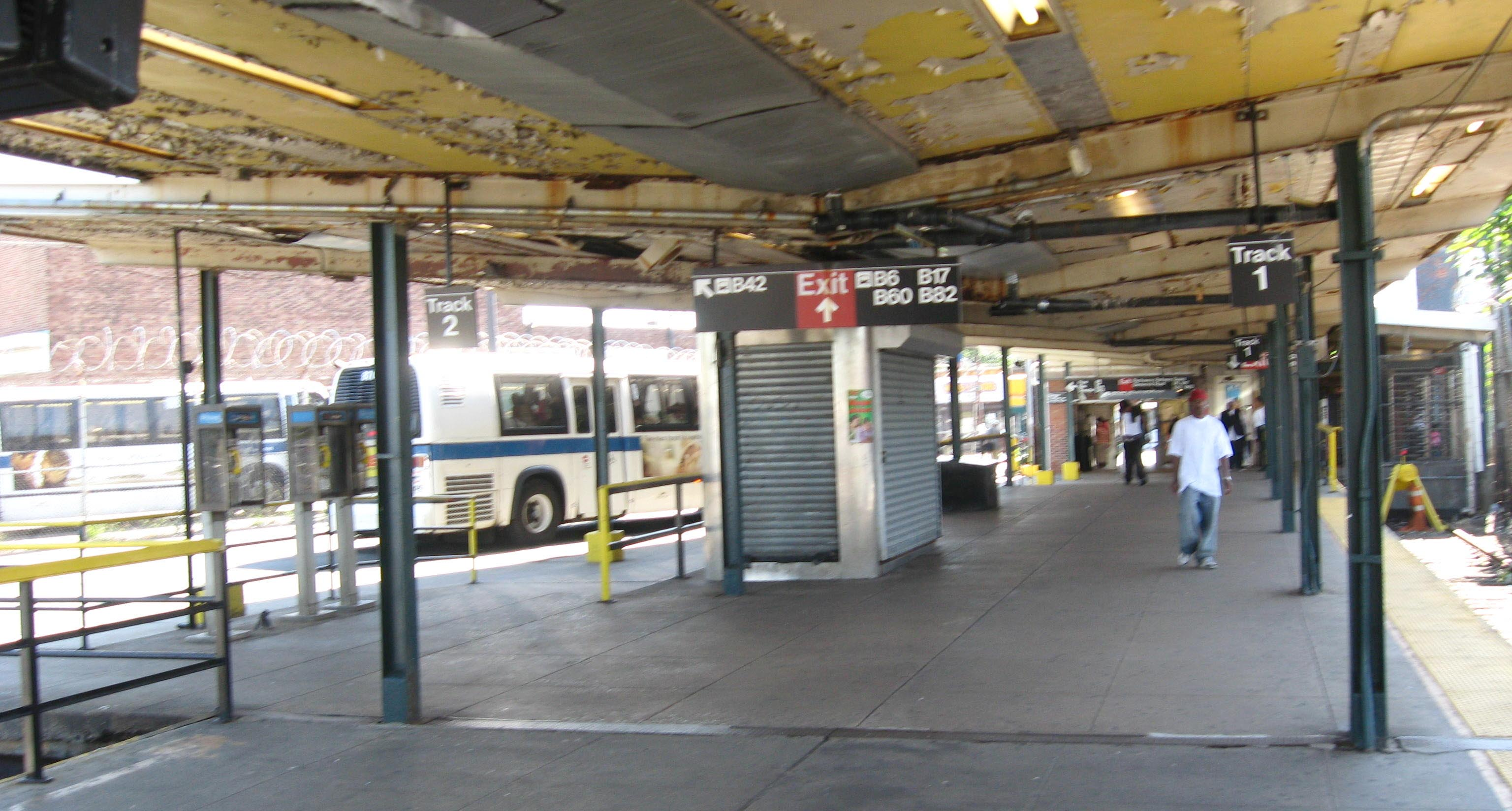
Boarding area for the B42 bus is to the left in 2008. The subway station platform is in the foreground, and the boarding area has since been reconstructed.

Train riders walked directly to the bus loading area without leaving the fare control zone. In turn, bus passengers from Rockaway Parkway entered the subway station without paying an additional fare. At the street, a chain link fence gate blocks access to the bus area to prevent pedestrians from sneaking in for a free ride. The gate is operated by an electric trigger, and was put into operation on December 7, 1960. The back of the bus loop contains an unstaffed entrance to the Rockaway Parkway station that is built on a small shack, has one HEET turnstile, one exit-only turnstile, and one emergency gate, and leads to the northeast corner of Glenwood Road and East 98th Street.

Prior to December 2019, other buses serving the station stopped at the curb and picked up passengers outside fare control on the East 98th Street loop outside the inner loop. A chain link fence had separated the loops. In 2019, the loop was reconfigured, and reopened with 3 bays and one loop:

- Bay 1: all B42 service
- Bay 2: westbound B82 Local and Select Bus service
- Bay 3: westbound B6 Local and Limited service

The B17 and B60, along with eastbound buses on the B6 (excluding trips terminating at Rockaway Parkway) and B82 Local and Select Bus Service routes, continue to stop outside fare control. This reconstruction was done for approximately $2.4 million.

In 2025, due to an increase in fare evasion in the New York City Subway system, fare control gates, high-level fences, and turnstiles were being installed in the area connecting the bus loops to the Canarsie Line platform. However, the transfer remains free for passengers who have already paid their fare on the bus or at another subway station. The gates and high-level fences were completed and the new turnstiles opened to customer service on May 16, 2025.
