= B82 (New York City bus) =

Bus route in Brooklyn, New York

b82 b82
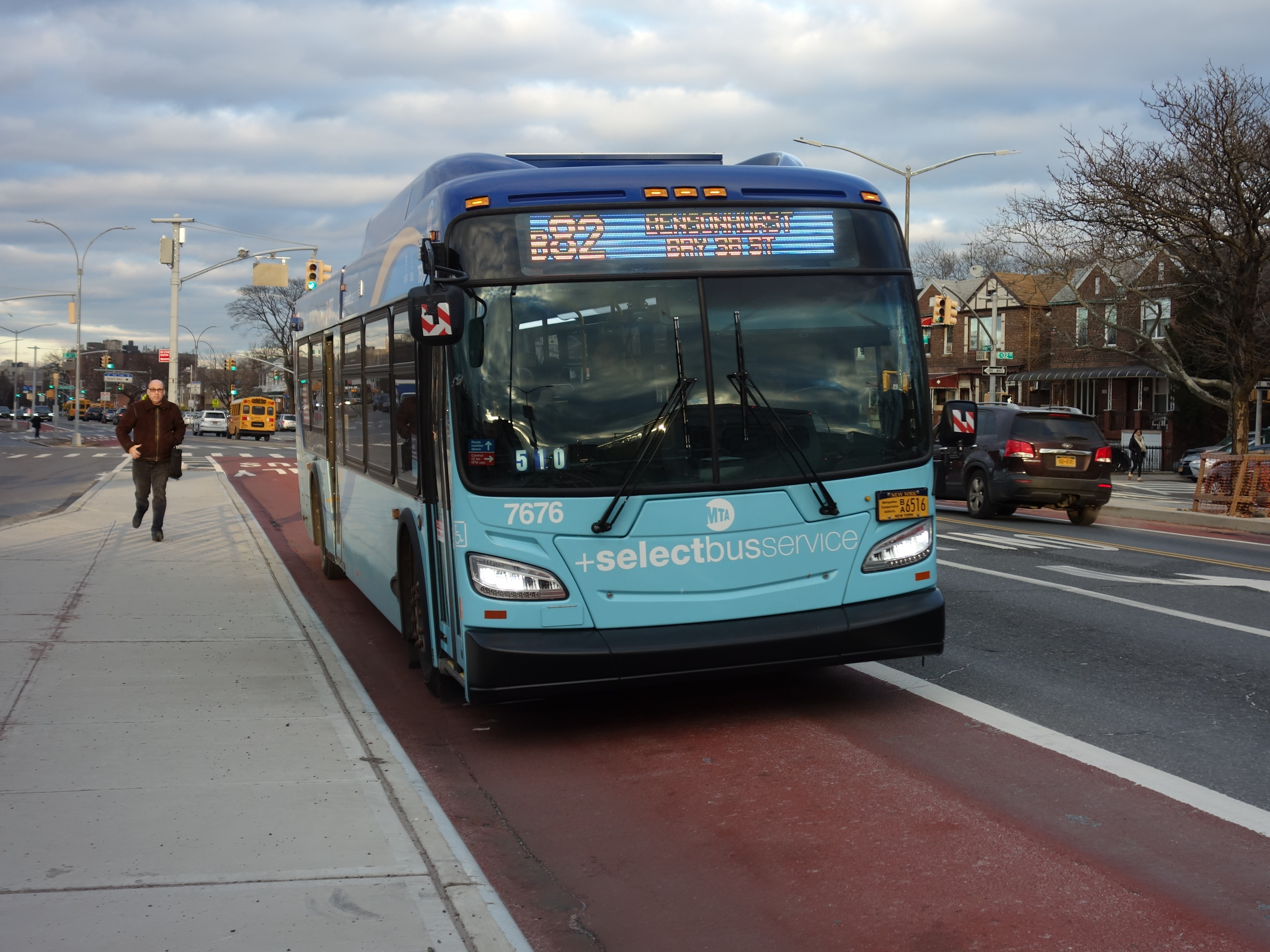
- A 2018 XD40 (7676) on the Bensonhurst-bound B82 SBS at Kings Highway/Nostrand Avenue in January 2019

Overview
- System: MTA Regional Bus Operations
- Operator: New York City Transit Authority
- Garage: East New York Depot
- Vehicle: New Flyer Xcelsior XD40 (both routes); New Flyer Xcelsior XDE40; New Flyer Xcelsior XE40; Orion VII NG HEV (local main; SBS supplemental)
- Began service: September 10, 1995 (bus service); September 13, 2010 (Limited-Stop service); October 1, 2018 (B82 SBS)

Route
- Locale: Brooklyn, New York, U.S.
- Communities served: Starrett City, East New York, Canarsie, Flatlands, Midwood, Gravesend, Bensonhurst, Bath Beach, Coney Island
- Start: Starrett City – Pennsylvania Avenue and Seaview Avenue; Canarsie – Glenwood Road and Rockaway Parkway at Rockaway Parkway ( L train)
- Via: Pennsylvania Avenue, Flatlands Avenue, Kings Highway, Bay Parkway, Cropsey Avenue, Avenue K (SBS only)
- End: Bath Beach – Cropsey Avenue and Bay 37th Street (SBS and some weekend AM local trips); Coney Island – Mermaid Avenue and Stillwell Avenue at Stillwell Avenue( D F <F> N Q trains) (local only)
- Length: 10.5 miles (16.9 km) (local bus route); 9 miles (14 km) (SBS bus route)
- Other routes: B6 Bay Parkway/Avenue J/Flatlands Avenue; B7 Saratoga Avenue/Kings Highway

Service
- Operates: All times (B82 local); Weekdays only (B82 SBS)
- Annual patronage: 5,376,007 (2025)
- Transfers: Yes
- Timetable: B82 B82 SBS

The B82 bus route constitutes a public transit line in central Brooklyn, New York City. It connects Starrett City in southeast Brooklyn with Coney Island on Brooklyn's southwestern coast. The B82 operates primarily via Kings Highway and Flatlands Avenue in southern Brooklyn. The route is operated by MTA Regional Bus Operations, under the New York City Bus and Select Bus Service brands.

The B82 was created in 1995 as a combination of two routes: one (former B5) running from Bath Beach to Midwood, Brooklyn, and another (former B50) running from Midwood to Starrett City, via the New York City Subway's Canarsie–Rockaway Parkway subway station. The B82 used to have a limited service, which ran from 2010 to 2018 when Select Bus Service, a brand of bus rapid transit, replaced the B82 LTD on October 1, 2018.

== Route description and service ==
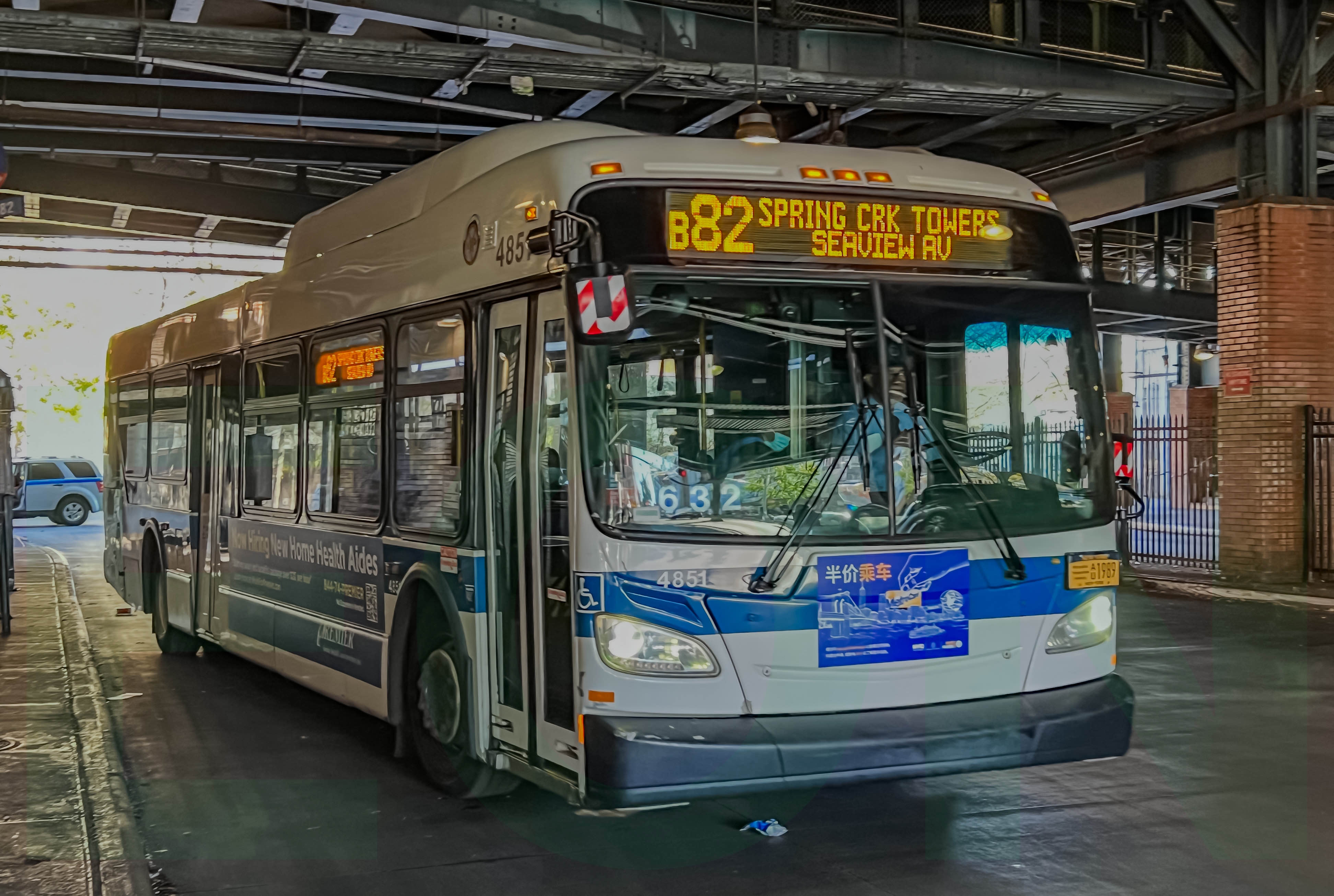
A 2011 XD40 (4851) on the Spring Creek-bound B82 local at the Coney Island station in November 2022

The B82 and B82 SBS comprise a high-volume east-west route in Brooklyn, serving Coney Island, Bensonhurst, Midwood, Flatlands, Canarsie, and Spring Creek. The B82 runs all times, while the B82 SBS runs weekdays only. They serve as a feeder route to several subway stations including Canarsie–Rockaway Parkway at Glenwood Road, Kings Highway at East 16th Street, Kings Highway at McDonald Avenue, Kings Highway at West 7th Street, Bay Parkway at 86th Street, and at Coney Island–Stillwell Avenue. The B82 SBS, however, does not serve the Coney Island subway station, as it terminates at Bay 37th Street. Between Canarsie and Bensonhurst, the B82 runs parallel to or concurrent with the B6 local and limited-stop routes. The B82 also shares Kings Highway with the B7 local route between Flatbush Avenue and Coney Island Avenue. The B82 SBS serves Avenue K from Flatbush Avenue to Utica Avenue, where the B82 local does not.

=== Westbound ===
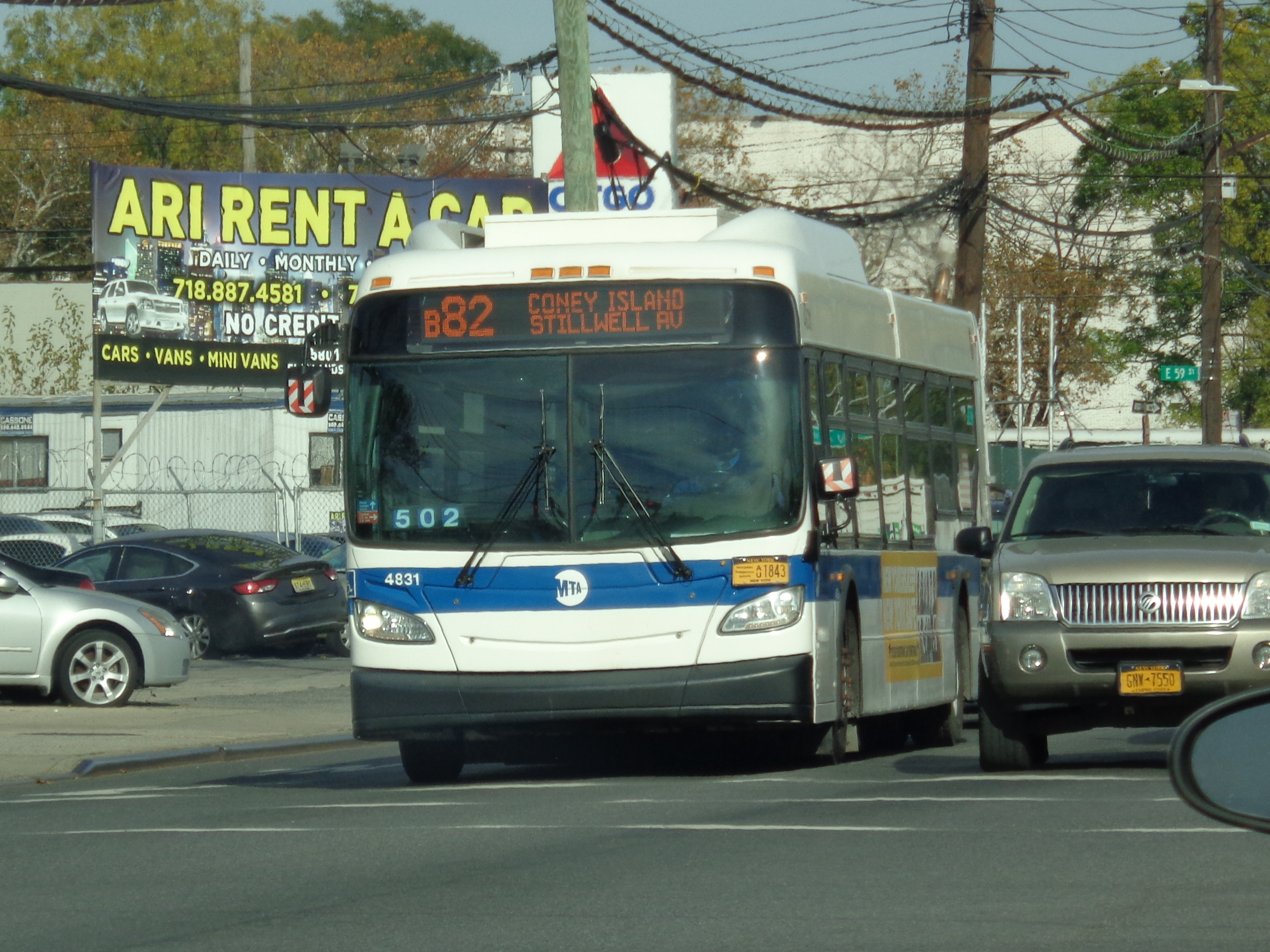
A 2011 XD40 (4831) on a Coney Island-bound B82 local on Flatlands Avenue

The westbound B82 originates in the southern edge of Spring Creek at Pennsylvania and Seaview Avenues, which is technically within the Starrett City development (a.k.a. Spring Creek Towers). From there, it travels north on Pennsylvania Avenue through Starrett City until it reaches Flatlands Avenue, where it turns left (west). The B82 turns right onto East 103rd Street, and two blocks later, makes a left at Glenwood Road to serve the Canarsie–Rockaway Parkway subway station. The route turns left onto Rockaway Parkway, and at Flatlands Avenue, the westbound B82 makes a right, continuing its westbound route.

At Utica Avenue, the B82 SBS diverges right on Avenue K before turning left onto Kings Highway. The B82 local continues along Flatlands, turns right at Flatbush Avenue, and a block later, turns left on Kings Highway. For one block east of Ocean Avenue, Kings Highway is one-way eastbound. As a result, the westbound B82 gets diverted onto Avenue P until East 18th Street, where it turns left and then right back onto Kings Highway. The B82 continues onto Kings Highway until the road ends at Bay Parkway in Bensonhurst, then turns left (southwest) onto Bay Parkway. The B82 turns left (south) onto Cropsey Avenue, then continues south through Bath Beach and Bensonhurst and across Coney Island Creek into Coney Island. The route proceeds south to Mermaid Avenue, where it turns left again to access its western terminus in the Coney Island–Stillwell Avenue station's bus loop. The B82 SBS, meanwhile, terminates at Bay 38th Street, several blocks after turning left onto Cropsey.

=== Eastbound ===
The eastbound B82 local originates in the Coney Island–Stillwell Avenue station's bus loop. Exiting the bus loop, it turns right, northbound onto Stillwell Avenue. Then the B82 turns left on Neptune Avenue and right onto Cropsey Avenue, duplicating the westbound route until Bay Parkway's intersection with Kings Highway. The eastbound B82 SBS originates at Bay 37th Street and Crospey Avenue. Unlike the westbound B82, the eastbound B82 continues along Kings Highway without interruption until Flatbush Avenue, where it turns right and then left onto Flatlands Avenue. The B82 SBS continues further along Kings Highway, bears right along Avenue K, then bears left onto Flatlands at Utica Avenue.

At East 96th Street, the B82 turns left, making a right onto Glenwood Road two blocks later. After serving the Rockaway Parkway station, the B82 returns to Flatlands Avenue at East 103rd Street, turning right and then left. The route then continues to Pennsylvania Avenue, turning right and running to its eastern terminus at Seaview Avenue.

=== Select Bus Service stops ===
Station Street traveled	Direction	Connections
Pennsylvania Avenue Seaview Avenue	Northbound Terminus; Southbound Station	NYC Bus: B82 Local, B83; MTA Bus: BM2, BM5
Schroeders Avenue Pennsylvania Avenue	Bidirectional	NYC Bus: B82 Local, B83; MTA Bus: BM2, BM5
Vandalia Avenue Pennsylvania Avenue	Bidirectional	NYC Bus: B82 Local, B83; MTA Bus: BM2, BM5
Louisiana Avenue Flatlands Avenue	Bidirectional	NYC Bus: B82 Local; MTA Bus: BM2
East 105th Street Flatlands Avenue	Bidirectional	NYC Bus: B60 to Williamsburg Bridge Plaza, B82 Local; MTA Bus: B103 Limited, BM2
Rockaway Parkway Glenwood Road	Bidirectional	NYC Bus: B6, B17 (rush hours only), B42 to Canarsie Pier, B60, B82 Local; NYC Subway: train at Canarsie–Rockaway Parkway
Remsen Av Flatlands Avenue	Bidirectional	NYC Bus: B6, B17, B82 Local
East 82nd Street Flatlands Avenue	Southbound	NYC Bus: B6, B82 Local; MTA Bus: B103 Limited, BM2
East 80th Street Flatlands Avenue	Northbound	NYC Bus: B6, B82 Local; MTA Bus: B103 Limited, BM2
Ralph Avenue Flatlands Avenue	Bidirectional	NYC Bus: B6, B47, B82 Local
Utica Avenue Flatlands Avenue	Bidirectional	NYC Bus: B46 local, B46 SBS, B82 Local; MTA Bus: BM1
Avenue K Kings Highway	Bidirectional	NYC Bus: B7; MTA Bus: BM1
Flatbush Avenue Kings Highway	Bidirectional	NYC Bus: B7, B9, B41, B82 Local; MTA Bus: Q35
Nostrand Avenue Kings Highway	Bidirectional	NYC Bus: B7, B44 local, B44 SBS, B82 Local; MTA Bus: BM4
Ocean Avenue Avenue P	Southbound	NYC Bus: B7, B49, B82 Local; MTA Bus: BM3
Ocean Avenue Kings Highway	Northbound	NYC Bus: B7, B49, B82 Local; MTA Bus: BM3
East 16th Street Kings Highway	Bidirectional	NYC Bus: B2, B7, B31, B82 Local; MTA Bus: B100; NYC Subway: trains at Kings Highway
Coney Island Avenue Kings Highway	Bidirectional	NYC Bus: B7, B68, B82 Local
McDonald Avenue Kings Highway	Bidirectional	NYC Bus: B82 Local; NYC Subway: trains at Kings Highway
West 7th Street Kings Highway	Northbound	NYC Bus: B82 Local; NYC Subway: trains at Kings Highway
West 8th Street Kings Highway	Southbound	NYC Bus: B82 Local; NYC Subway: trains at Kings Highway
78th Street Bay Parkway	Northbound	NYC Bus: B4 at Stillwell Avenue, B6, B82 Local
79th Street Bay Parkway	Southbound	NYC Bus: B4 at Stillwell Avenue, B6, B82 Local
86th Street Bay Parkway	Bidirectional	NYC Bus: B1, B6, B82 Local; NYC Subway: trains at Bay Parkway
Bath Avenue Bay Parkway	Bidirectional	NYC Bus: B6, B64, B82 Local
Bay 37th Street Crospey Avenue	Northbound	NYC Bus: B3 to Bergen Beach, B6 to East New York, B64, B82 Local to Coney Island, X28/X38
Bay 38th Street Crospey Avenue	Southbound Terminus	NYC Bus: B3 to Bergen Beach, B6 to East New York, B64, B82 Local to Coney Island, X28/X38

== History ==
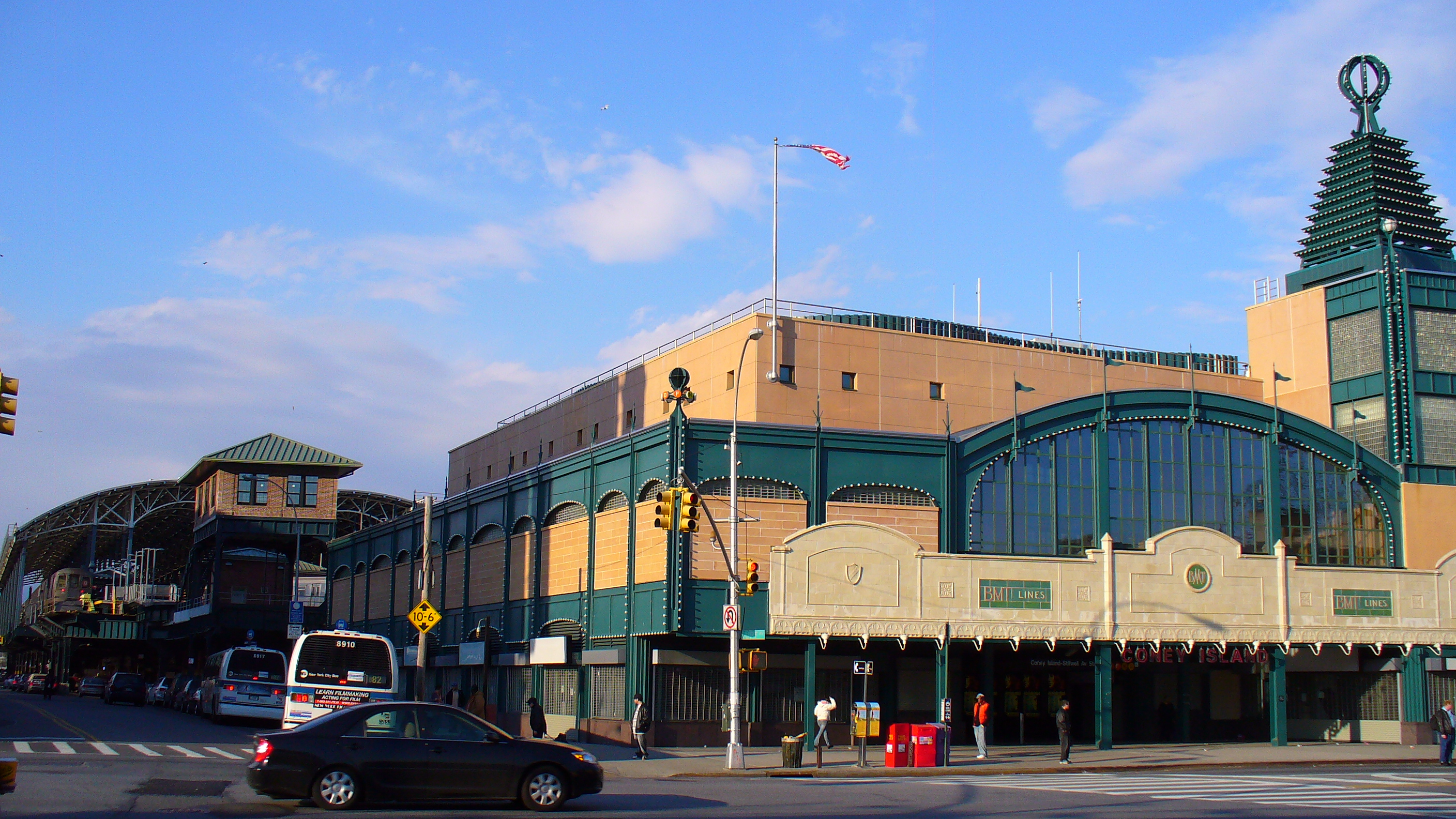
Two 1996 Nova Bus RTSs: 8910 on the B82 local, and 8917 on the B37, at the Stillwell Avenue station

The portion of the B82 west of Flatbush Avenue began on August 29, 1924 under Queens Bus Lines, labeled as the B5. The eastern portion, the B50, was introduced in 1975 from Starrett City to Canarsie–Rockaway Parkway, and it was extended to Coney Island Avenue in Midwood on November 12, 1978 as part of a massive restructuring of the bus network in Southern Brooklyn.

On November 7, 1982, the routes of the B6 and B50 in Canarsie and Spring Creek were swapped between Rockaway Parkway and Pennsylvania Avenue. The B6, which had previously run along Flatlands Avenue along this whole segment would run along Flatlands Avenue, East 103rd Street, and Glenwood Road, while the B50, which had run along Glenwood Road, would run along Flatlands Avenue. In addition, a pair of special B50 buses would be rerouted on weekdays to serve the Abe Stark Senior Center at East 103rd Street and Farragut Road. The morning trip would leave Seaview Avenue at 9:02 a.m. while the afternoon trip would arrive at Abe Stark at 2 p.m.

On June 28, 1992, the B50 was rerouted to run via Avenue K instead of via Flatbush Avenue as it shifted from Kings Highway to Flatlands Avenue for twelve months to examine whether the new routing would save time and reduce collisions. The modified route avoided left turns at Flatbush Avenue heading westbound and with Flatlands Avenue heading eastbound; the change saved two minutes of travel time in each direction. Since residents on Avenue K and the local City Council member protested the move, the B50 temporarily returned to Flatbush Avenue on May 9, 1993. It was decided to maintain the routing via Flatbush Avenue due to their wishes, even though the alternate routing would have saved $30,000 annually.

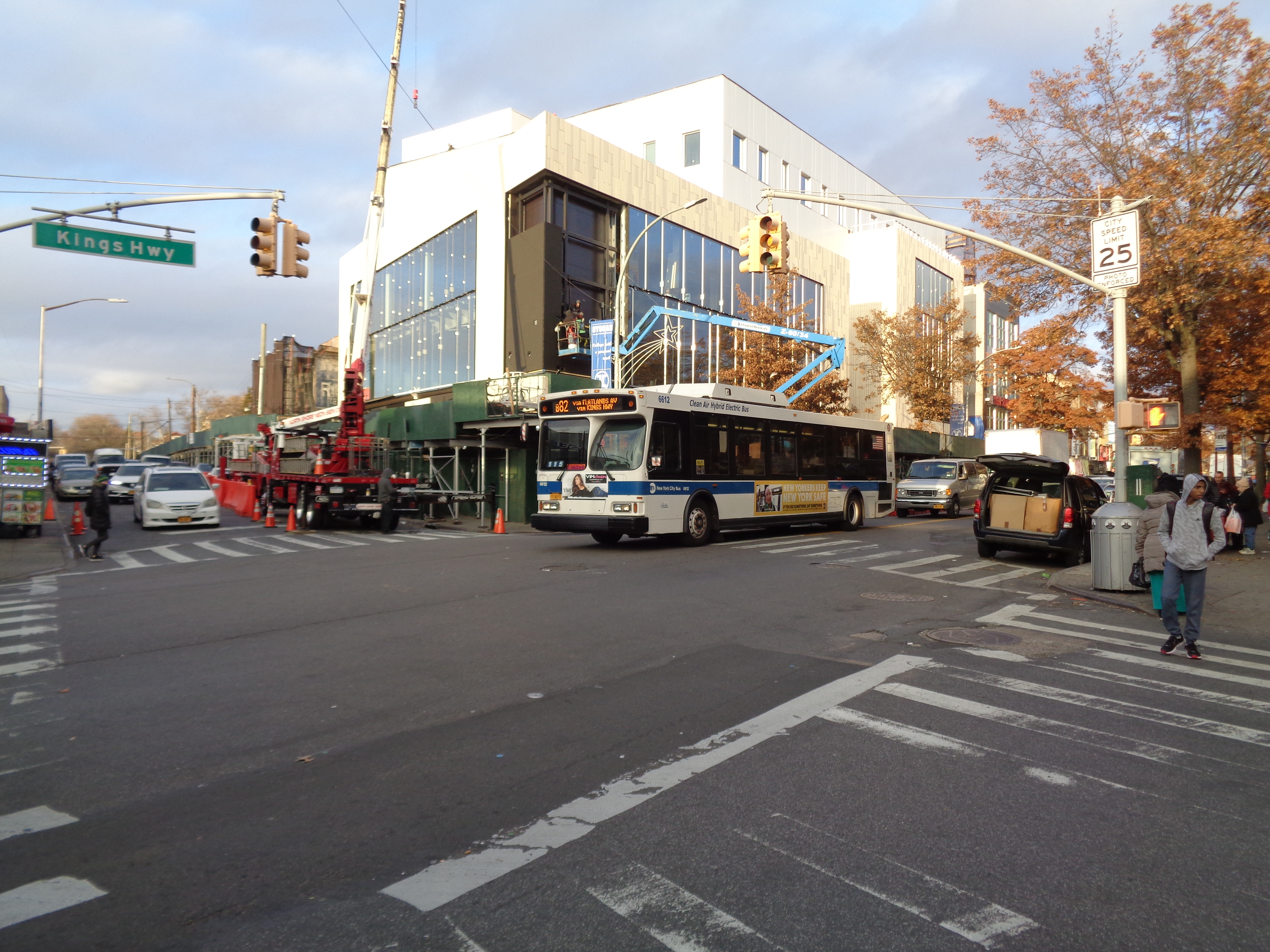
A 2005 Orion VII OG HEV (6612) on the Coney Island-bound B82 local at Kings Highway/East 16th Street in November 2017

The B5 and B50 were combined to form the B82 on September 10, 1995.

In late April 2001, after the reopening of a ramp to the Belt Parkway that had been closed for 35 years, left turns from southbound Cropsey Avenue to eastbound Bay 52nd Street were prohibited. The New York City Transit Authority, which runs the B82 route, had not been informed of the traffic pattern change. As such, southbound B82 buses were required to make a circuitous detour, turning right from Cropsey onto 26th Avenue, then left onto a service road of Shore Parkway. With the new traffic pattern, the southbound B82 was able to continue on its route, but it skipped four stops that were formerly located on Cropsey Avenue, which prompted complaints from elderly riders. Several hundred people protested the change, and on May 26, 2001, the four bus stops were restored with the installation of a left turn lane at Canal Avenue, a block south of Bay 52nd Street. At the time, the B82 terminated at Canal Avenue.

The B82 was extended to Coney Island on September 7, 2003. Some buses started short turning at Cropsey Avenue and 25th Avenue, rather than running the full route.

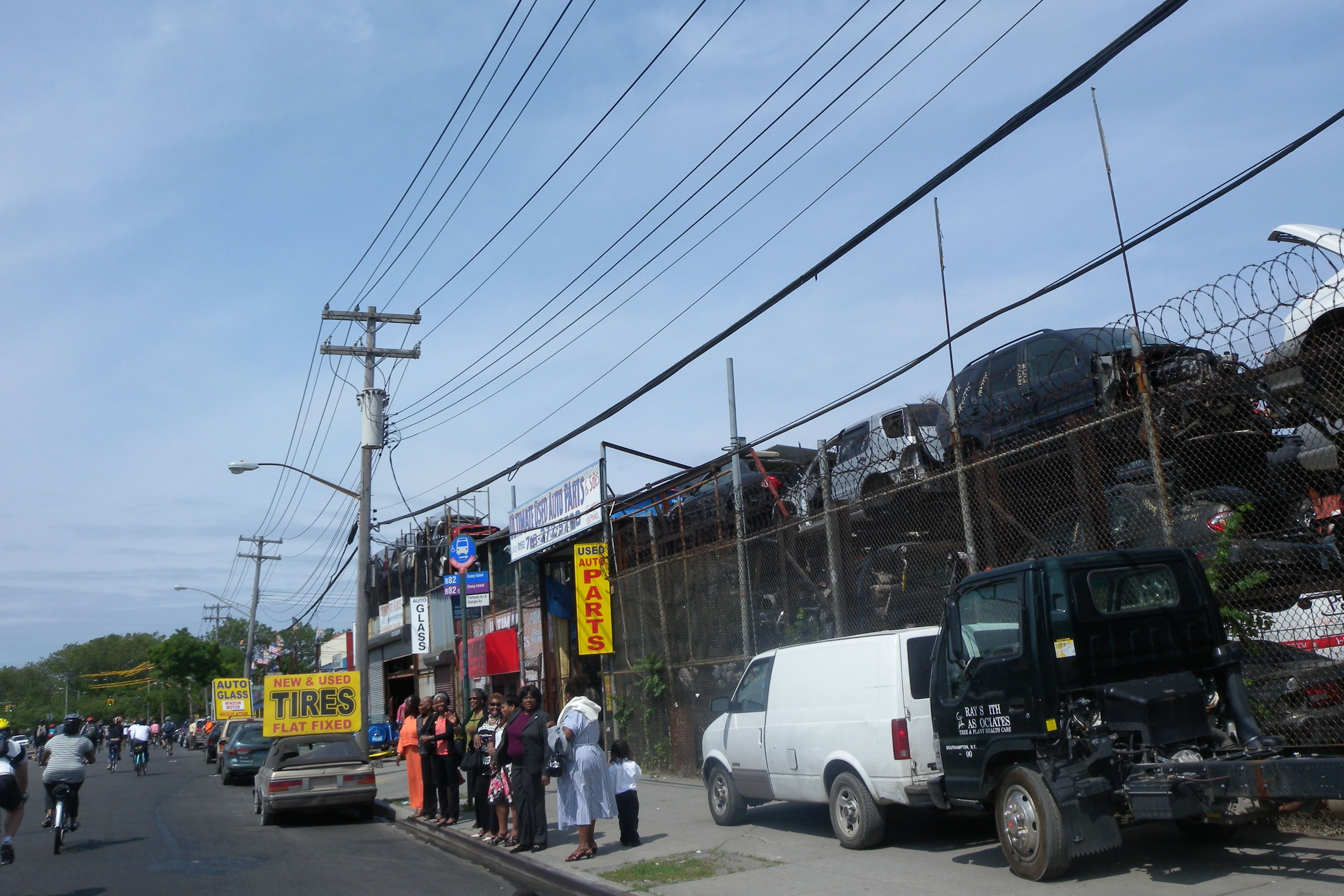
A B82/B82 LTD Coney Island bus stop at the Flatlands/Georgia Avenues scrapyard

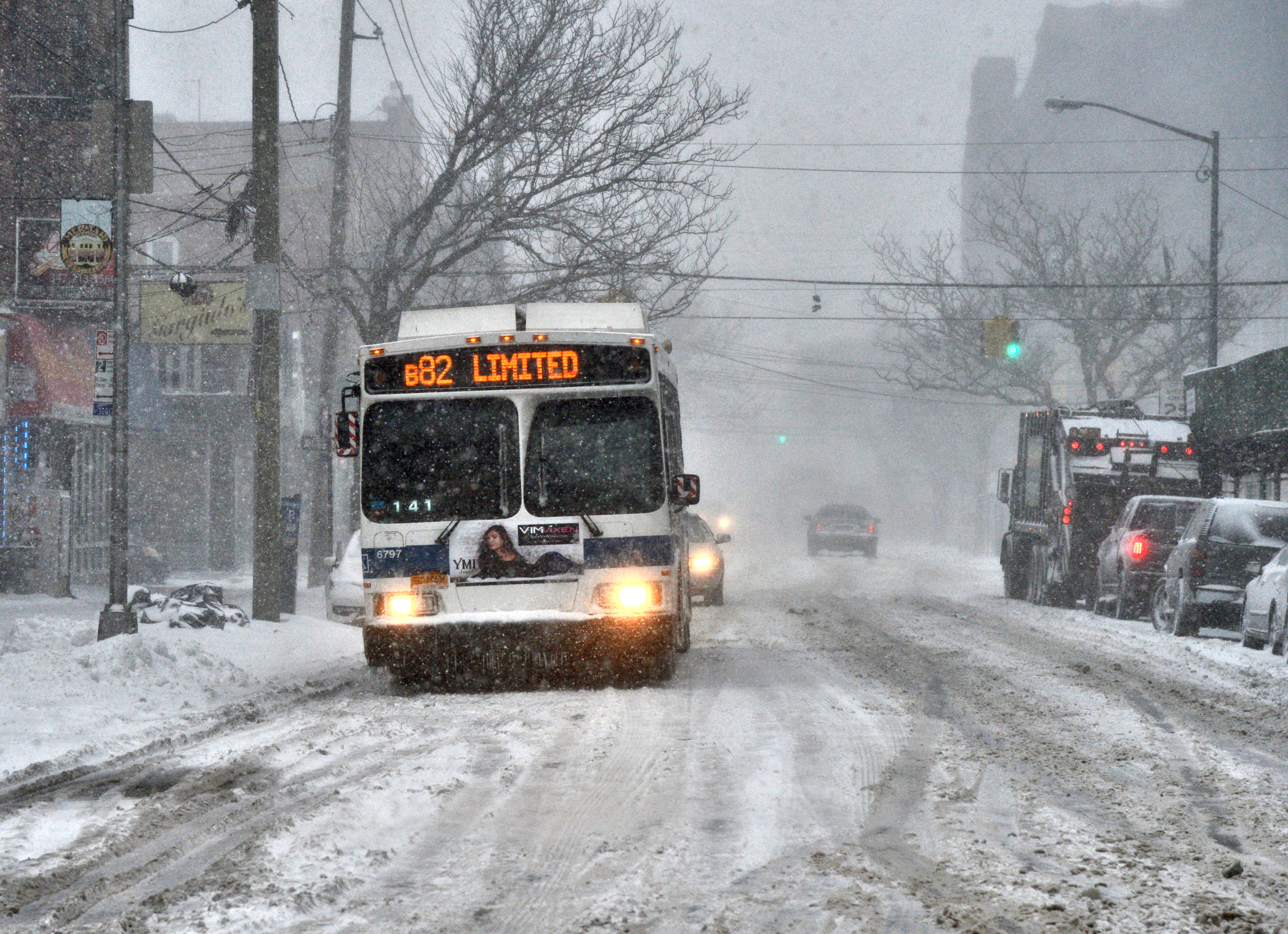
A 2007 Orion VII OG HEV (6797) on the B82 Limited approaching Coney Island in January 2018, prior to SBS implementation

Limited-stop service was added on September 13, 2010 during rush hours, making fewer stops between Bay 38th Street and Rockaway Parkway station. B82 limited buses made all local stops east of Rockaway Parkway and west of Bay 38th Street. The implementation of limited service was approved by the MTA Board on May 25, 2010. Limited-stop service was expected to cut travel times by up to ten minutes. Of the 55 bus stops along the B82 route, 18 would serve both limited-stop and local buses. Limited-stop service was implemented on the B82 because ridership had increased significantly on the route since the introduction of MetroCard in the late 1990s; because of heavy traffic congestion; and because of the concentration of riders at specific stops along the route.

To reduce missed connections and waiting time between the B36/B82 buses and the Q route at Coney Island, New York City Transit began operating yellow holding lights to signal bus operators to wait for imminently arriving trains. The lights, which began operating March 10, 2014, are on the northeast corner of Surf and Stillwell Avenues and in the Mermaid Avenue Bus Loop. This system operates during late nights, from 11:00 P.M. to 5:00 A.M. daily.

=== Conversion to Select Bus Service ===
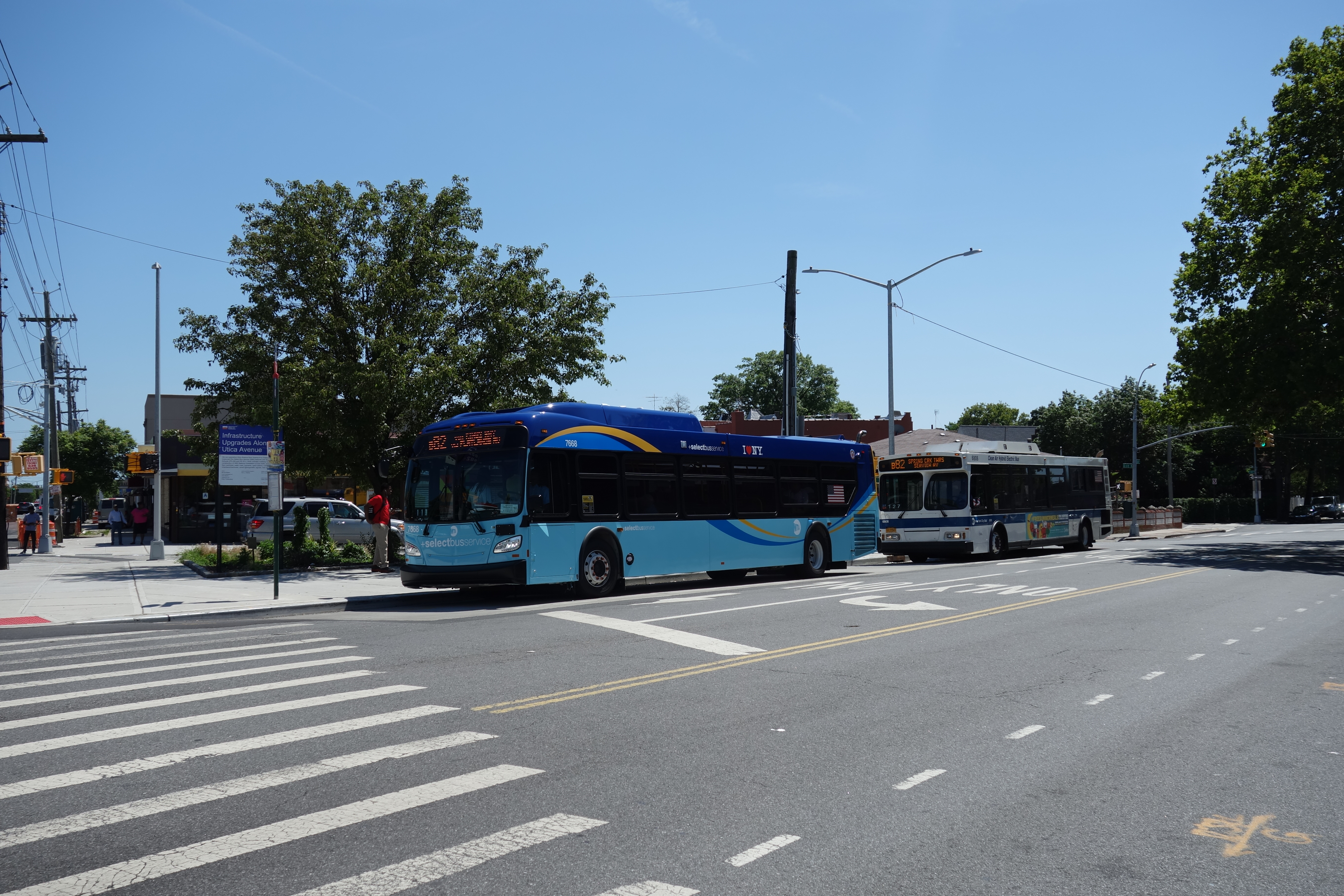

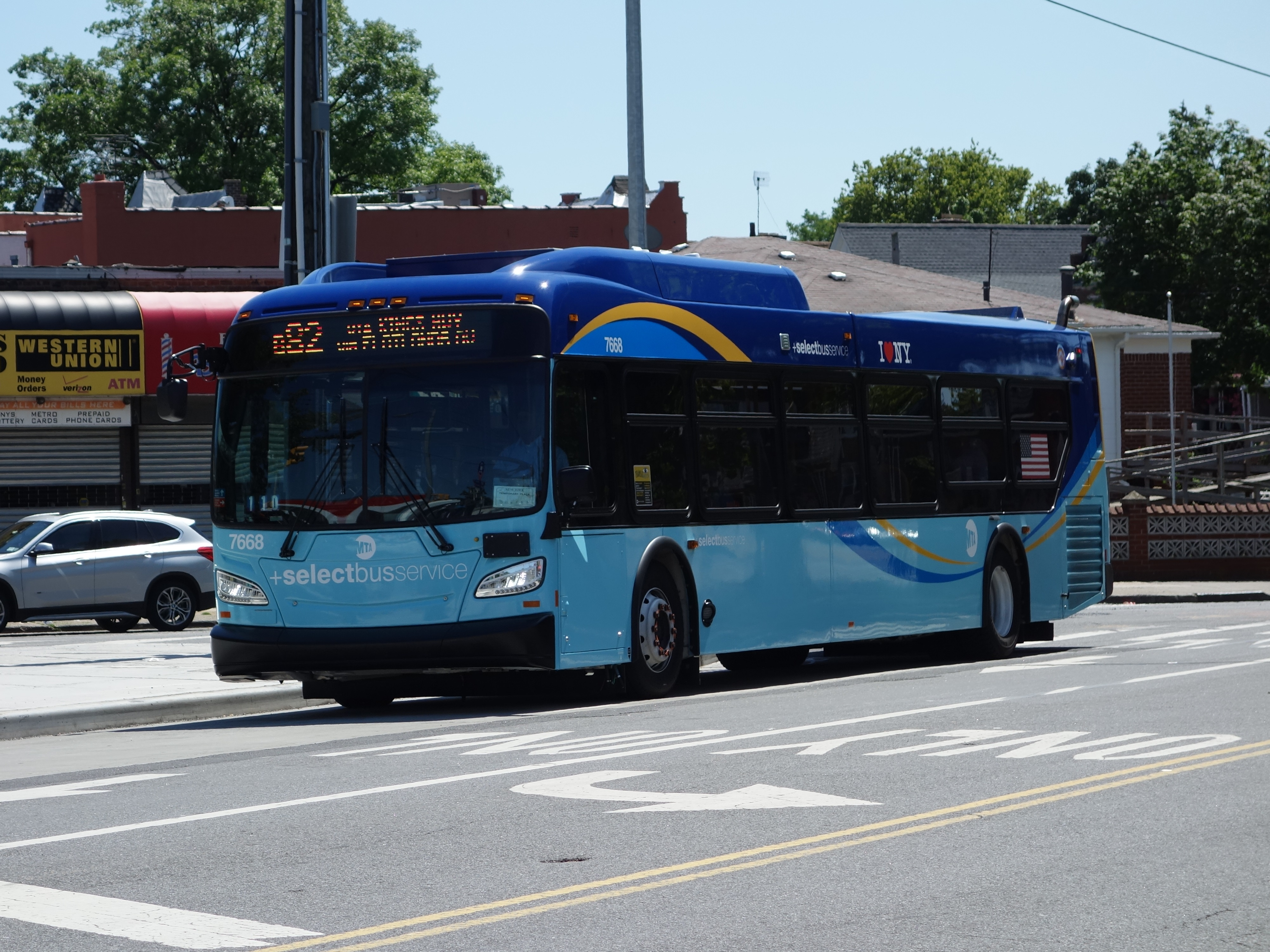
A 2007 Orion VII OG HEV (6808; top only), and a 2018 XD40 (7668) on the Spring Creek-bound B82, at Flatlands/Utica Avenues. The XD40 is wrapped for Select Bus Service.

The B82 Limited was recommended for conversion to a Select Bus Service bus rapid transit route by multiple studies. As part of the conversion process, bus lanes were installed in conjunction with Vision Zero improvements, such as additional crosswalks and pedestrian islands. Three route modifications were made in conjunction with the implementation of B82 service. All B82 SBS service began to terminate at Cropsey Avenue and Bay 38th Street; only B82 local service would continue to Coney Island, because of low ridership between Cropsey Avenue/Bay 38th Street and Coney Island. To avoid congestion, the B82 SBS was rerouted via Avenue K instead of using Flatbush Avenue to connect Flatlands Avenue and Kings Highway. Additionally, the B82's circuitous westbound routing to the Rockaway Parkway subway station was streamlined. The B82 used to continue west on Flatlands Avenue where it made a right onto East 96th Street and then onto eastbound Glenwood Road. At East 98th Street, the B82 turned left into the Rockaway Parkway terminal, where it made an additional 180-degree turn onto southbound Rockaway Parkway. The B82 turned right at Flatlands Avenue and resumes its westbound route. This detour sometimes took as long as 10 minutes to get back to Flatlands Avenue. To reduce travel time, westbound buses were rerouted via Glenwood Road, when the road was converted from one-way to two-way.

The section of Kings Highway between East 23rd Street and Avenue K started to have two bus lanes located in the travel lanes. Larger, lighted bus shelters, real-time passenger information screens, ADA-accessible bus stops with tactile edge strips, wider medians, and reconstructed, level landing platforms were also implemented. To speed up bus service even more, traffic signal prioritization, which keeps traffic lights green whenever buses approach the intersections, was also implemented. The B82 SBS also runs at longer periods during the day then the B82 Limited did.

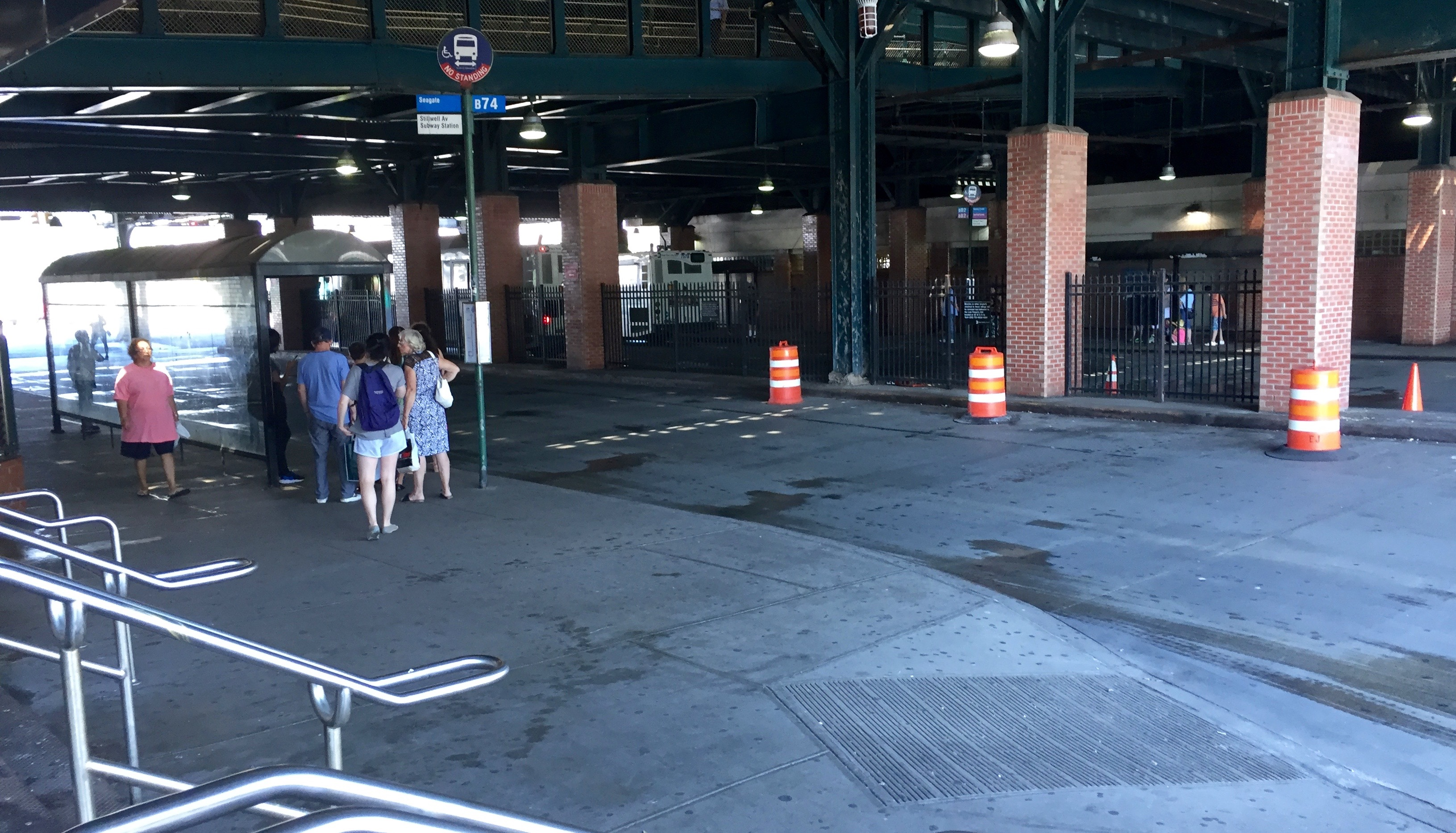
The bus terminal underneath the Coney Island–Stillwell Avenue station, where the B82 local terminates.

By May 2018, the implementation of Select Bus Service on the B82 was postponed indefinitely because of complaints from politicians who represent districts along the B82's route. There was also some opposition from residents of Bensonhurst. In Flatlands, residents raised complaints about the parking spaces lost because of the B82 SBS's new routing. The B82 SBS was previously scheduled to replace the current Limited-Stop route in July 2018. As of July 2018, implementation of the B82 SBS was deferred to October 2018. The MTA and DOT went back to the community and came up with two alternatives. Under the first alternative, the bus lanes would be reduced to 17 blocks from 28 blocks, 12 additional loading zones would be added, making 39, 17 left-turn bans would be implemented, and an additional turn bay would be added. Under the second alternative, bus lanes would be reduced to 9 blocks, there would be 40 loading zones, and 3 new turn bays. While the bus lanes would be shorter under this alternative the hours of the bus lane would be increased from 7 to 10 a.m. and 4 to 7 p.m. Monday to Friday, to 7 a.m. to 7 p.m. on all days. The original plan would have affected 169 parking spots while the first alternative would have affected 126 and the second 81. The second alternative was chosen, and Select Bus Service was implemented on October 1, 2018.

=== Bus redesign ===
On December 1, 2022, the MTA released a draft redesign of the Brooklyn bus network. As part of the redesign, B82 local service south of Bay 37th Street would be discontinued; the westbound B82 local would run on Shore Parkway instead of Cropsey Avenue between Bay Parkway and 26th Avenue. The B82 would be rerouted to follow the B82 SBS path on Kings Highway and Avenue K. Service on Flatlands Avenue between Avenue K and Flatbush Avenue would be discontinued, and closely spaced stops would be eliminated. On the B82 SBS, the stop at Avenue K would be removed in both directions, while the eastbound stop at East 80th Street would be relocated to East 82nd Street.

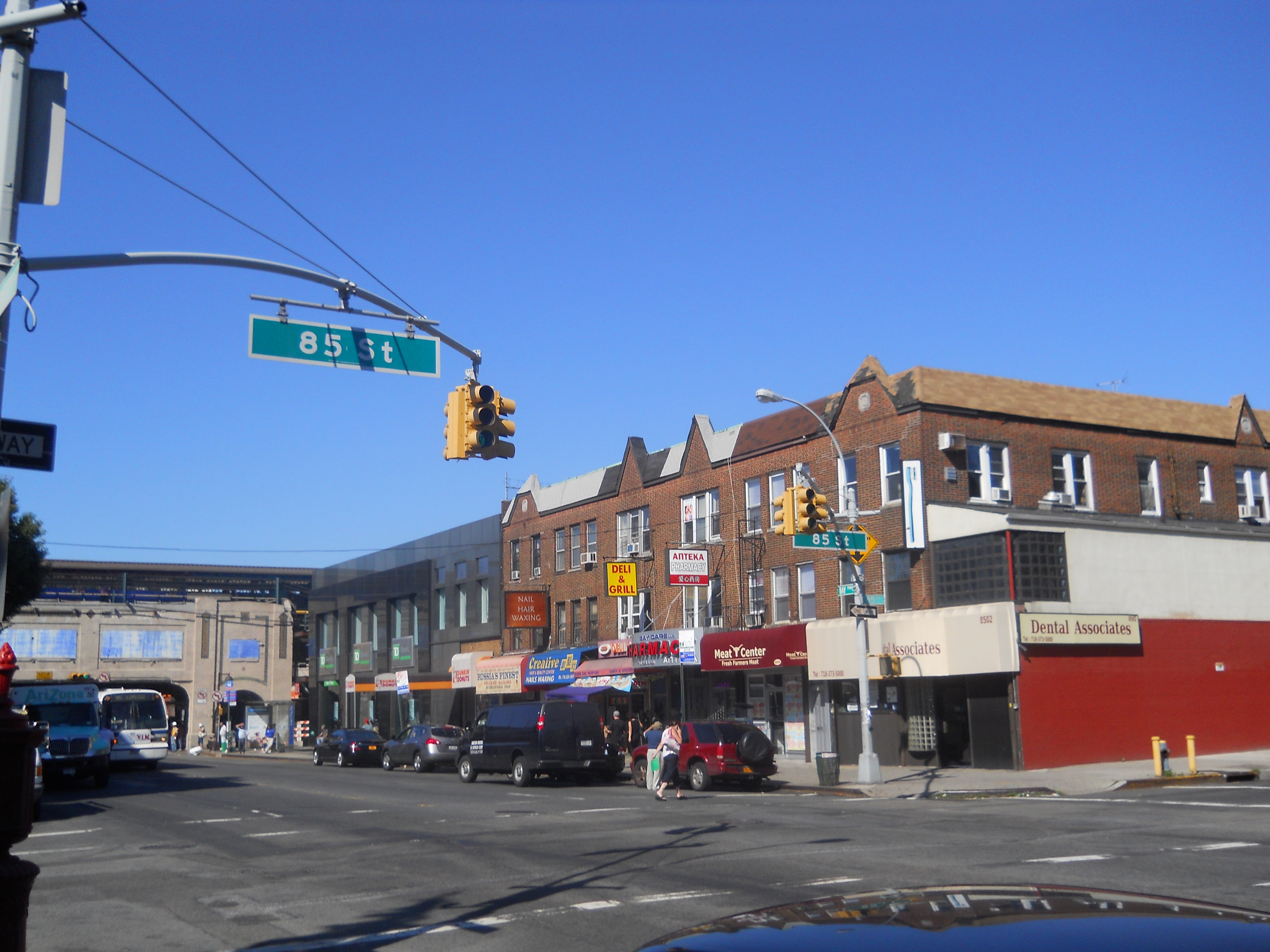
An RTS bus on the New Lots Avenue-bound B6 Limited, across from a B6 Bensonhurst/B82 Coney Island bus stop, viewed from Bay Parkway/85th Street.

== See also ==
- B6 (New York City bus), concurrent with the B82 in Flatlands and Bensonhurst
- B7 (New York City bus), concurrent with the B82 on Kings Highway in Midwood
