= Tompkins Avenue station =

Tompkins Avenue station may refer to:

- Tompkins Avenue (BMT Lexington Avenue Line), a station on the demolished BMT Lexington Avenue Line
- Tompkins Avenue (BMT Myrtle Avenue Line), a station on the demolished BMT Myrtle Avenue Line
