= Kings Highway (Brooklyn) =

Boulevard in Brooklyn, New York

- Interactive map of Kings Highway
- Namesake: Kings County
- Maintained by: New York City Department of Transportation
- Location: Brooklyn, New York City
- Postal code: 11203, 11210, 11223, 11229, 11234, 11236
- Coordinates: 40°36′45″N 73°57′05″W
- West end: Bay Parkway & 78th Street
- Major junctions: McDonald Avenue; Coney Island Avenue; Ocean Avenue; Flatbush Avenue; Nostrand Avenue; Linden Boulevard
- East end: East 98th Street

Construction
- Commissioned: 1704

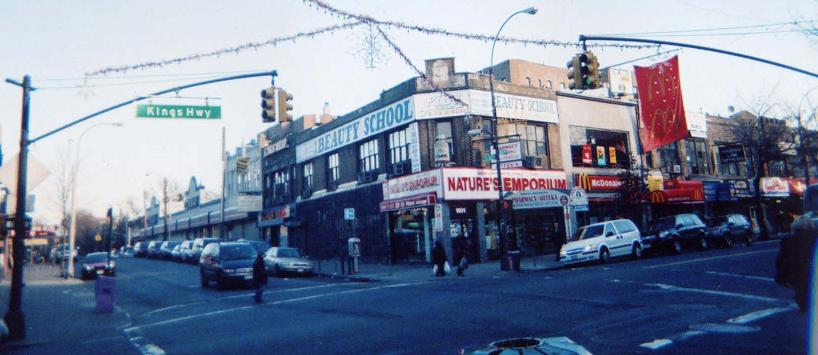
A view of Kings Highway from East 16th Street in 2006

Kings Highway is a broad avenue that curves about the southern part of the Borough of Brooklyn in New York City. Its west end is at Bay Parkway and 78th Street. East of Ocean Avenue, the street is largely residential. It tracks eastward, then northeast, then north through Brooklyn and reaches East 98th Street in central Brooklyn. At that point, it flows into Howard Avenue to provide seamless access to Eastern Parkway, another major road in Brooklyn with side medians and service roads.

A Business Improvement District has been established along part of the road to support stores, restaurants and businesses in that area.

== History ==
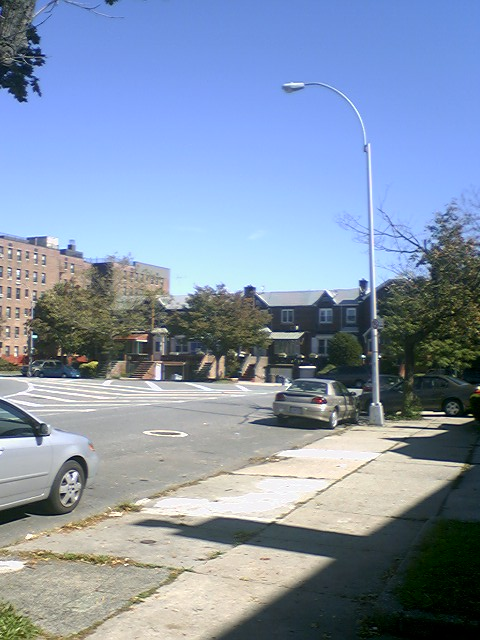
Kings Highway entering the Flatlands section of Brooklyn

Originally an Indian trail, the strip was known as "Mechawanienck" or "the ancient pathway", a name recorded in a 1652 deed. It was later known as the "wagon path" in a 1682 deed.

Although not entirely built in 1704, "King's Highway" was formed in colonial New York when the locals connected the many smaller established roads, cow paths, and Indian trails that passed through Kings County. They named the highway after the county, which was named in honor of King Charles II of England on November 1, 1683.

=== Original route ===
Originally, Kings Highway was much longer than it is now. It began at Brooklyn Ferry, now called Fulton Ferry, where Ferry Road, now called Old Fulton Street and Furman Street, ran southeastward to the small Dutch town of New Amersfoort, now known as Flatlands. It took a sharp westward turn at that point and passed into another of Brooklyn's original six towns, New Utrecht. It led into Yellow Hook (Bay Ridge), ending at Denyse's Ferry, operated by a colonial-era landowner, about where Shore Road and 86th Street meet today. In southwest Brooklyn, the thoroughfare had other names, including: "State Road," "Road from Fort Hamilton to New Utrecht," and "Road from New Utrecht to Denyse's Ferry."

==== Route description ====
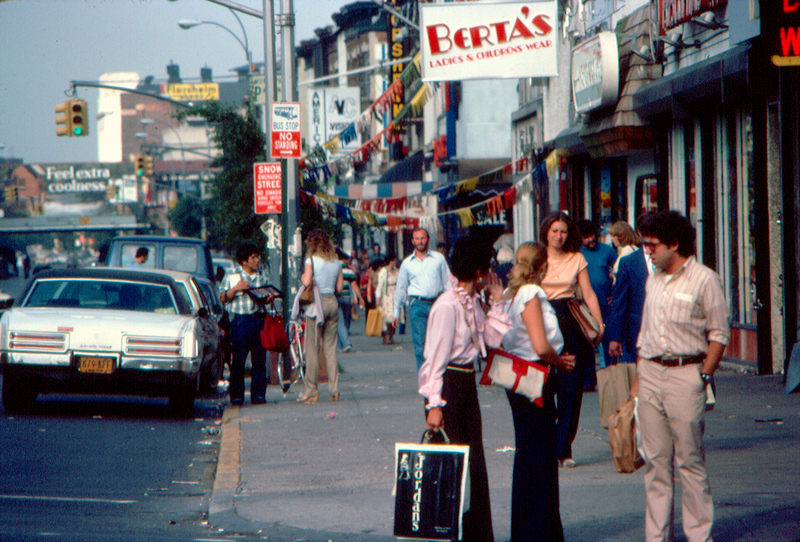
Kings Highway at Coney Island Avenue (1977)

According to the Dyker Heights Historical Society, the Highway ended at the ferry landing in what is now Fort Hamilton, Brooklyn. In 1740 Denyse, a local New Utrecht resident, took over ferry operations in The Narrows, serving Brooklyn and Staten Island. Denyse’s Ferry was located at the base of the hill on which Fort Hamilton was built, near today’s Fort Hamilton Parkway and Shore Road. Kings Highway traveled northeast from Denyse’s Ferry to present-day 86th Street. This portion of the Highway is known today as Fort Hamilton Parkway.

At the corner of Kings Highway and 86th Street stood New Utrecht Town Hall, built in 1878 (demolished in 1912). This building was also used as a school, police station, and jail. Kings Highway traveled northeast, at about a 40-degree angle to the street grid, until it reached the middle of 81st Street between Eleventh and Twelfth Avenues. At the intersection of the current-day 81st Street and Eleventh Avenue, Denyse’s Lane branched off in a northwardly direction. St. Phillips Church in Dyker Heights now occupies part of the former lane, which meandered down to Van Brunt’s Dock in Bay Ridge. Closer to Bay Ridge, Denyse’s Lane was known as Van Brunt’s Lane, today's 79th Street.

The highest natural point in southwestern Brooklyn is at Eleventh Avenue and 82nd Street, at Dyker Heights. During the time of Kings Highway, the hill was known as New Utrecht Mount. According to the Brooklyn Eagle, it gave “the soldiers of revolutionary time an outlook from which they could note the movements of their opponents, not only as they approached from the sea, but maneuvered on Staten Island.” At 81st Street and Twelfth Avenue was Flax Pond. This site was filled in and developed; it is now occupied by Junior High School (JHS) 201.

After the pond, Kings Highway traveled southeast until it reached Waters Avenue, which ran between Thirteenth and Fourteenth avenues from 83rd Street until it reached the Dyker Meadows. At Fourteenth Avenue, Kings Highway meandered around the northern limits of the Dyker Meadows Swamp, which occupied much of the block between Fourteenth and Fifteenth avenues between 83rd and 84th streets. From Sixteenth Avenue to Eighteenth Avenue, Kings Highway ran on a slight diagonal; this section appears in today’s street grid as 84th Street.

At Sixteenth Avenue is the cemetery where the original New Utrecht Reformed Church of 1700 stood. At Eighteenth Avenue is the church of 1828. At this 1828 church, the Highway made an abrupt 90 degree leftward turn and traveled northward one and a half blocks (as part of today’s Eighteenth Avenue) until it made another abrupt 90 degree turn, this time eastward. It was built around the Van Pelt Manor House of 1686. In 1741 a Milestone was placed in front of the home to indicate the distances to New York City (8 1/4 miles), to Denyse’s Ferry (2 1/2 miles), and to Jamaica, Queens (15 miles). Kings Highway continued east into the Town of Gravesend, Brooklyn. According to the Brooklyn Eagle, in the 19th century, Kings Highway “was one of the best and most convenient thoroughfares for the lovers of riding and driving.”

The British General Lord Cornwallis traveled along the road with his troops on August 26, 1776, to the Battle of Brooklyn. He achieved a major defeat for the Continental Army in the American Revolutionary War. When President George Washington came to survey the agricultural abilities of Kings, Queens, and Suffolk counties after the war in 1792, he traveled down this rural road. Gradually, farmers moved into the area and developed their homesteads along the road.

=== Naming ===
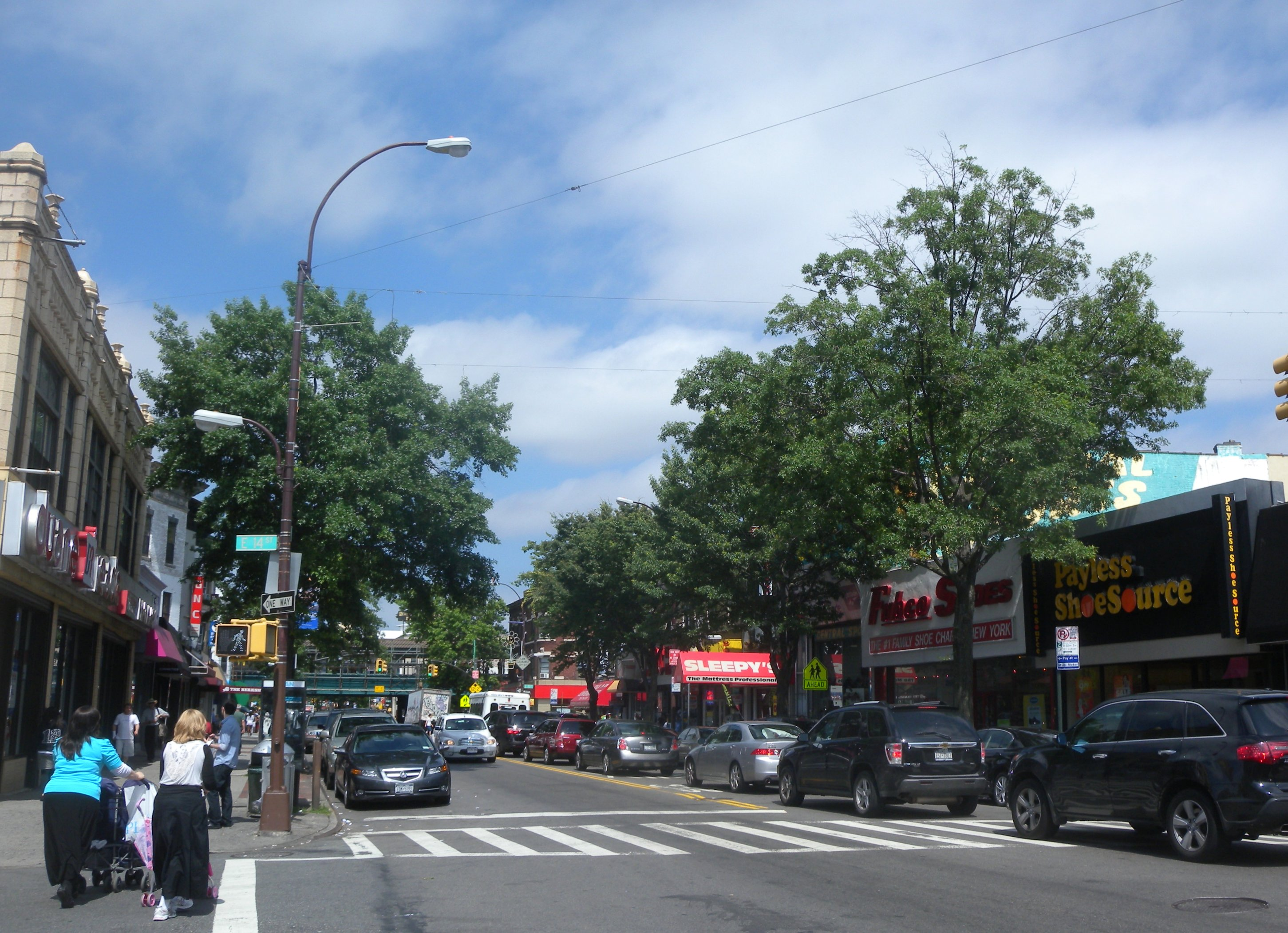
Commercial section of Kings Highway

Though the road was the major highway running through the towns of Brooklyn, Flatbush, Flatlands, Gravesend and New Utrecht, it did not have a commonly used name until the 19th century, when the portion from Brooklyn Ferry to Flatbush came to be called Flatbush Road, now Flatbush Avenue. It was often referred to simply as “lane” or “road,” followed by a short description. Thus it would be described as “the lane between Gravesend and New Utrecht.” It also took on local names in each town, such as “Gravesend Lane” and “Ferry Road.” The name “Kings Highway” was a common reference to public highways during colonial times and has been used for other roads around the New York City area that are in no way connected with the present Kings Highway.

=== 1922 alteration ===
Despite its long history and importance as a connection through the borough of Brooklyn, in the early 1920s local city planners proposed to have the street demapped as part of an effort to regularize the street grid. Instead, it was widened in 1922, east of Ocean Avenue where park malls were created. The route was altered to straighten as many sections as possible, and to make it easy for vehicle traffic.

Following the example of the parkways designed by Frederick Law Olmsted (1822–1903), who designed the Eastern and Ocean parkways, the boulevard malls were planted with trees to separate local and through traffic along the street. Unlike Olmsted’s parkways, however, the Kings Highway malls are much narrower because existing development constrained their size; they do not provide the leisurely promenades that characterize Olmsted’s work.

== Transportation ==
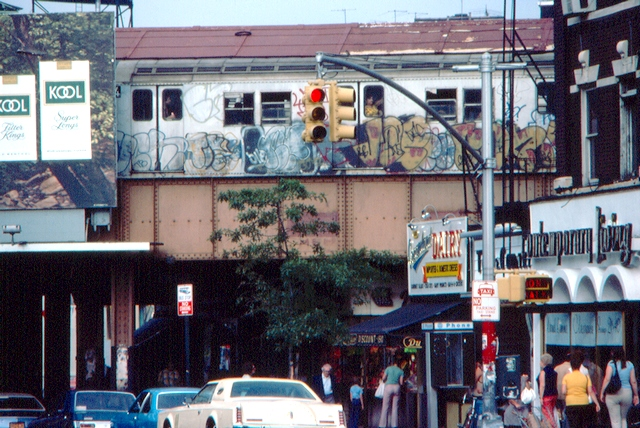
Kings Highway station (BMT Brighton Line), early 1980s

Kings Highway is served by the following bus routes:

- The B7 runs between Lenox Road (Bedford-Stuyvesant), or East 95th Street (Midwood) and Flatbush Avenue, with select daytime buses extended to Coney Island Avenue.
- The B8 runs between Beverly Road and Avenue D.
- The B82 SBS serves the corridor west of Avenue K, and is joined with the B82 local at Flatbush Avenue.
- The Midwood-bound B100 runs non-stop from Ocean Avenue to East 16th Street, before terminating.

The street is also served by the following New York City Subway stations:

- BMT Sea Beach Line (N and W trains), at West 8th Street
- IND Culver Line (F and <F> trains), at McDonald Avenue
- BMT Brighton Line (B and Q trains), at East 16th Street
- IRT New Lots Line (2, 3, 4, and 5 trains), at Livonia Avenue

== See also ==
- Avalon Theater
