= Reid Avenue station =

Reid Avenue station may refer to:

- Reid Avenue (BMT Fulton Street Line), a station on the demolished BMT Fulton Street Line
- Reid Avenue (BMT Lexington Avenue Line), a station on the demolished BMT Lexington Avenue Line
