= Varsity Bus Company =

Defunct public bus transport company and current school bus operator in New York City

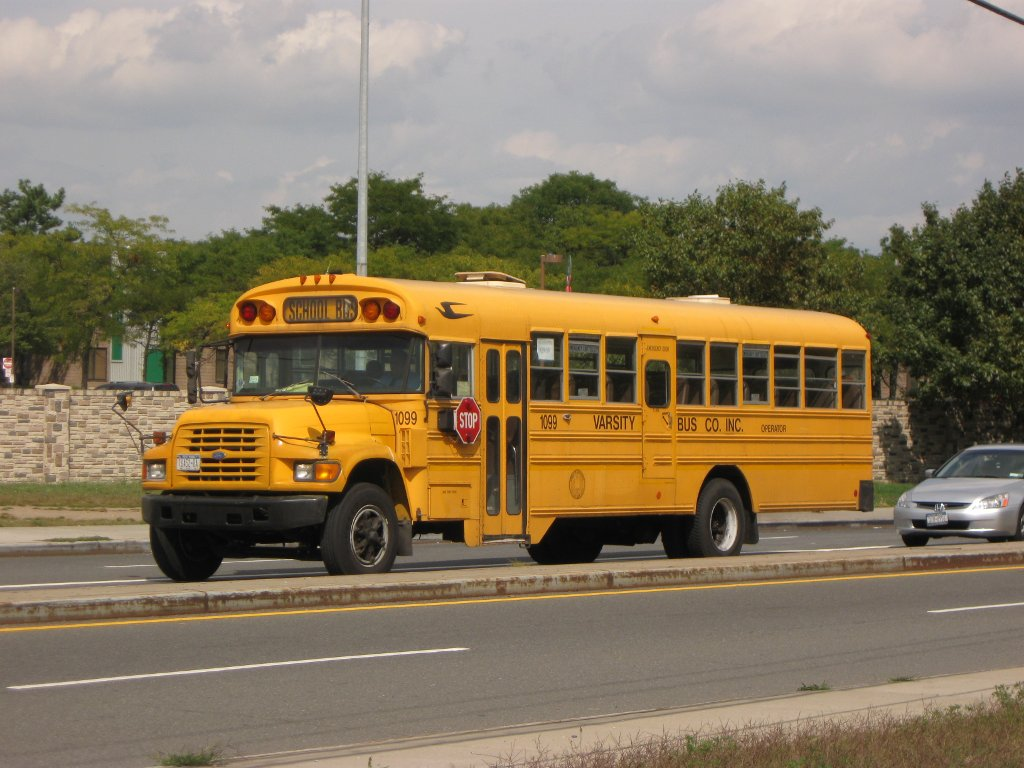
- Varsity Bus Company #1099 deadheads through Brooklyn.
- Headquarters: 626 Wortman Avenue; Brooklyn, NY 11208
- Locale: New York City
- Service type: School bus service
- Chief executive: Andrew Brettschneider

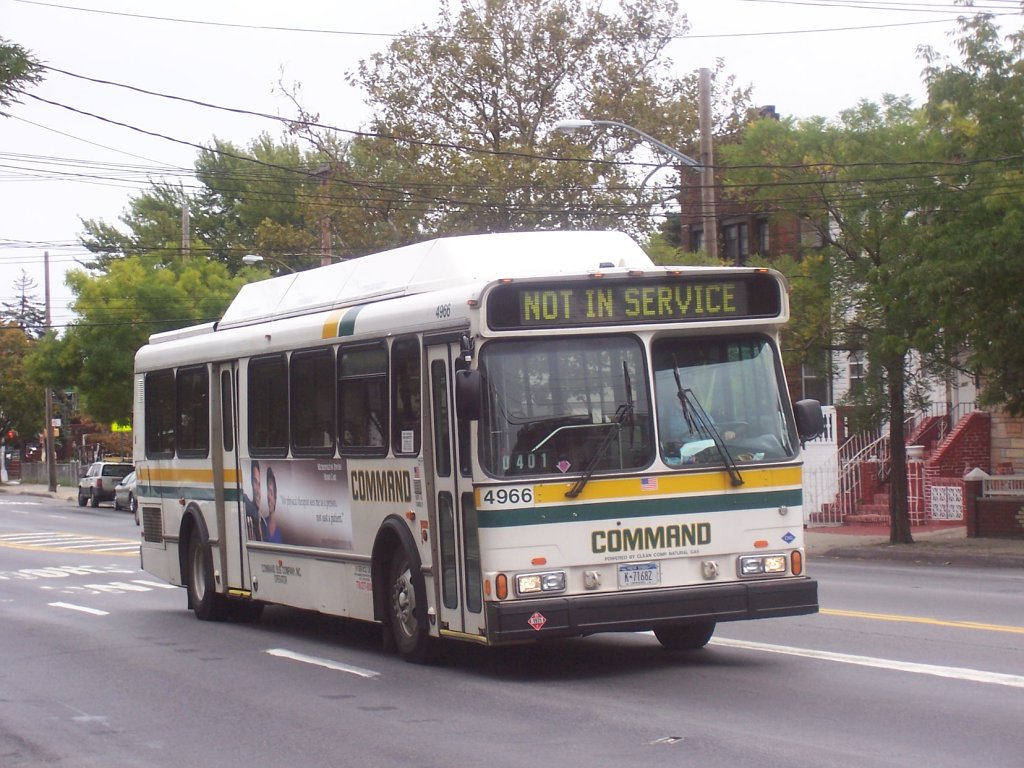
A Command Bus bus before takeover by MTA Bus. This bus became MTA Bus 744.

Varsity Bus Company is a former school bus operator in New York City. This company was established in 2003 when it acquired some of the school bus routes that had been operated by Varsity Transit, a sister company that had operated from 1965 to 2003. Varsity ceased operations by the 2010s, and the headquarters of Varsity were later used by Total Transportation and L&M Bus Corp.

From 1979 until 2005, Varsity Transit affiliate Command Bus Company operated two local and seven express transit bus routes, routes that are now operated by MTA Bus Company. Varsity Transit and Command Bus Company were 40-percent owned by Green Bus Lines, 40-percent owned by Triboro Coach, and 20-percent owned by Jamaica Central Railways. Varsity Bus Company is owned by former executives of Green Bus Lines.

== Command Bus ==
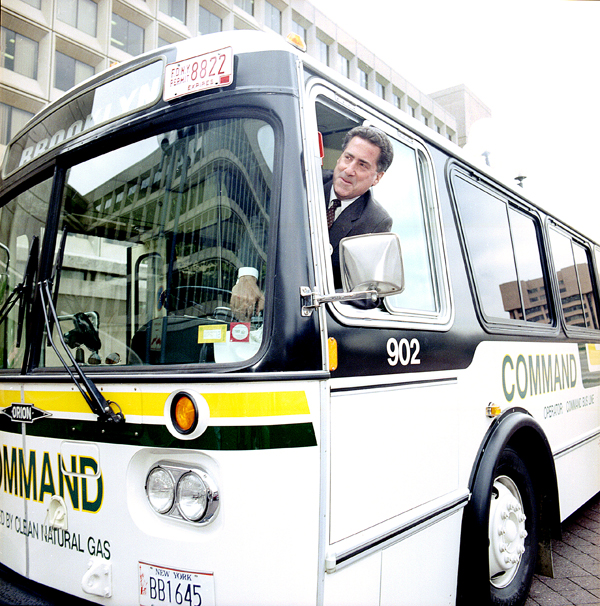
U.S. Energy Secretary John S. Herrington driving a Command Orion I CNG-powered bus in 1988.

Command Bus traces its history to Pioneer Bus Corporation, established in 1954 by three small school bus and charter bus operators. Until 1960, when it obtained a franchise for the current B100, it only operated school, charter, and racetrack buses. Several express buses were implemented in 1972. Command Bus Company was incorporated October 22, 1979 by the late Mr. William Cooper (1895-1985) to resume bus service following a long strike at Pioneer, which went out of the express and local bus business when the strike started.

Like its corporate owners Green Bus Lines, Triboro Coach, and Jamaica Central Railways, the late Mr. Jerome Cooper (1928-2015) was the chairman of the board of both Varsity Transit and Command Bus Company. Originally co-housed with Varsity Transit, the operations of Command were eventually moved into a new NYCDOT facility at Spring Creek Depot, 12755 Flatlands Avenue in Brooklyn (this garage was leased by MTA Bus following the transfer of Command Bus Company routes to MTA Bus in 2005), it was previously built and owned by the New York City Department of Transportation before being sold to MTA Bus in early 2009).

In 1988, two Command buses were fitted by the Brooklyn Union Gas Company with engines which operated on compressed natural gas (CNG). By the mid-1990s, many of the buses operated by Command ran on CNG.

== Bus routes ==
Command operated the following routes, which after the MTA takeover continued to be operated out of the Spring Creek Bus Depot:

Route (Name)	Terminal A	Major streets of travel	Terminal B	Notes
Brooklyn Local
B100 (Mill Basin Local)	Midwood East 16th Street and Quentin Road at Kings Highway ( B Q trains)	Quentin Road, Fillmore Avenue, East 66th Street	Mill Basin; 56th Drive and Strickland Avenue	No overnight service.
B103 (Canarsie Limited)	Canarsie; Williams Avenue and Flatlands Avenue	All trips: East 105th Street, Avenue M, East 80th Street, Avenue H; Downtown Brooklyn trips: Cortelyou Road, 3rd/4th Avenues, Livingston Street, Cadman Plaza West/Adams Street	Downtown Brooklyn Tillary Street and Adams Street at Cadman Plaza: or -; Midwood Flatbush Avenue and Nostrand Avenue at Flatbush Avenue ( 2 5 trains)	Full route and no overnight service.
Brooklyn-Manhattan express
BM-1 (Mill Basin Express)	Manhattan	Northbound: Trinity Place, Church Street, Park Place, Broadway, Park Row, Frankfort Street, FDR Drive, 23rd Street, Madison Avenue; Southbound: 5th Avenue, 23rd Street, FDR Drive, Water Street, State Street, Battery Place; Downtown Loop only: Park Place, Broadway, Park Row, Frankfort Street, Pearl Street, Water Street, State Street, Battery Place; Brooklyn: Brooklyn-Battery Tunnel, Gowanus Expressway, Prospect Expressway, Coney Island Avenue, Cortelyou Road, Ocean Avenue, Avenue K, East 66th Street	Mill Basin; 56th Drive and Strickland Avenue: or -; Bergen Beach; Avenue U and 71st Street?	
BM-2 (Canarsie Express)	Midtown Manhattan	Brooklyn-Battery Tunnel, Gowanus Expressway, Prospect Expressway, Coney Island Avenue, Cortelyou Road, Flatbush Avenue, Avenue H, East 80th Street, Avenue M, Pennsylvania Avenue (downtown trips only)	Canarsie; Flatlands Avenue and Williams Avenue	
BM-2S (Starrett City Express; via Flatlands Avenue)	Lower Manhattan		Starrett City; Pennsylvania and Seaview Avenues.	Runs as BM2 under the MTA.
BM-3 (Kingsbay Express)	Manhattan	Brooklyn-Battery Tunnel, Gowanus Expressway, Prospect Expressway, Coney Island Avenue, Cortelyou Road, Ocean Avenue, Batchelder Street, Shore Parkway, Emmons Avenue	Sheepshead Bay; Emmons Avenue and Shore Boulevard	
BM-4 (Gerritsen Beach Express)	Midtown Manhattan; East 57th Street and 2nd Avenue		Gerritsen Beach; Gerritsen Avenue and Lois Avenue	Operated by Erin Tours until 1988.; Originally went on Nostrand Avenue between Avenue K and Flatbush Avenue, Flatbush Avenue between Nostrand Avenue and Cortelyou Road, instead of Avenue K and Ocean Avenue.; Midtown service via Downtown area operates all day.; Midtown express service bypassing Downtown area operates weekday peak rush hours.; Downtown service operates weekday peak rush hours.
BQM-1 (Starrett City Express)	Midtown Manhattan; East 57th Street and 2nd Avenue	Manhattan:- 34th Street, 5th Avenue (southbound), Madison Avenue (northbound) Brooklyn: Linden Boulevard, Ashford Street, Cozine Avenue, Van Siclen Avenue, Vandalia Avenue, Pennsylvania Avenue Queens: Queens–Midtown Tunnel, Long Island Expressway, Woodhaven Boulevard, Cross Bay Boulevard	Starrett City; Pennsylvania Avenue and Seaview Avenue	Formerly made only one stop in Queens, at 79th Street in Lindenwood.; Expanded Queens service along Woodhaven and Cross Bay Boulevards began April 2010.; Last pickup to Manhattan and first dropoff from Manhattan is in Rego Park/Middle Village.; No Downtown service; Downtown service provided by weekday rush hour BM2 service.; Renumbered as BM5 on July 16, 2007.
Special Services; All discontinued in 2001
BMJ-1 (Meadowlands Special for Sheepshead Bay)	Meadowlands Raceway	Avenue Z, Coney Island Avenue, Avenue M, 23rd Avenue, 65th Street, 19th Avenue, 86th Street, 4th Avenue, Flatbush Avenue	Sheepshead Bay; East 15th Street and Sheephead Bay Road at Sheepshead Bay ( B Q trains)	
BMJ-2 (Meadowlands Special for Starrett City)	Meadowlands Raceway	Flatlands Avenue, Avenue M, Kings Highway, Nostrand Avenue, Flatbush Avenue	Starrett City; Pennsylvania Avenue and Flatlands Avenue	
BQ-5 (Race Track Special for Bay Ridge)	Aqueduct Raceway: or -; Belmont Park	All Routes: 86th Street, 19th Avenue, 65th Street, 23rd Avenue, Avenue M, Flatlands Avenue, Pennsylvania Avenue, Linden Boulevard; Aqueduct Route: Centerville Street, Rockaway Boulevard; Belmont Park Route: Springfield Boulevard, Hempstead Turnpike	Bay Ridge; 86th Street and 4th Avenue at 86th St ( R train)	
BQ-10 (Race Track Special for Midwood)	Aqueduct Raceway: or -; Belmont Park	All Routes: Flatbush Avenue, Church Avenue, Linden Boulevard, Conduit Boulevard.; Aqueduct Route: Centerville Street, Rockaway Boulevard; Belmont Park Route: Springfield Boulevard, Hempstead Turnpike	Midwood; Nostrand Avenue and Flatbush Avenue at Flatbush Avenue ( 2 5 trains)	
BQ-11 (Race Track Special for Coney Island)	Aqueduct Raceway: or -; Belmont Park	Kings Highway route: Kings Highway, Avenue M; Coney Island route: Stillwell Avenue, Neptune Avenue, Ocean Parkway, Avenue Z, Nostrand Avenue, Avenue U, Mill Avenue, Ralph Avenue; Both routes: Flatlands Avenue, Pennsylvania Avenue, Linden Boulevard	Coney Island; Mermaid Avenue and Stillwell Avenue at Stillwell Avenue ( D F <F> N Q trains): or -; Midwood; Kings Highway and East 16th Street at Kings Highway ( B Q trains)	
BQ-12 (Shea Special)	Shea Stadium	Flatbush Avenue, Church Avenue, Linden Boulevard, Woodhaven Boulevard, Long Island Expressway, Main Street, Roosevelt Avenue, 111th Street.	Flatbush; Nostrand Avenue and Flatbush Avenue at Flatbush Avenue ( 2 5 trains)	
BW-4 (Yonkers Raceway Special)	Yonkers Raceway	86th Street, 19th Avenue, 65th Street, 23rd Avenue, Avenue M, Flatlands Avenue, Pennsylvania Avenue, Linden Boulevard, Van Wyck Expressway, Whitestone Expressway, Cross Bronx Expressway, Major Deegan Expressway, New York State Thruway	Bay Ridge; 86th Street and 4th Avenue at 86th St ( R train)	
