= Reid Avenue station (BMT Lexington Avenue Line) =

Reid Ave.

General information
- Location: Lexington Avenue and Reid Avenue; Bedford-Stuyvesant, Brooklyn, New York
- Coordinates: 40.690055°N 73.930470°W
- Operator: City of New York (from 1940)
- Line: BMT Lexington Avenue Line
- Platforms: 2 side platforms
- Tracks: 2 (lower level)

Construction
- Structure type: Elevated

History
- Opened: May 13, 1885; 141 years ago
- Closed: October 13, 1950; 75 years ago

Former services
Preceding station	BMT Lines	Following station
Sumner Avenue toward Park Row	12: Lexington Avenue	Gates Avenue toward Eastern Parkway
Location

The Reid Avenue station was a station on the demolished BMT Lexington Avenue Line in Brooklyn, New York City. It was opened on May 13, 1885, and had 2 tracks and 2 side platforms. It was located at the intersection of Lexington Avenue and Reid Avenue, and as such it had a connection to the Utica and Reid Avenues Line streetcars. It closed on October 13, 1950. The next southbound stop was Sumner Avenue. The next northbound stop was Gates Avenue.
