= Sumner Avenue station (BMT Lexington Avenue Line) =

Sumner Ave.

General information
- Location: Lexington Avenue and Sumner Avenue; Bedford-Stuyvesant, Brooklyn, New York
- Coordinates: 40.6890°N 73.9392°W
- Operator: City of New York (from 1940)
- Line: BMT Lexington Avenue Line
- Platforms: 2 side platforms
- Tracks: 2

Construction
- Structure type: Elevated

History
- Opened: May 13, 1885; 141 years ago
- Closed: October 13, 1950; 75 years ago

Former services
Preceding station	BMT Lines	Following station
Tompkins Avenue toward Park Row	12: Lexington Avenue	Reid Avenue toward Eastern Parkway
Location

The Sumner Avenue station was a station on the demolished BMT Lexington Avenue Line in Brooklyn, New York City. It had 2 tracks and 2 side platforms. It was opened on May 13, 1885, and was located at the intersection of Lexington Avenue and Sumner Avenue. It also had connections to the Sumner Avenue Line streetcars. The station closed on October 13, 1950. The next southbound stop was Tompkins Avenue. The next northbound stop was Reid Avenue.
