= B46 (New York City bus) =

Bus route in Brooklyn, New York

b46 b46
- Utica Avenue Line
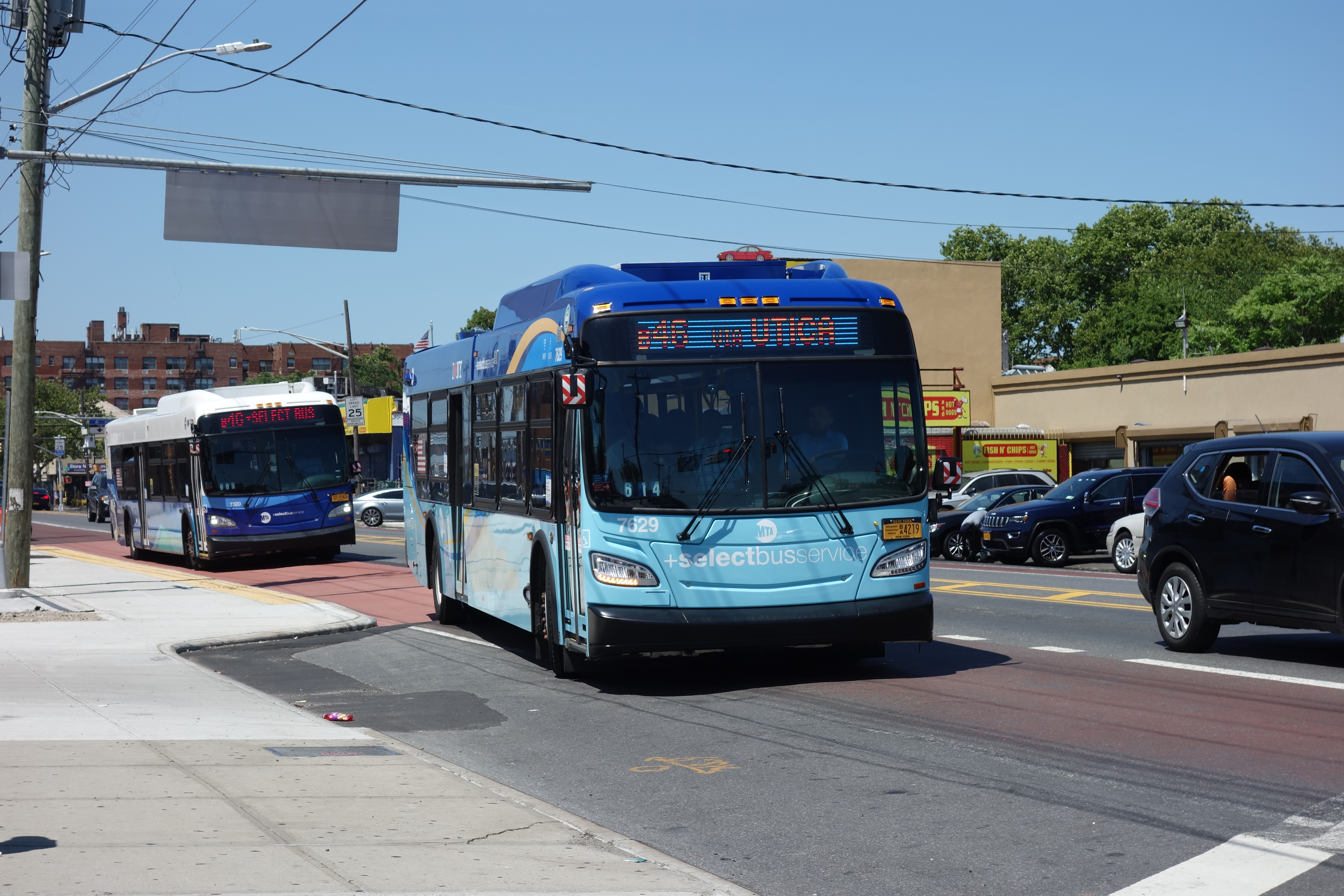
- Two Kings Plaza-bound B46 SBS buses; one 2015 XD40 (7309) and one 2018 XD40 (7629), at Utica/Flatlands Avenues in 2018.

Overview
- System: MTA Regional Bus Operations
- Operator: New York City Transit Authority
- Garage: Flatbush Depot
- Vehicle: B46 (and supplemental service for B46 SBS): Orion VII NG HEV; Orion VII EPA10; New Flyer Xcelsior XD40; B46 SBS only: New Flyer Xcelsior XD60; Nova Bus LFS articulated
- Livery: B46 SBS: Select Bus Service
- Began service: 1800s (trolley line); March 18, 1951 (bus service); 1994 (Limited-Stop service); July 3, 2016 (B46 SBS)

Route
- Locale: Brooklyn, New York, U.S.
- Start: Williamsburg Bridge Plaza Bus Terminal (full route; local service only); Bedford–Stuyvesant – DeKalb Avenue / Kosciuszko Street station (SBS terminus; short runs); Crown Heights – Eastern Parkway / Utica Avenue station (rush hour short runs)
- Via: Broadway, Malcolm X Boulevard, Utica Avenue
- End: Flatlands – Avenue H and Utica Avenue (short runs); Mill Basin / Marine Park – Kings Plaza / Flatbush Avenue & Avenue U (full route)
- Length: 7.17 miles (11.54 km) (trolley); 7.9 miles (12.7 km) (local bus route); 6 miles (9.7 km) (SBS bus route)

Service
- Operates: 24 hours (B46 local) (Note: B46 SBS does not operate overnight)
- Annual patronage: 5,455,981 (2025)
- Transfers: Yes
- Timetable: B46 B46 SBS

The B46 bus route constitutes a public transit corridor in Brooklyn, New York City. The route runs primarily along Utica Avenue north from the Kings Plaza shopping center through Eastern Brooklyn, with continued service west along Broadway to the Williamsburg Bridge Plaza Bus Terminal. The corridor was originally served by a streetcar line, known as the Utica and Reid Avenues Line, Utica−Reid Line, Reid−Utica Line, Reid Avenue Line, or Utica Avenue Line until 1951, when the line was replaced by bus service. The bus route is operated by MTA Regional Bus Operations under the New York City Transit brand.

The B46 consistently ranks among the top five busiest routes in New York City, and is the second busiest in Brooklyn after the B6, serving 13 million riders in 2017. Because of this, in 2009 the route was selected for conversion into bus rapid transit under Phase II of the city's Select Bus Service (SBS) program, implemented on July 3, 2016. The B46 was also notorious for high incidence of crime and fare evasion; in 2014, the magazine The New Yorker declared the route "the most dangerous bus route in the city", following several crimes such as the killing of a B46 bus driver in 2008.

== Route description and service ==
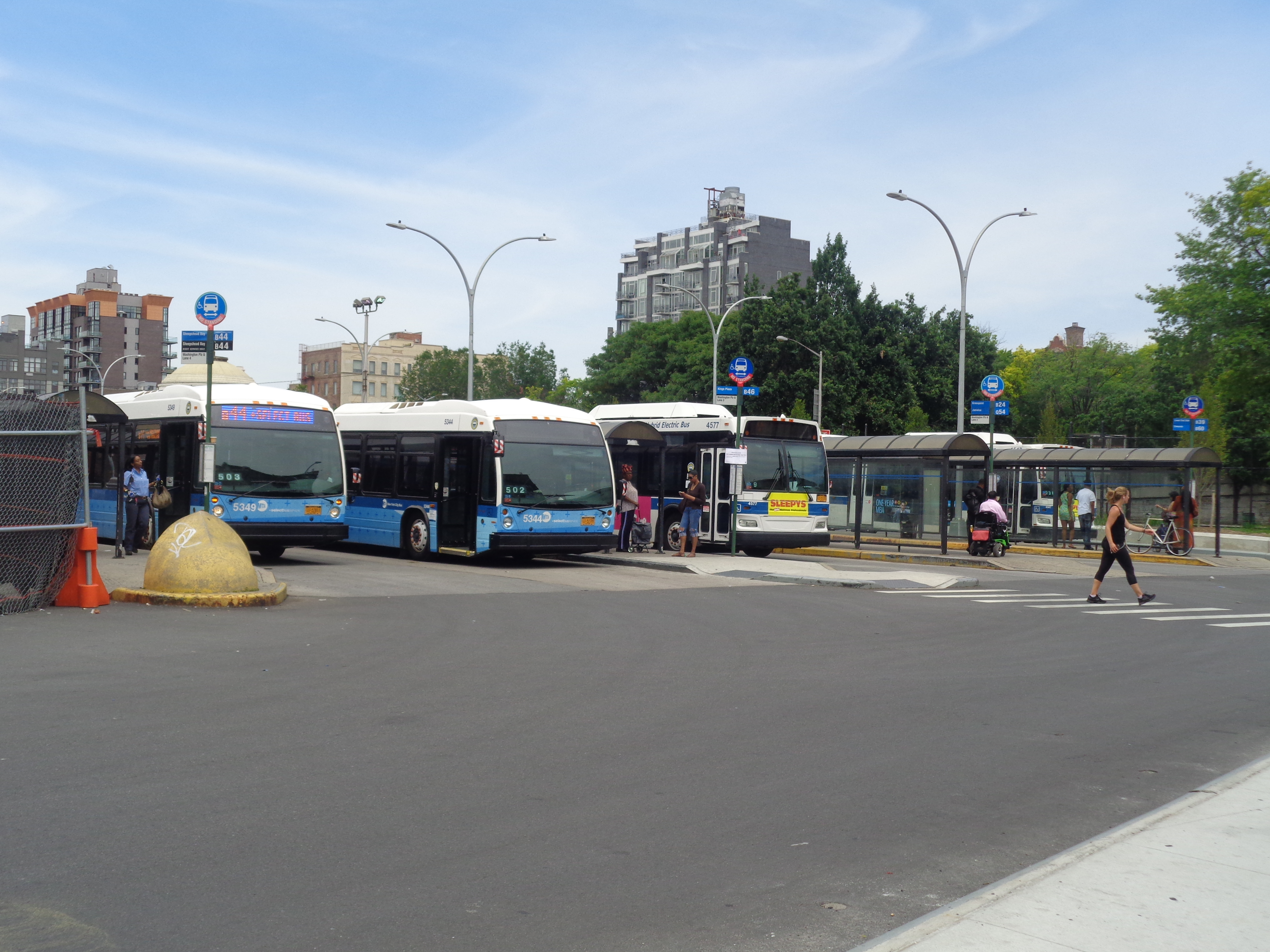
A 2009 Orion VII NG HEV (4577) at the northern terminal of the B46 local, and the former terminal of the streetcar line, the Williamsburg Bridge Plaza Bus Terminal.

=== Streetcar route ===
The Utica−Reid streetcar line began at Avenue N and Utica Avenue in Flatlands, just north of the Flatbush Trolley Depot. It ran north along Utica Avenue to the street's terminus at Fulton Street. It then ran north along Reid Avenue to Broadway, and west along Broadway to the Washington Plaza trolley terminal at the foot of the Williamsburg Bridge. The trackage along Broadway was shared with the Broadway Line. The line had previously continued over the Williamsburg Bridge between 1904 and 1923 and during the 1930s, using the southernmost trolley tracks, to the Essex Street terminal on the Lower East Side of Manhattan.

=== Current bus service ===
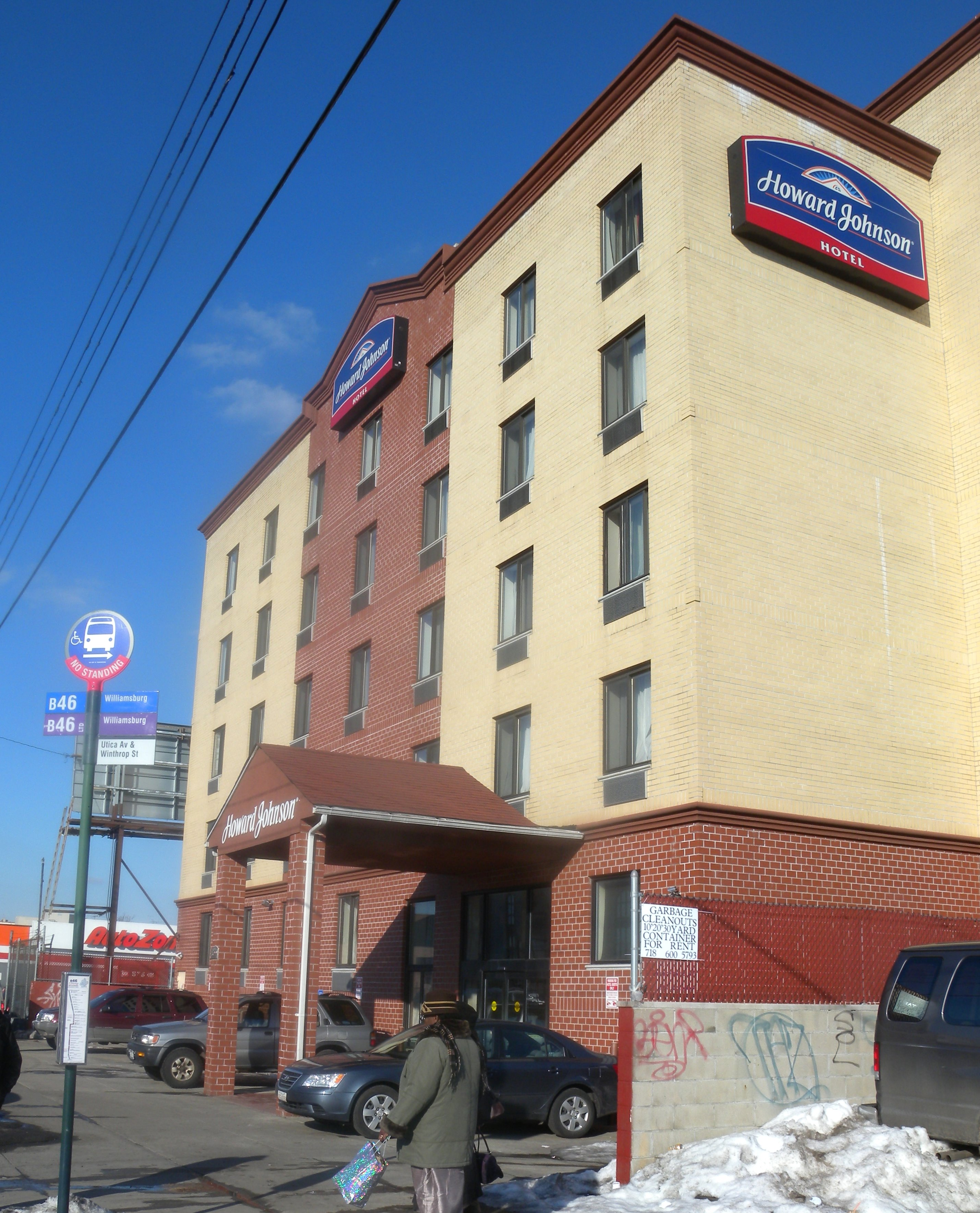
A B46 Williamsburg stop at Howard Johnson Hotel at Utica Avenue/Winthrop Street, before Limited conversion to SBS

The current B46 route begins at the bus terminal of the Kings Plaza shopping center at Flatbush Avenue and Avenue U, on the border of the Mill Basin and Marine Park neighborhoods. After running a short distance on Flatbush Avenue, it turns north onto Utica Avenue, following the trolley route along Utica Avenue, the former Reid Avenue (renamed Malcolm X Boulevard in 1985), and Broadway (underneath the BMT Jamaica Line). The segment on Broadway is shared with the B47. The route terminates at the Williamsburg Bridge Plaza Bus Terminal, which replaced the trolley terminal.

During most hours of the day, seven days a week, the B46 employs limited-stop service along Malcolm X Boulevard, Utica Avenue, and Flatbush Avenue between DeKalb Avenue and Malcolm X Boulevard (near the Kosciuszko Street station of the BMT Jamaica Line), and Kings Plaza, via the B46 Select Bus Service route. The B46 SBS operates between Kings Plaza and DeKalb Avenue only, while the B46 local continues to Williamsburg, making all stops along Broadway. Avenue H, and the Crown Heights – Utica Avenue station at Eastern Parkway serve as short turn terminals for B46 local service, while some B46 SBS buses begin or end service at Avenue N, just north of the Flatbush Bus Depot. The B46 SBS does not operate during early morning and late night hours; during this time, the B46 local covers the entire route between Williamsburg and Kings Plaza.

Prior to SBS implementation in 2016, the service pattern was reversed, in which B46 limited-stop buses would continue to Williamsburg, while B46 local buses terminated at DeKalb Avenue or Eastern Parkway at their northern end, with many buses from both services terminating at Avenue H at their southern end.

The B46 operates out of the Flatbush Bus Depot, which replaced the trolley depot, near Kings Plaza.

==== Fare evasion and safety issues ====
The B46 has been known for various safety issues, including assaults on and harassment of bus drivers and passengers, correlated with high rates of fare evasion (passengers not paying or refusing to pay a fare). The route runs through several high-crime neighborhoods, including Flatlands, East Flatbush, Crown Heights, and Bedford–Stuyvesant. In 2008, it was estimated that there were 4,000 weekly incidents of fare evasion on the B46. The route was also among 10 services that constituted 22% of fare evasion in the city. In 2014, the Metropolitan Transportation Authority (MTA) ranked the B46 route as the "most dangerous and crime-ridden bus route" in terms of fare evasion and on-bus assaults; in the previous year, there were 41 incidents in which drivers of B46 buses were assaulted or harassed.

==== Select Bus Service stops ====
Station Street traveled	Direction	Connections
DeKalb Avenue Malcolm X Boulevard	Northbound terminus, Southbound station	NYC Bus: Q24, B38, B46 Local to Williamsburg Bridge Plaza, B47; NYC Subway: at Kosciuszko Street
Gates Avenue Malcolm X Boulevard	Bidirectional	NYC Bus: B46 Local, B52
Halsey Street Malcolm X Boulevard	Bidirectional	NYC Bus: B26, B46 Local
Fulton Street / Malcolm X Boulevard	Southbound	NYC Bus: B25, B46 Local; NYC Subway: trains at Utica Avenue
Fulton Street / Utica Avenue	Northbound	NYC Bus: B25, B46 Local; NYC Subway: trains at Utica Avenue
Eastern Parkway Utica Avenue	Bidirectional	NYC Bus: B14, B17, B45 (at St. Johns Place), B46 Local; NYC Subway: trains at Crown Heights–Utica Avenue
Empire Boulevard Utica Avenue	Bidirectional	NYC Bus: B12, B17, B46 Local
Winthrop Street Utica Avenue	Bidirectional	NYC Bus: B46 Local
Church Avenue Utica Avenue	Bidirectional	NYC Bus: B35, B46 Local
Avenue D Utica Avenue	Bidirectional	NYC Bus: B8, B46 Local
Avenue H Utica Avenue	Bidirectional	MTA Bus: B103, BM2; NYC Bus: B6, B7 (at Kings Highway), B46 Local
Flatlands Avenue Utica Avenue	Southbound	MTA Bus: BM1; NYC Bus: B46 Local, B82 Local, B82 SBS
Avenue K Utica Avenue	Northbound	MTA Bus: BM1; NYC Bus: B46 Local, B82 Local, B82 SBS
Avenue N Utica Avenue	Bidirectional	NYC Bus: B41, B46 Local
Kings Plaza Mall Flatbush Avenue & Avenue U	Southbound terminus, Northbound station	MTA Bus: Q35; NYC Bus: B2, B3, B9, B41, B46 Local, B47

==== School trippers ====
When school is in session, one local bus departs J.H.S. 078 Roy H. Mann at 2:25pm. The trip heads to Utica Avenue via Avenue N and goes north to terminate at Union Street, located near the Crown Heights-Utica Avenue station. When schools are closed, the same trip operates but starts at Utica Avenue/Avenue N. In addition, three extra SBS buses that terminate at Avenue N in the southbound direction originate at Fulton Street at 2:45, 3:20, and 3:30pm.

== History ==
=== Streetcars ===
The Reid Avenue Line was originally a horse trolley line operated by the Broadway Railroad, running between Broadway Ferry in Williamsburg and Atlantic Avenue just south of Fulton Street. In 1893, the Broadway Railroad was purchased by the Long Island Traction Company, and the line began operations under the subsidiary Brooklyn, Queens County and Suburban Railroad in November of that year. The line was electrified on December 9, 1894. On July 1, 1898, the Brooklyn Rapid Transit Company (BRT) acquired the route.

In May 1900, the Reid Avenue Line was extended south along Utica Avenue to the neighborhood of Rugby (now East Flatbush), in conjunction with housing construction in the neighborhood. During the summer months of 1900, the line terminated at the Holy Cross Cemetery, west of Utica Avenue and south of Church Avenue. On October 15, the line was truncated to Utica Avenue and Church Avenue. Trolley service continued along the Church Avenue Line and Culver Line to Coney Island. After the Williamsburg Bridge opened in 1903, Reid Avenue trolleys began running across the south side of the bridge to Manhattan on November 6, 1904. The line used the trolley terminal at Essex Street at the Manhattan foot of the bridge. On June 1, 1910, the Utica Avenue Line was inaugurated as a shuttle between Church Avenue and Avenue N, connecting with the Flatbush Avenue Line to Bergen Beach. An additional fare was charged for transfer to the Reid Avenue Line. At the time, the town of Flatlands was largely rural farms, and most passengers on the shuttle line were beachgoers.

On December 1, 1923, service on the Reid Avenue Line and all other now-Brooklyn–Manhattan Transit Corporation (BMT) lines over the Williamsburg Bridge ended, due to decreasing profits and a dispute with the city over tolls. Reid Avenue service was truncated to Washington Plaza, and bridge service was replaced with municipal shuttle service. On February 15, 1931, Reid Avenue cars once again began running to Manhattan after municipal shuttle service ended. On July 1, 1937, the Reid and Utica lines were combined into a single-fare service called the "Utica−Reid Line".

=== Bus replacement ===
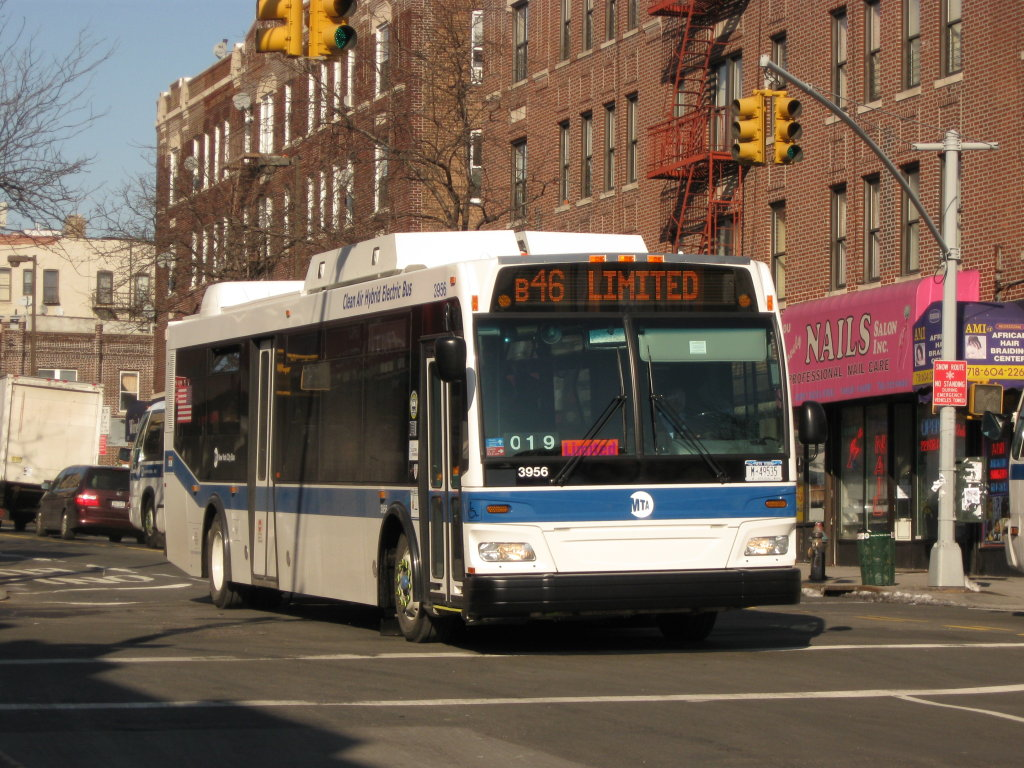
A 2008 Orion VII NG HEV (3956) on the B46 Limited in 2009, prior to SBS implementation

Around this time, many streetcar lines in Brooklyn and the rest of the city began to be replaced by buses, particularly after the unification of the city's three primary transit companies (including the BMT) under municipal operations in June 1940. By 1949, the Utica line was one of eleven remaining streetcar routes in Brooklyn. On January 11, 1951, the New York City Board of Estimate voted unanimously to motorize nearly all the remaining trolley lines in the city, including the Utica−Reid Line. On March 18, 1951, the Utica−Reid Line was replaced by bus service, designated "B-46".

Kings Plaza was opened in September 1970, and the B46 was extended south to the new mall around that time. In the 1980s during summer months, the B46 as well as the B9 were extended south of Kings Plaza across the Marine Parkway–Gil Hodges Memorial Bridge to the Rockaway peninsula in Queens to serve Jacob Riis Park, with a federal subsidy funding the extension.

By 1994, service had decreased by 21% since the late 1980s due to competition from unlicensed van services. As enforcement against such vans was increased in summer 1993, ridership increased by 20%. An aggressive marketing program and the implementation of limited-stop service on the B46 were put into place to better compete with the vans. Limited-stop service was expected to save 6–8 minutes per trip. Limited-stop service was funded as part of the 1994 Fare Deal/Ridership Growth Initiative. To further take back ridership, the Fare Demonstration Program was introduced to the route, making the round trip bus fare $1.50 instead of $2.50, and the round trip intermodal fare $4 instead of $5. Northbound and southbound riders boarding prior to the stop at Eastern Parkway would receive a return ticket for their return trip from the subway stop. Limited-stop service, began on September 12, 1994, running between 6 a.m. and 9:30 a.m. and 3 p.m. and 8 p.m.. Limited-stop service made all stops north of DeKalb Avenue and south of Avenue H. Saturday limited-stop service was added on September 10, 1995, operating between 8 a.m. and 8 p.m.

On December 1, 2008, bus driver Edwin Thomas, who was operating a B46 Limited bus that day, was fatally stabbed by a passenger who did not pay his fare and, as a result, was refused a transfer. It was the first time a New York City bus operator had been killed on the job since an incident on the B44 in 1981, where another bus driver was fatally shot, also because the driver had refused to give the passenger a transfer. The incident led to the strict enforcement of the Metropolitan Transportation Authority (MTA) policy not to confront fare evaders, and installation of Plexiglas partitions on many city buses to protect bus operators; previously drivers were only protected by a single metal bar. The pilot program for the bus partitions began at the Flatbush Depot, where the B46 is dispatched from, in 2009. The same year as Thomas's stabbing, the MTA and New York City Police Department (NYPD) began deploying teams of police officers as well as squads of uniformed and plainclothes transit security officials (called EAGLE teams) on the B46 and other target routes to crack down on fare evaders, in the spirit of the broken windows theory. On February 26, 2014, an NYPD officer was shot in the legs by a fare evader after pulling him off a B46 bus.

=== Select Bus Service ===
In 2004, the Malcolm X Boulevard-Utica Avenue corridor was one of eight Brooklyn bus corridors studied under the city's bus rapid transit (BRT) study. In 2009, the B46 was included in a list of potential routes for the second phase of Select Bus Service (SBS), the city's brand of BRT service. The B46 was identified due to high ridership, isolation from subway service, and slow travel speeds caused by traffic congestion. Under the plan, the then-current local/limited service pattern would be reversed. The B46 Limited would become the B46 SBS, running between Kings Plaza and DeKalb Avenue only. The B46 Local would cover the Broadway portion of the route at all times, due to lower ridership on this section of the line. Limited-stop service would be instituted on the southern portion of the line between Kings Plaza and Avenue H, with local buses covering the stops on this portion of the route.

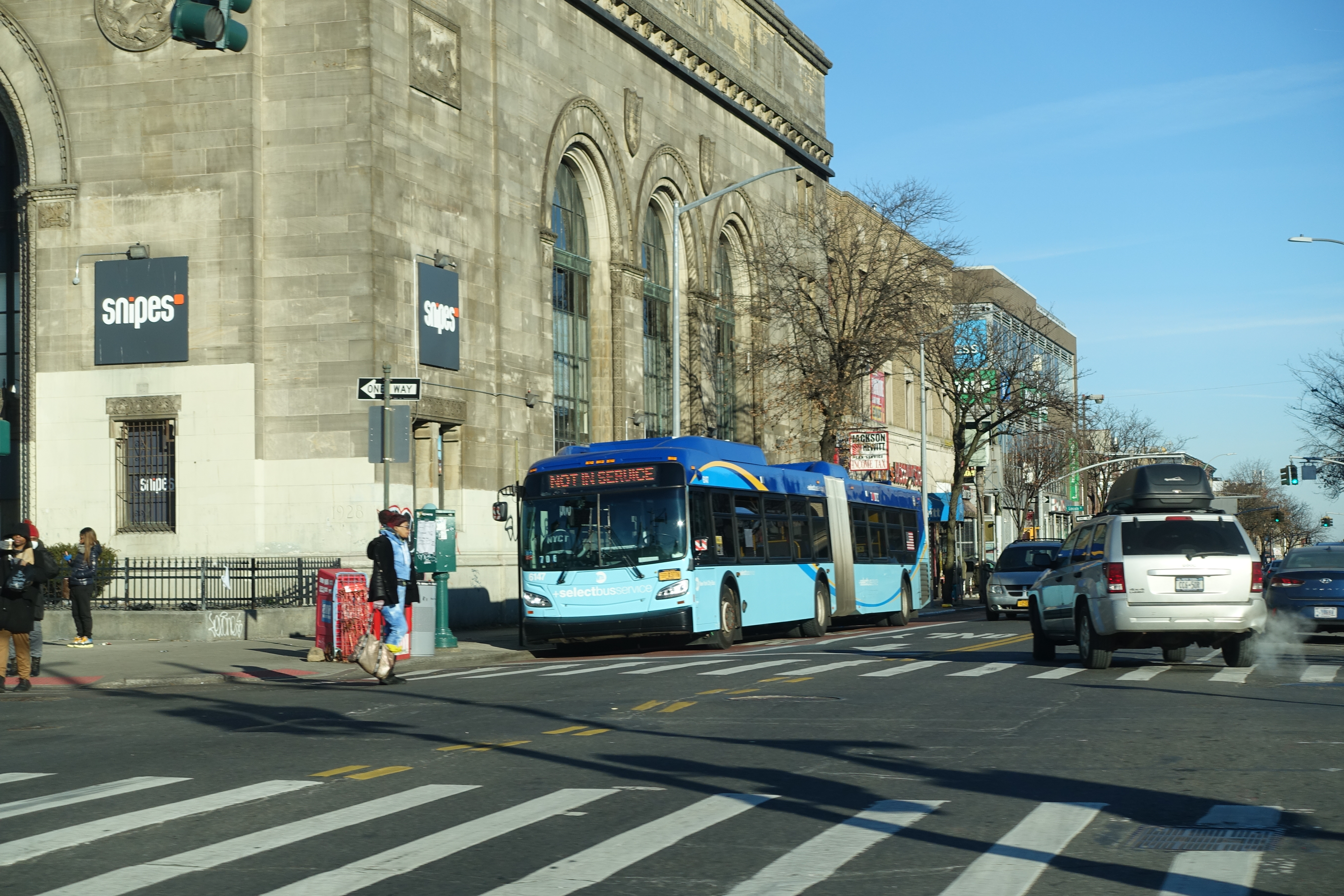
A 2019 XD60 (6147) deadheading on the B46 SBS route at Eastern Parkway/Utica Avenue in January 2022

Preliminary studies and community outreach began in 2011, with around 25 community meetings taking place. In 2014, the first dedicated bus lanes were installed on Utica Avenue between St. Johns Place and Church Avenue, offset from the sidewalk curb. In May 2015, the MTA and the New York City Department of Transportation (DOT) announced plans to implement the B46 SBS in the fall of that year. In the summer of that year, the bus lanes were extended south to Fillmore Avenue. The implementation was pushed back, however, with two other SBS routes (the M86 and Q44) going into service during this time. The B46 Select Bus Service was later announced to begin in spring 2016, then to summer 2016, finally beginning service on July 3, 2016. Initially, the B46 SBS ran with shorter 40-foot-long (12 m) buses, unlike most other Select Bus Service routes, which used longer 60-foot-long (18 m) articulated buses. In late 2019, the MTA indicated that it would start using articulated buses on the route by January 2020 to increase passenger capacity.

=== Bus redesign ===
On December 1, 2022, the MTA released a draft redesign of the Brooklyn bus network. As part of the redesign, B46 local service north of Woodhull Hospital would be discontinued, and closely spaced stops would be eliminated. The B46 SBS's morning rush hour frequencies would be slightly increased, but the route would remain otherwise unchanged.

== Incidents ==
On January 7, 2015, a B46 Limited bus to Williamsburg was at full capacity during the P.M. rush when a fast-pacing BMW crashed into the front of the bus at Clarendon Road. 19 passengers on the bus were slightly injured, while three in the two cars involved were in critical condition.

== Connecting bus routes ==
- B24, B32, B39, B44 SBS, B60, B62, Q54, Q59 (at Williamsburg Bridge Plaza)
- B48 (at Lorimer Street)
- B43 (at Thornton Street/Flushing Avenue)
- B57 (at Flushing Avenue)
- B54 (at Myrtle Avenue)
- B47 (at Malcolm X Boulevard)
- B46 SBS (at DeKalb Avenue)
- B38 (at DeKalb/Lafayette Avenues)
- B52 (at Quincy Street/Gates Avenue)
- B26 (at Halsey Street)
- B25 (at Chauncey/Fulton Streets)
- B15, B65 (at Dean/Bergen Streets; local only)
- B45 (at St. John’s Place; local only)
- B14, B17 (at Eastern Parkway/Union Street)
- B12 (at Montgomery Street/Empire Boulevard)
- B35 (at Church Avenue)
- B8 (at Avenue D)
- B7 (at Glenwood Road/Kings Highway; local only)
- B6, B103, BM2 (at Avenue H)
- B82, B82 SBS, BM1 (at Flatlands Avenue/Avenue K)
- B41 (at Avenue N; Bergen Beach only)
- B100 (at Fillmore Avenue; local only; one block east)
- B2, B9, B41, Q35 (at Flatbush Avenue/Kings Plaza)
- B3 (at Avenue U)
