= Ocean Avenue (Brooklyn) =

Avenue in Brooklyn, New York

- Interactive map of Ocean Avenue
- Maintained by: New York City Department of Transportation
- Location: Brooklyn, New York City
- Postal code: 11225, 11226, 11230, 11235
- Coordinates: 40°37′11″N 73°57′19″W
- South end: Emmons Avenue
- Major junctions: Kings Highway; Church Avenue; Caton Avenue; Parkside Avenue; Empire Boulevard
- North end: Flatbush Avenue (Willink Plaza / Prospect Park)

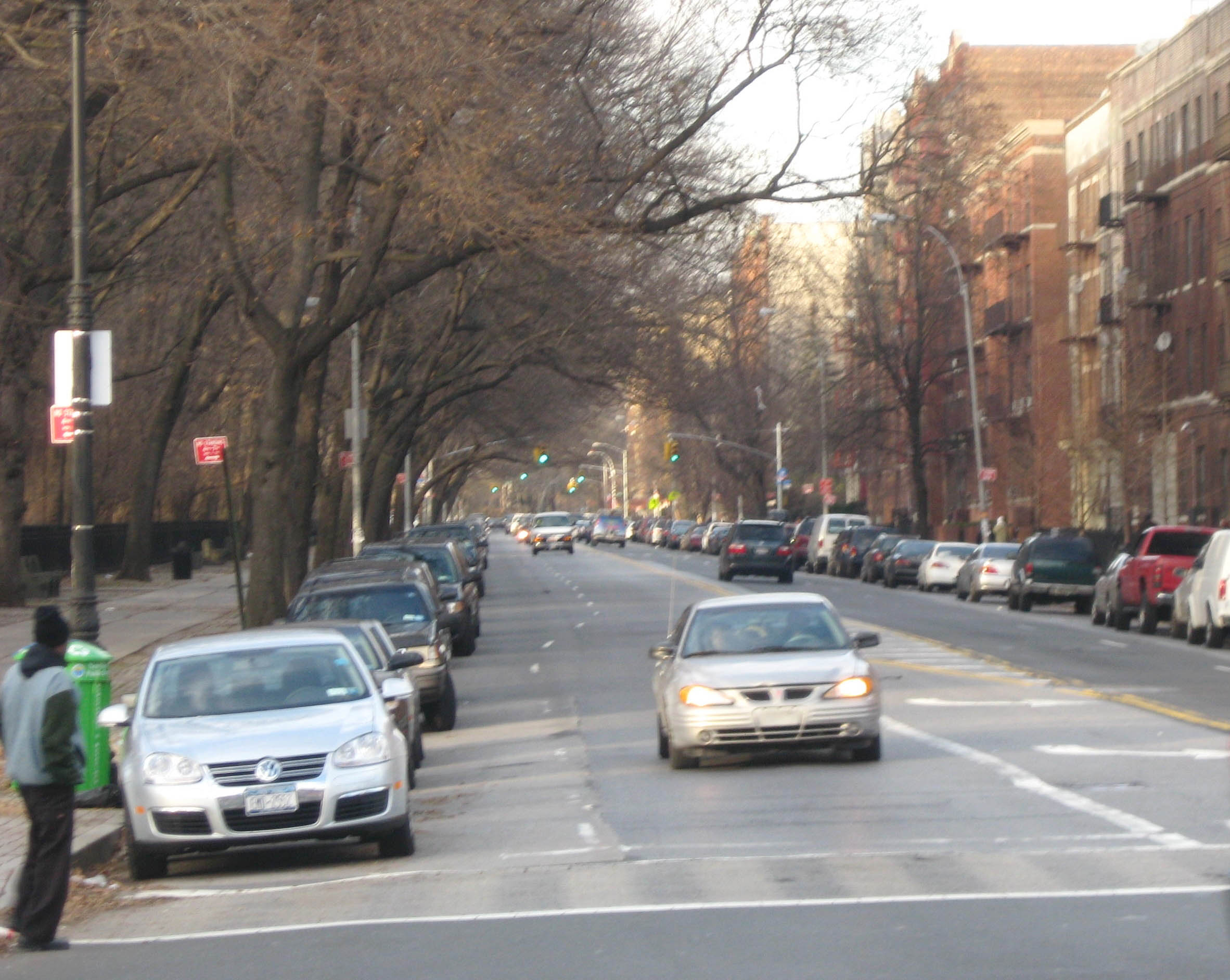
At Parkside Avenue

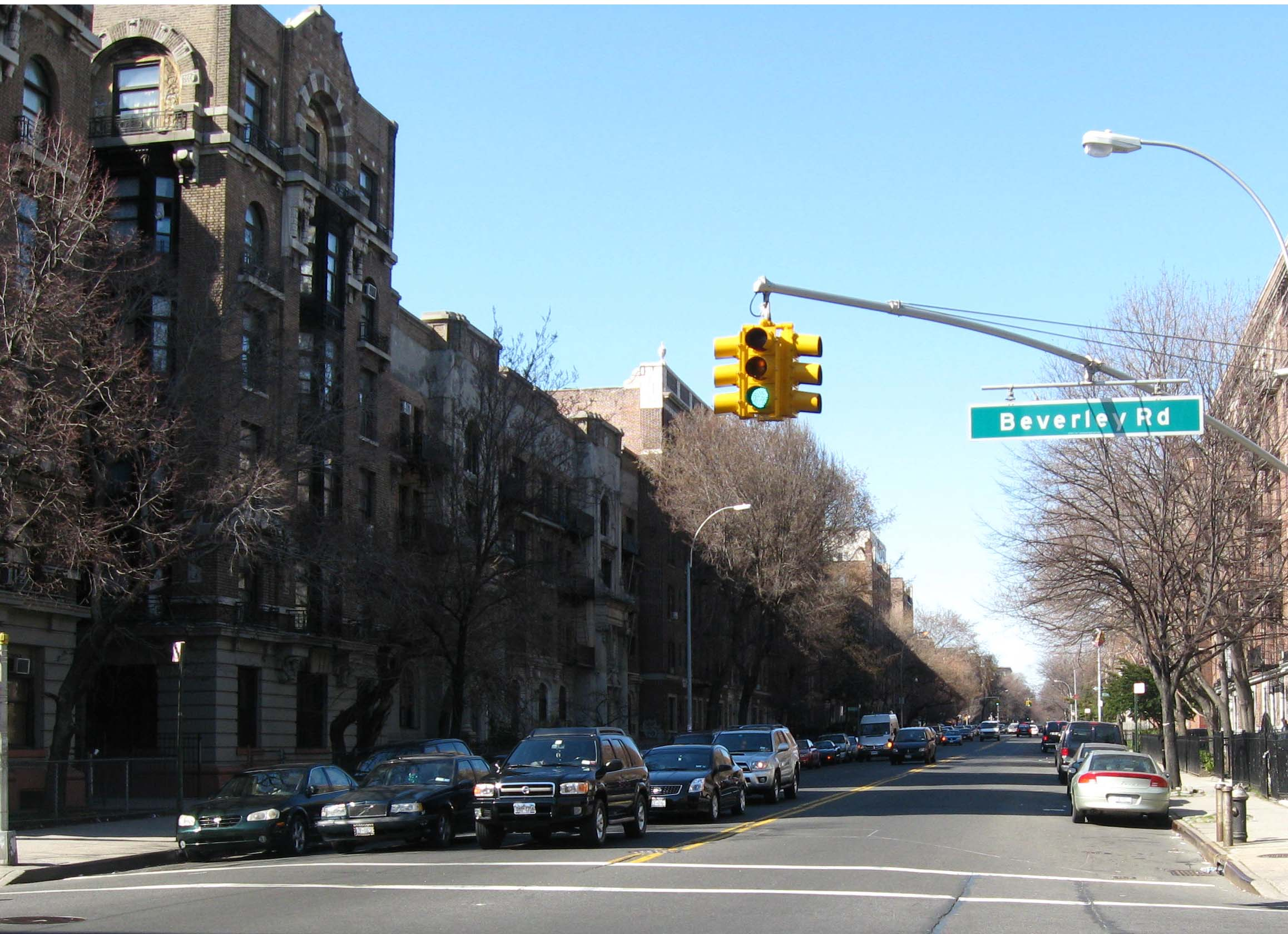
At Beverley Road

Ocean Avenue is a major street in Brooklyn, New York, that runs generally north-south and occupies the position of East 20th Street in the Brooklyn street grid, with East 19th Street to its west and East 21st Street to its east for most of its path. It runs east of and parallel to Ocean Parkway and Coney Island Avenue for most of its route. Except for a short stretch on the Manhattan Beach peninsula, Ocean Avenue starts in the south at Emmons Avenue in Sheepshead Bay just south of the Belt Parkway and continues north, ending at Flatbush Avenue at Willink Plaza after running for several blocks as the eastern edge of Prospect Park. A footbridge across Sheepshead Bay connects the two "Ocean Avenue" sections.

== Public transportation ==
Ocean Avenue is served by the following New York City Bus routes:

- The B4 runs on the corridor south of Avenue Z. Sheepshead Bay service heads east on Shore Parkway.
- The B49 takes over north of Avenue Z, accompanied by the BM3 north of Avenue X, and the BM1 and BM4 north of Avenue K. The B49 serves until Foster Avenue, but all express routes continue until Cortelyou Road.
- Additional service is provided by three Midwood-bound routes. The B2 and B31 run from Avenue R to Quentin Road, then the B100 takes over until Kings Highway.
- The B9 runs between Avenue L and Avenue M.
- The B16 runs north of Caton Avenue, with Bay Ridge service originating at Lincoln Road. Additional service from Prospect Park is also provided by the B43, B48 from Lincoln Road to Empire Boulevard.
- The Lefferts Gardens-bound B12 runs from Woodruff Avenue to Parkside Avenue, where it terminates.

There is also a New York City Subway station at Parkside/Ocean Avenues.
