= Tompkins Avenue station (BMT Lexington Avenue Line) =

Tompkins Ave.

General information
- Location: Lexington Avenue and Tompkins Avenue; Bedford-Stuyvesant, Brooklyn, New York
- Coordinates: 40.6884°N 73.9449°W
- Operator: City of New York (from 1940)
- Line: BMT Lexington Avenue Line
- Platforms: 2 side platforms
- Tracks: 2
- Connections: Tompkins, Marcy, and Ocean Avenue streetcars.

Construction
- Structure type: Elevated

History
- Opened: May 13, 1885; 141 years ago
- Closed: October 13, 1950; 75 years ago

Former services
Preceding station	BMT Lines	Following station
Nostrand Avenue toward Park Row	12: Lexington Avenue	Sumner Avenue toward Eastern Parkway
Location

The Tompkins Avenue station was a station on the demolished BMT Lexington Avenue Line in Brooklyn, New York City. It had two tracks and two side platforms. It was located at the intersection of Lexington Avenue and Tompkins Avenue The station was opened on May 13, 1885, and had connections to the Tompkins Avenue Line, Marcy Avenue Line, and Ocean Avenue Line streetcars. It closed on October 13, 1950. The next southbound stop was Nostrand Avenue. The next northbound stop was Sumner Avenue.
