= B103 (New York City bus) =

Bus route in Brooklyn, New York

b103
- Downtown Brooklyn-Canarsie Line; Avenue H/Avenue M Line
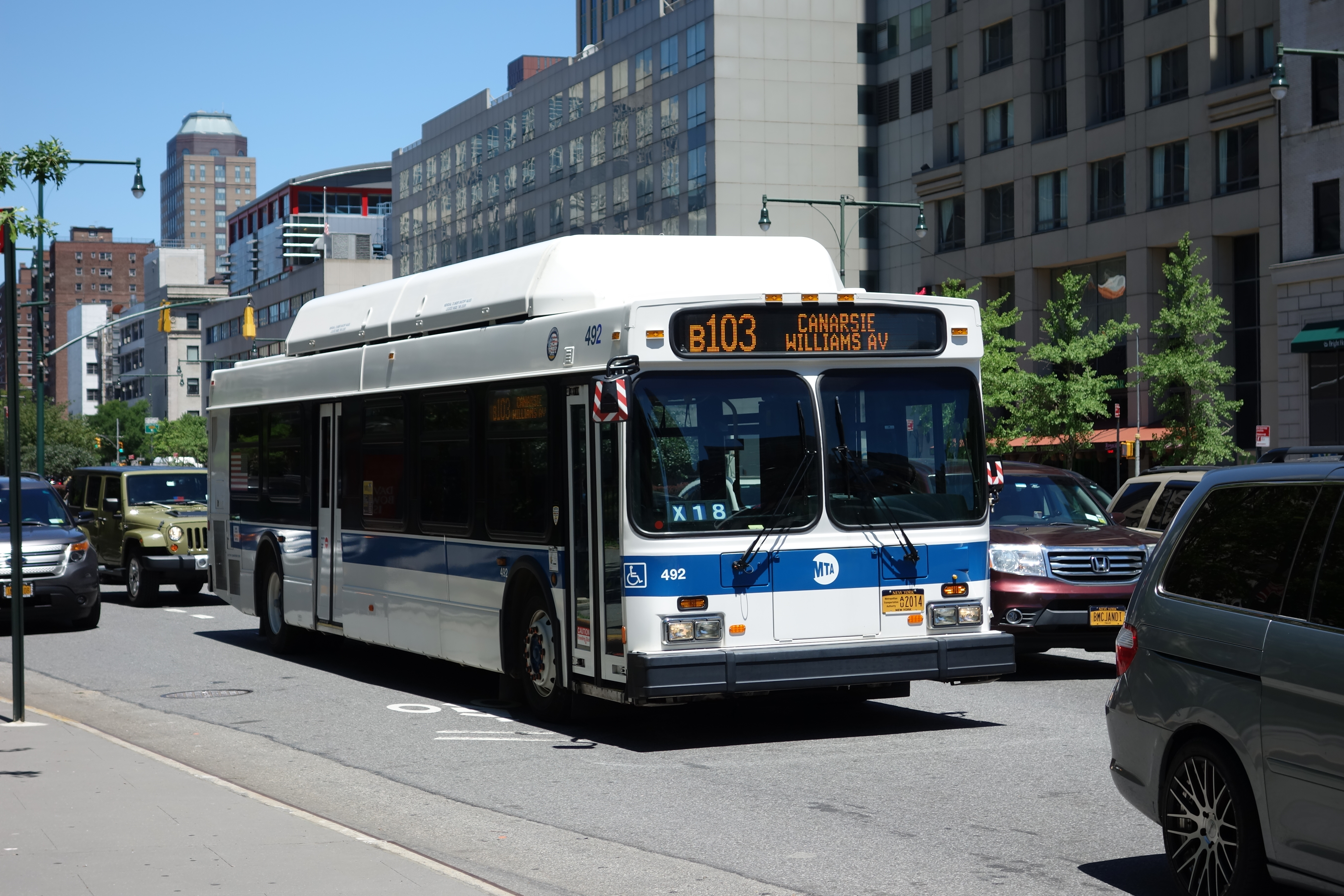
- A 2011 C40LF (492) on the Canarsie-bound B103 Limited at Fulton/Joralemon/Adams Streets & Boerum Place in July 2018

Overview
- System: MTA Regional Bus Operations
- Operator: MTA Bus Company
- Garage: Spring Creek Depot
- Vehicle: New Flyer C40LF CNG
- Began service: June 16, 1986

Route
- Locale: Brooklyn, New York, U.S.
- Communities served: Downtown Brooklyn, Boerum Hill, Windsor Terrace, Kensington, Flatbush, Flatlands, Canarsie
- Start: Downtown Brooklyn - Cadman Plaza West & Tillary Street
- Via: Third Avenue (northbound), Fourth Avenue (southbound), Prospect Expressway, Avenue H, Avenue M
- End: Canarsie – Williams Avenue & Flatlands Avenue
- Length: 11.9 miles (19.2 km)
- Other routes: BM2 Canarsie/Spring Creek/Midtown/Downtown

Service
- Operates: 5:30 AM - 2:30 AM
- Annual patronage: 2,406,812 (2025)
- Transfers: Yes
- Timetable: B103

The B103 constitutes a bus route in the New York City borough of Brooklyn. Originally operated by Command Bus Company, the bus route is now operated by MTA Bus Company, running between Downtown Brooklyn and Canarsie.

== Route description ==
The southbound B103 begins at Tillary Street and Cadman Plaza West and heads east on Tillary Street to Adams Street, where it turns south on Adams Street until Livingston Street, where it turns left there, runs down it until Flatbush Avenue, where it turns right and right again onto 4th Avenue. It continues southbound on 4th Avenue, until 17th Street, which it uses to merge onto the Prospect Expressway and exits onto McDonald Avenue. It continues down McDonald Avenue, then Church Avenue, Coney Island Avenue, and Cortelyou Road until it reaches Flatbush Avenue. It turns south onto Flatbush Avenue and passes through Flatbush Junction. After passing through Flatbush Junction, it turns left onto Avenue H and continues down it as it merges into Glenwood Road, and turns onto East 80th Street, and then turns onto Avenue M until East 105th Street, where it turns north onto said street until Flatlands Avenue, and runs east onto Flatlands Avenue until it turns north on Williams Avenue, where it terminates.

The northbound B103 starts on Flatlands Avenue and Williams Avenue and has the same route as the southbound B103 until Ocean Parkway, where it turns north to merge onto the Prospect Expressway, and exits on Prospect Avenue to turn north onto 3rd Avenue, running on it until its northern end at Schermerhorn Street, and does two left turns onto Flatbush Avenue, and then Livingston Street, where it continues down to Boerum Place and dogleg turns onto Joralemon Street and turns right onto Cadman Plaza West until Johnson Street, where it terminates.

The B103 operates limited-stop service with no definitive local counterpart, with the B6, B37 and B41 all providing local service along different sections of the route. The B103 also employs a short turn service in which half of the runs short turn at Flatbush Junction heading westbound.

== History ==
The B103 bus began service on June 16, 1986. The former terminus was at East 94th Street and Flatlands Avenue and requested trips to Cozine Avenue and Ashford Street.

On December 5, 2005, the MTA Bus Company took over the routes from Command Bus Company, including the B103 bus. In 2006, Saturday service was added.

On April 21, 2008, the B103 stopped operating with a closed-door policy, in which boarding eastbound bus service was only permitted in Downtown Brooklyn, while boarding westbound buses was only permitted between Canarsie and Church Avenue and East 5th Street. Instead, riders would be permitted to alight or board at any stops on the route, like other limited-stop routes.

On November 8, 2008, Canarsie-bound service was rerouted from Third Avenue to Fourth Avenue between Flatbush Avenue and Bergen Street.

The B103 and the BM2 were rerouted and extended to Williams Avenue and Flatlands Avenue on May 4, 2009. The change was made to provide service on a more direct route instead of reversing direction to terminate at Flatlands Avenue and East 94th Street. As part of the change, bus stops at Flatlands Avenue and East 94th Street and Avenue J and East 102nd Street were discontinued, and stops were added at East 105th Street and Flatlands Avenue, and at Flatlands Avenue and Williams Avenue. On September 6, 2009, due to increased ridership, the span of Saturday B103 service was increased, and Sunday service was introduced. Expanded service and extra trips between Brooklyn College and Canarsie was then added on weekdays in 2009, Saturdays in 2010, and Sundays in 2012.

In January 2012, the MTA Board voted to approve a plan to reroute westbound B103 service to operate without stops between Prospect Expressway and Flatbush Avenue, running along Seventh Avenue, Ninth Street, and Fifth Avenue instead of along Third Avenue. The stop at State Street and Third Avenue was discontinued. This change, which took effect on February 26, 2012, was made since traffic along on Third Avenue had become increasingly heavy.

In January 2014, the MTA Board voted to add three stops to the B103 in Gowanus and Boerum Hill, in coordination with the restoration of B37 service along Third Avenue. The stops were added to provide for transfers to and from the B37, which would not go to its prior terminal in Downtown Brooklyn at Livingston Street and Court Street. This change took effect on April 6, 2014.

=== Bus redesign ===
On December 1, 2022, the MTA released a draft redesign of the Brooklyn bus network. As part of the redesign, B103 service would be discontinued west of Flatbush Avenue, and would be extended on its eastern end to the New Lots Avenue station. Closely spaced stops would be eliminated.

== Incidents ==
In August 2020, a bus operator was doing a B103 trip to Canarsie during the P.M. rush when the driver of a reported stolen Toyota ignored a stop sign and collided with the bus at East 87th Street. This led the bus to crash into a BMW, whose driver was injured. Another thirteen were also hurt, including everyone in the stolen vehicle and ten passengers on the bus.
