= B100 (New York City bus) =

Bus route in Brooklyn, New York

b100
- Mill Basin-Midwood Line; Quentin Road/Fillmore Avenue Line
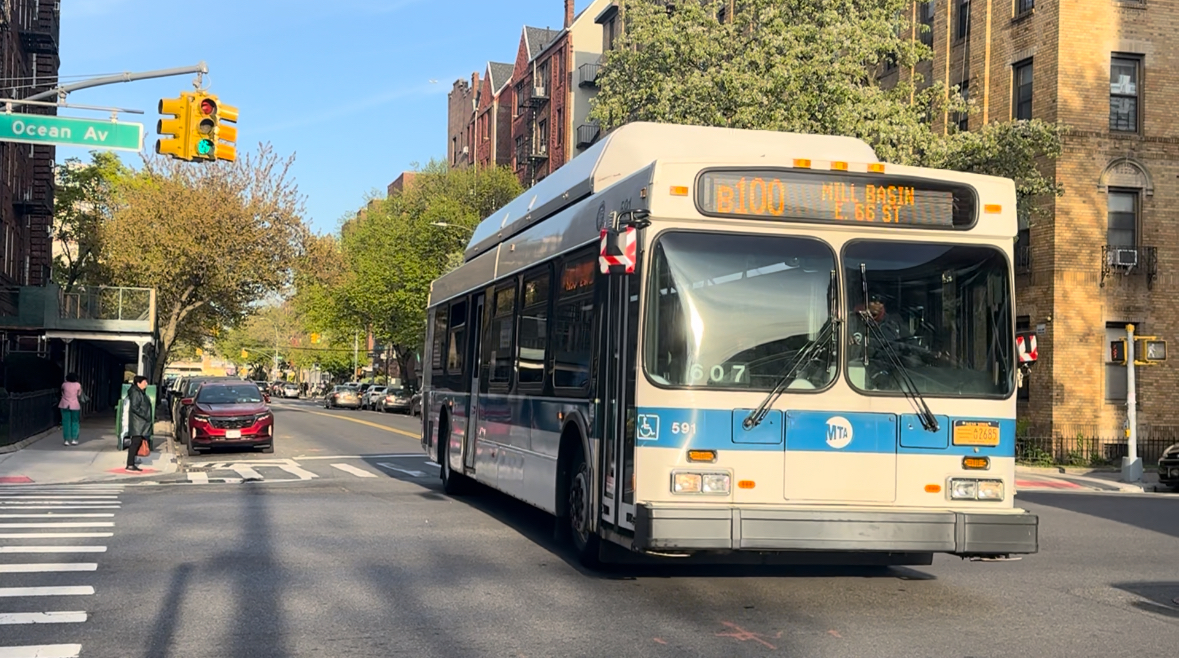
- A 2012 New Flyer C40LF (591) on the Mill Basin-bound B100 at Quentin Road & Ocean Avenue in 2025

Overview
- System: MTA Regional Bus Operations
- Operator: MTA Bus Company
- Garage: Spring Creek Depot
- Vehicle: New Flyer C40LF CNG
- Began service: February 3, 1960

Route
- Locale: Brooklyn, New York, U.S.
- Communities served: Homecrest, Midwood, Marine Park, Flatlands, Mill Basin
- Start: Mill Basin - National Drive & Mill Avenue (last drop-off); 56th Drive & Strickland Avenue (first pick-up)
- Via: Quentin Road, Fillmore Avenue, East 66th Street
- End: Homecrest - East 16th Street and Quentin Road at Kings Highway ( B Q trains)
- Length: 4.3 miles (6.9 km)
- Other routes: BM1 Mill Basin/Midtown/Downtown

Service
- Operates: 5:00 AM - 1:00 AM
- Annual patronage: 1,073,892 (2025)
- Transfers: Yes
- Timetable: B100

The B100 is a bus route in the New York City borough of Brooklyn. Originally operated by Command Bus Company, the bus route is now operated by MTA Bus Company, running between Homecrest and Mill Basin.

== Route description ==
The B100 bus route first starts at East 16th Street and Quentin Road near the Kings Highway subway station through a loop. Then it turns east onto Quentin Road. By the end of the intersection, it continues southeast through Gerritsen Avenue until it merges northeast via Fillmore Avenue. After that, slightly turning to Avenue T, Mill Avenue, and Avenue U. Lastly, it turns down south spirally, and ending through a loop at National Drive and Mill Avenue during a drop-off and 56th Drive and Strickland Avenue during a pick-up.

=== School trippers ===
During the A.M. rush, five extra buses depart the Kings Highway station and terminate at the entrance to James Madison High School on Bedford Avenue. During the P.M. rush, three of the buses return to the station while the remaining trips head east to Mill Basin instead, all originating at the school’s southwest corner. J.H.S. 278 Marine Park is also served, with four buses departing at 2:25pm. One bus heads west to Kings Highway, while the others go east to Mill Basin.

== History ==
It began on February 3, 1960 by Pioneer Bus Company. It was extended from Bassett Avenue to 56th Drive (then called McMullen Drive) in August 1960.

It was later operated by Command Bus Company starting October 22, 1979, due to a long strike at Pioneer Bus Company.

On December 5, 2005, the MTA Bus Company took over the routes from Command Bus Company, including the B100 bus.

=== Bus redesign ===
On December 1, 2022, the MTA released a draft redesign of the Brooklyn bus network. As part of the redesign, the B100 service will be rerouted to use Avenue R instead of Quentin Road, replacing the B2, which will be eliminated. Every bus on the route has been equipped with infoTransit display and audio system, though buses with a screen on the wall do not show subway transfers e.g. BMT Brighton Line. Average stop spacing will be increased from 819 feet to 1,089 feet.

In 2024 the Quentin Road & Ocean Avenue stop was added to improve transfers to the B49 and community demands.

== Connecting bus routes ==
- B2, B7, B31, B82, B82 SBS (at Kings Highway)
- B49, BM3 (at Ocean Avenue)
- B44, B44 SBS, BM4 (at Nostrand Avenue)
- B9, B41, Q35 (at Flatbush Avenue)
- B46, B46 SBS (at Utica Avenue)
- B3, B47 (at Avenue U)
- BM1 (at East 66th Street)

== See also ==
- Command Bus Company
