= Long Island Traction Company =

The Long Island Traction Company was a street railway holding company in Brooklyn and Queens, New York City, United States.

== History ==
In order to get around anti-stock watering statutes, the owners of the Brooklyn City Rail Road, capitalized at $6 million, incorporated the Long Island Traction Company in West Virginia in March 1893 with a capital of $30 million. The BCRR-controlled Brooklyn Heights Railroad, until then the operator of only the short cable-operated Montague Street Line, leased the BCRR on June 6, 1893. The Long Island Traction Company acquired the Broadway Railroad by May 1893, and incorporated the Brooklyn, Queens County and Suburban Railroad on November 24, 1893 to take it over, as well as the Broadway Ferry and Metropolitan Avenue Railroad and Jamaica and Brooklyn Railroad. The increased capitalization was used to convert the companies from horse car to trolley operations.

The Long Island Traction Company went bankrupt in mid-1895 after a January strike. The Brooklyn Rapid Transit Company was incorporated January 18, 1896, and took over the LI Traction Company in early February.

== Controlled lines ==
From the Brooklyn City Rail Road

- Annex Line
- Bowery Bay Line
- Bushwick Line
- Calvary Cemetery Line
- Corona Line
- Court Street Line
- Crosstown Line
- Cypress Hills Line
- Flatbush Avenue Line
- Flushing Avenue Line
- Fulton Street Line
- Furman Street Line
- Gates Avenue Line
- Grand Street Line
- Greenpoint Line
- Hamilton Avenue Line
- Holy Cross Line
- Lorimer Street Line
- Lutheran Cemetery Line
- Meeker Avenue Line
- Myrtle Avenue Line
- Nostrand Avenue Line
- Putnam Avenue Line
- Richmond Hill Line
- Second Avenue Line
- Third Avenue Line
- Tompkins Avenue Line
- Union Avenue Line

From the Brooklyn Heights Railroad

- Montague Street Line

From the Broadway Railroad

- Broadway Line
- Cypress Hills Line
- Ralph Avenue Line
- Reid Avenue Line
- Sumner Avenue Line

From the Broadway Ferry and Metropolitan Avenue Railroad

- Lutheran Cemetery Branch
- Metropolitan Avenue Line

From the Jamaica and Brooklyn Railroad

- Jamaica Line
