= Brooklyn Heights Railroad =

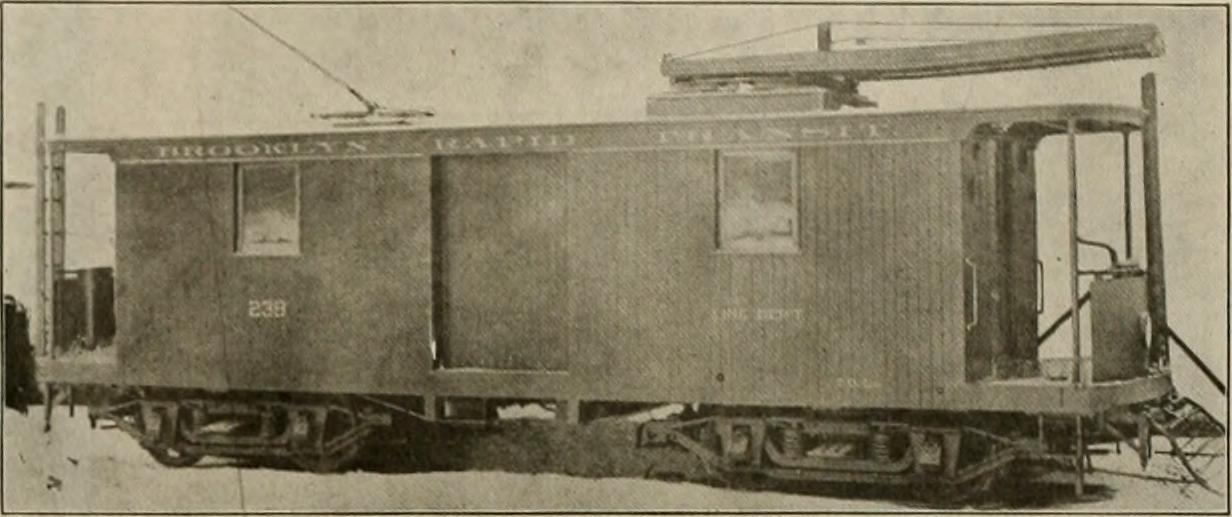
A Brooklyn Heights Railroad tower car from 1891.

The Brooklyn Heights Railroad was a street railway company in the U.S. state of New York. It leased and operated the streetcar lines of the Brooklyn Rapid Transit Company, but started out with the Montague Street Line, a short cable car line connecting the Wall Street Ferry with downtown Brooklyn along Montague Street. The line started operation on July 20, 1891. Eliphalet Williams Bliss owned the railroad.

== Controlled lines ==
According to articles in the Brooklyn Daily Eagle, BHRR included the following lines between 1895 and 1899:

=== B ===
- Bay Ridge Line
- Bath Beach and Bensonhurst Line to Ulmer Park
- Brighton Beach Line
- Bergen Beach Line
- Bowery Bay Line
- Broadway Line
- Broadway and Jamaica Avenue Line
- Brooklyn Hills Line
- Bushwick-Meeker Line
- Bushwick Avenue Line

=== C ===
- Calvary Cemetery Line
- Corona Line
- Court Street Line
- Crosstown Line
- Coney Island and Brighton Beach Line
- Cypress Hills Line
- Cypress Hills Extension

=== E ===
- East New York Line

=== F ===
- Flatbush Avenue Line
- Flushing Avenue Line
- Forest Park Line
- Fort Hamilton Line
- Fresh Pond Line
- Fulton Street Line
- Furman Street Line

=== G ===
- Gates Avenue Line
- Glendale Line
- Graham Avenue Line
- Grand Street Line
- Greene and Gates Avenues Line
- Greenpoint Line

=== H ===
- Hamilton Avenue Line
- Holy Cross Cemetery Line

=== J ===
- Jamaica Line

=== K ===
- Kingston Avenue Line

=== L ===
- Lorimer Street Line
- Lutheran Cemetery Line

=== M ===
- Manhattan and Nassau Avenues Line
- Meeker Avenue Line
- Meeker Street Line
- Metropolitan Avenue Line
- Montague Street Line
- Myrtle Avenue Line

=== N ===
- Nassau Avenue Line
- Nostrand Avenue Line

=== P ===
- Putnam Avenue Line
- Putnam Avenue and Halsey Street Line

=== R ===
- Reid Avenue Line
- Ralph Avenue Line
- Richmond Hill and Jamaica Line
- Ridgewood Line

=== S ===
- Sea Beach Line to Coney Island
- Second Avenue Line
- Sumner Avenue Line

=== T ===
- Third Avenue Line to Fort Hamilton and Bensonhurst
- Tompkins Avenue Line

=== U ===
- Union Avenue Line
- Utica Avenue Line

The railroad also partially owned the Bridge Operating Company, a line across the Williamsburg Bridge that was also owned by New York Railways.
