= B15 (New York City bus) =

Bus route in Brooklyn, New York

b15
- Marcus Garvey Boulevard / New Lots Avenue Line
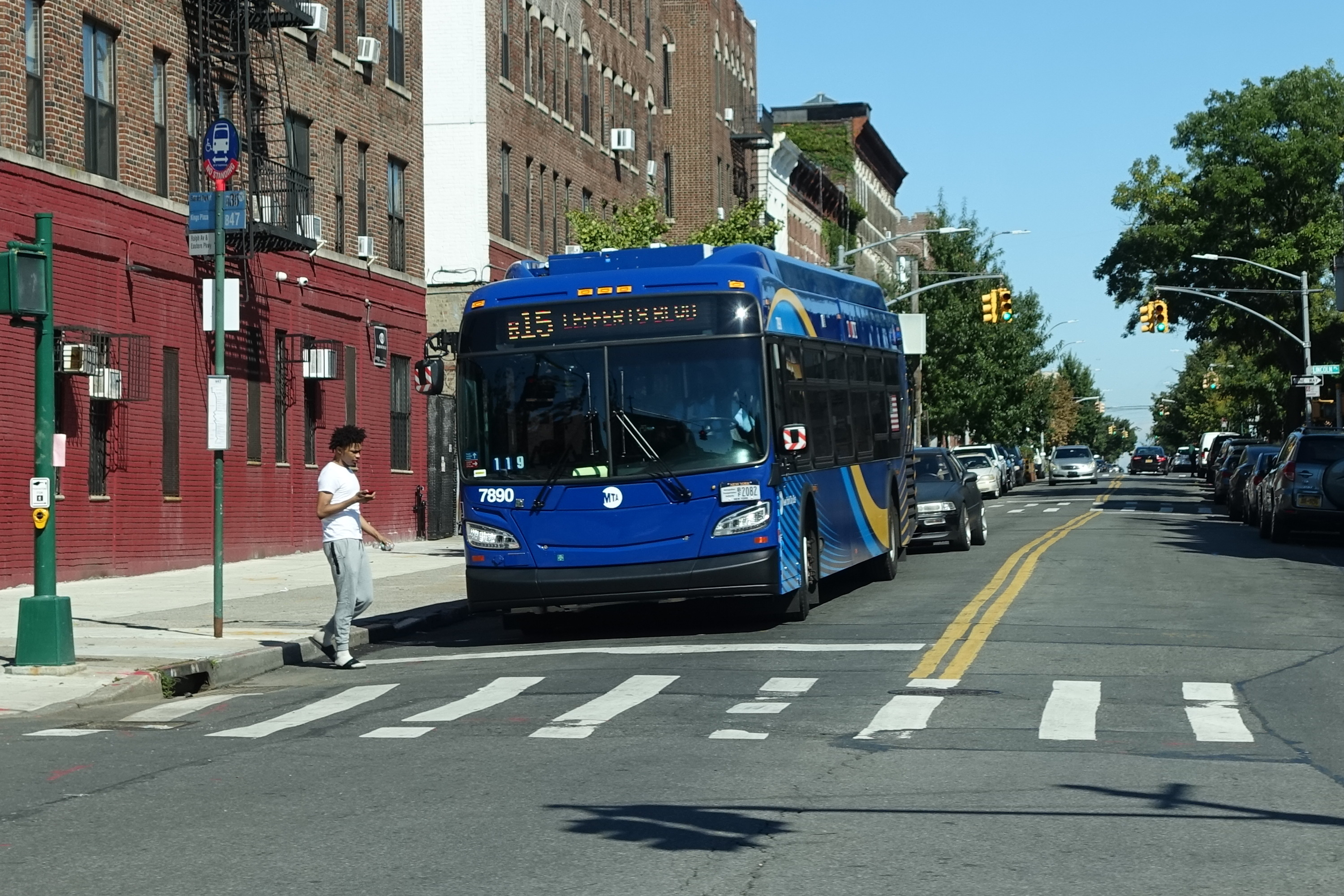
- A 2022 XD40 (7890) on the Lefferts Boulevard-bound B15 at Ralph Avenue/Eastern Parkway in Brooklyn in September 2022, due to construction at JFK Airport.

Overview
- System: MTA Regional Bus Operations
- Operator: New York City Transit Authority
- Garage: East New York Depot
- Vehicle: New Flyer Xcelsior XD40; New Flyer Xcelsior XDE40; New Flyer Xcelsior XE40; Orion VII NG HEV

Route
- Locale: Brooklyn and Queens, New York, U.S.
- Communities served: Bedford–Stuyvesant, Crown Heights, Ocean Hill, Brownsville, East New York, Lindenwood
- Landmarks served: John F. Kennedy International Airport
- Start: Bedford–Stuyvesant – Woodhull Medical Center
- Via: Marcus Garvey Blvd (southbound) / Lewis Avenue (northbound), East 98th Street, New Lots Avenue, Linden Boulevard, Conduit Avenue
- End: John F. Kennedy International Airport – Lefferts Boulevard AirTrain station – or East New York – Linden Boulevard / Drew Street
- Length: 9.5 miles (15.3 km) (eastbound)

Service
- Operates: All times
- Annual patronage: 2,433,144 (2025)
- Transfers: Yes
- Timetable: B15

The B15 Marcus Garvey Boulevard / New Lots Avenue Line is a bus route in Brooklyn, New York City, operated by MTA New York City Bus. The B15 runs through central Brooklyn, originating in Bedford–Stuyvesant at its western end. Most buses continue east to John F. Kennedy International Airport in Queens, but some rush-hour and weekend buses travel only to Spring Creek in Brooklyn.

The B15 was formed from the combinations the Sumner Avenue Line and New Lots Avenue Line were two streetcar lines, running mainly along Marcus Garvey Boulevard (formerly Sumner Avenue), East 98th Street, and New Lots Avenue between northern Bedford–Stuyvesant and New Lots. Originally streetcar lines, the two lines were combined as a bus route in 1947.

== Route description ==
The B15 bus route runs between the Woodhull Medical and Mental Health Center and Flushing Avenue (J and M) subway station in Bedford–Stuyvesant, and John F. Kennedy International Airport's Terminal 5 in Queens. Alternate buses during rush hours and weekends short turn at Drew Street/Elderts Lane on Linden Boulevard in Spring Creek, at the border with Lindenwood, Queens.

The B15 bus route heads south through Bedford–Stuyvesant along Marcus Garvey Boulevard (southbound) and Lewis Avenue (northbound). After crossing Fulton Street, buses use a number of streets through Crown Heights and Ocean Hill, eventually turning south on Ralph Avenue and southeast on East 98th Street. In Brownsville and East New York, buses head east on Hegeman Avenue and New Lots Avenue, then south to Linden Boulevard and merging onto Conduit Avenue after entering Queens. B15 buses then terminate at the AirTrain JFK's Lefferts Boulevard station, within the grounds of John F. Kennedy International Airport.

Between the 1990s and September 2013, the short-turn B15 Spring Creek terminus was a separate branch, directly serving the Brooklyn General Mail Facility via a turnaround loop at the north end of the facility south of Linden Boulevard. The JFK and Postal Facility branches were combined during midday and overnight hours. The loop is still served by terminating B14 and B20 buses, and through B13 service to Wyckoff Heights Medical Center in Bushwick or the Gateway Center in the southern portion of Spring Creek.

Originally named after abolitionist Charles Sumner, Sumner Avenue was renamed Marcus Garvey Avenue in 1987, and later Marcus Garvey Boulevard after Pan-Africanism proponent Marcus Garvey.

== History ==
=== Sumner Avenue Line ===
The Yates Avenue and Flatbush Railroad was organized in 1881 to build a branch of the Broadway Railroad, beginning at Broadway and Yates Avenue (present-day Marcus Garvey Boulevard) in Bedford–Stuyvesant, continuing south on Yates to Fulton Street, then east on Fulton, where it ran over the Brooklyn City Rail Road's Fulton Street Line to Troy Avenue, and continued south on Troy to end at Bergen Street. The Broadway Railroad leased the line on December 31, 1881. The Brooklyn, Queens County and Suburban Railroad, owned by the Long Island Traction Company (later the Brooklyn Rapid Transit Company or BRT), leased the Broadway Railroad in early 1894, and the line was electrified in late October. The BRT would become the Brooklyn–Manhattan Transit Corporation (BMT) in 1923.

=== Conversion to bus service ===
==== 20th century ====
Beginning in the 1920s many streetcar lines in Brooklyn and the rest of the city began to be replaced by buses, particularly after the unification of the city's three primary transit companies (including the BMT) under municipal operations in June 1940. The New Lots Avenue Line was converted to buses in mid-1941, running from the Canarsie Depot at Rockaway Avenue and Hegeman Avenue continuing east along Hegeman Avenue and Linden Boulevard to Atkins Avenue/Berriman Street in East New York. The service was assigned the B10 designation. On July 8, 1947, the B10 was extended to replace Sumner Avenue trolley service. The Sumner route was cut back from Williamsburg Bridge Plaza to its current terminal at Broadway and Sumner Avenue with direct Bedford–Stuyvesant-Red Hook service unreplaced. Sumner trolley service was fully eliminated in 1949.

On September 29, 1963, several Brooklyn streets including Sumner Avenue were turned into one-way streets; Sumner Avenue would become southbound only. Northbound B10 buses were rerouted onto Lewis Avenue at this time. By this time, the B10 had been extended east along Linden Boulevard to Drew Street/Elderts Lane in New Lots/Spring Creek, near the Brooklyn-Queens border. This extension had been proposed around 1960 to serve the Cypress Hills and Louis Heaton Pink public housing complexes in New Lots. The bus would serve Brooklyn General Mail Facility in Spring Creek when it opened in 1991. In 1993, the route was extended to its current terminal at John F. Kennedy International Airport's Terminal 4 in Jamaica, Queens. When the route was extended to Kennedy Airport it was redesignated as the B15 (the previous designation for a route between City Hall and Downtown Brooklyn) to avoid confusion with the Q10, an existing route serving the airport, at the time operated by Green Bus Lines (now part of MTA Bus Company).

==== 21st century ====
On April 11, 2004, 24-hour service was added to the B15 between Brooklyn and JFK Airport. At the same time, service to all JFK terminals except Terminal 4 was replaced by a free transfer to the AirTrain JFK. On October 12, 2009, buses on the B15 were equipped with luggage racks, as part of a ten-bus pilot program on airport bus services to improve passenger flow. On May 30, 2012, due to construction at Terminal 4, the B15 started terminating at a new stop at Terminal 5, near the former Terminal 6. On September 8, 2013, B15 buses stopped directly serving the Brooklyn General Mail Facility loop due to low ridership.

In February 2022, the MTA announced that the B15 branch to JFK would be truncated to the AirTrain JFK's Lefferts Boulevard station the next month on March 27 to accommodate long-term construction at JFK Airport. The changes would remain in effect until at least 2026, when JFK's new Central Terminal Area was completed. The discontinued portion of the B15 would be served by an extension of the Q3 service.

On December 1, 2022, the MTA released a draft redesign of the Brooklyn bus network. As part of the redesign, the B15's eastern terminus would be truncated to Drew Street, while the western terminus would be extended to the Montrose Avenue station at Bushwick Avenue and Montrose Avenue in East Williamsburg. Northbound service in Bedford-Stuyvesant would be rerouted to Kingston and Throop Avenues. Closely-spaced stops would also be removed. The B15's JFK Airport branch, as well as the B35 Limited bus, would be replaced by the B55, a new Crosstown or Select Bus Service route running from Kensington to JFK Airport via Church Avenue, New Lots Avenue, Linden Boulevard, and North and South Conduit Avenue.

== Incidents ==
In the evening of May 18, 2011, a B15 bus operator crashed into a Pontiac SUV at an employee parking area at JFK Airport, killing one Delta luggage carrier and injuring another. The accident also injured nine customers, with six in critical condition, but they were all taken to Jamaica Hospital with a chance at recovery.

On May 28, 2023, a bus operator was doing a short-turn trip to Spring Creek when a Chevrolet crashed into the bus at Essex Street. This was an intersection in which the community has been asking for a traffic light in place of the stop sign. The driver behind the Chevy was held for lacking a valid license after crashing into another vehicle and running the stop sign, which led to the bus crash. A total of 15 were injured, with the passenger of the Chevy in critical condition.

== See also ==
=== Connecting bus routes ===
- B43, B46, B47, B57 (at Flushing Avenue, Woodhull Hospital)
- B54 (at Myrtle Avenue)
- B38 (at DeKalb/Lafayette Avenues)
- B52 (at Gates Avenue)
- B26 (at Halsey Street)
- B25 (at Fulton Street)
- B65 (at Dean/Bergen Streets)
- B46, B46 SBS (at Utica Avenue)
- B45, B47 (at St. John's Place/Ralph Avenue)
- B14 (at Eastern Parkway)
- B12 (at East New York Avenue)
- B7 (at Lenox Road/Riverdale Avenue)
- B35 (at Church Avenue)
- B8, B60 (at Rockaway Avenue)
- B20, B83 (at Pennsylvania Avenue)
- B6, B84 (at Ashford Street)
- Q8, BM5 (at Fountain Avenue)
- B13 (at Euclid Avenue)
- B14 (at Lincoln Avenue/Drew Street)
- Q3, Q10, Q80 (at Lefferts Boulevard AirTrain Station)
