= B60 (New York City bus) =

Bus route in Brooklyn, New York

b60
- Wilson Avenue Line
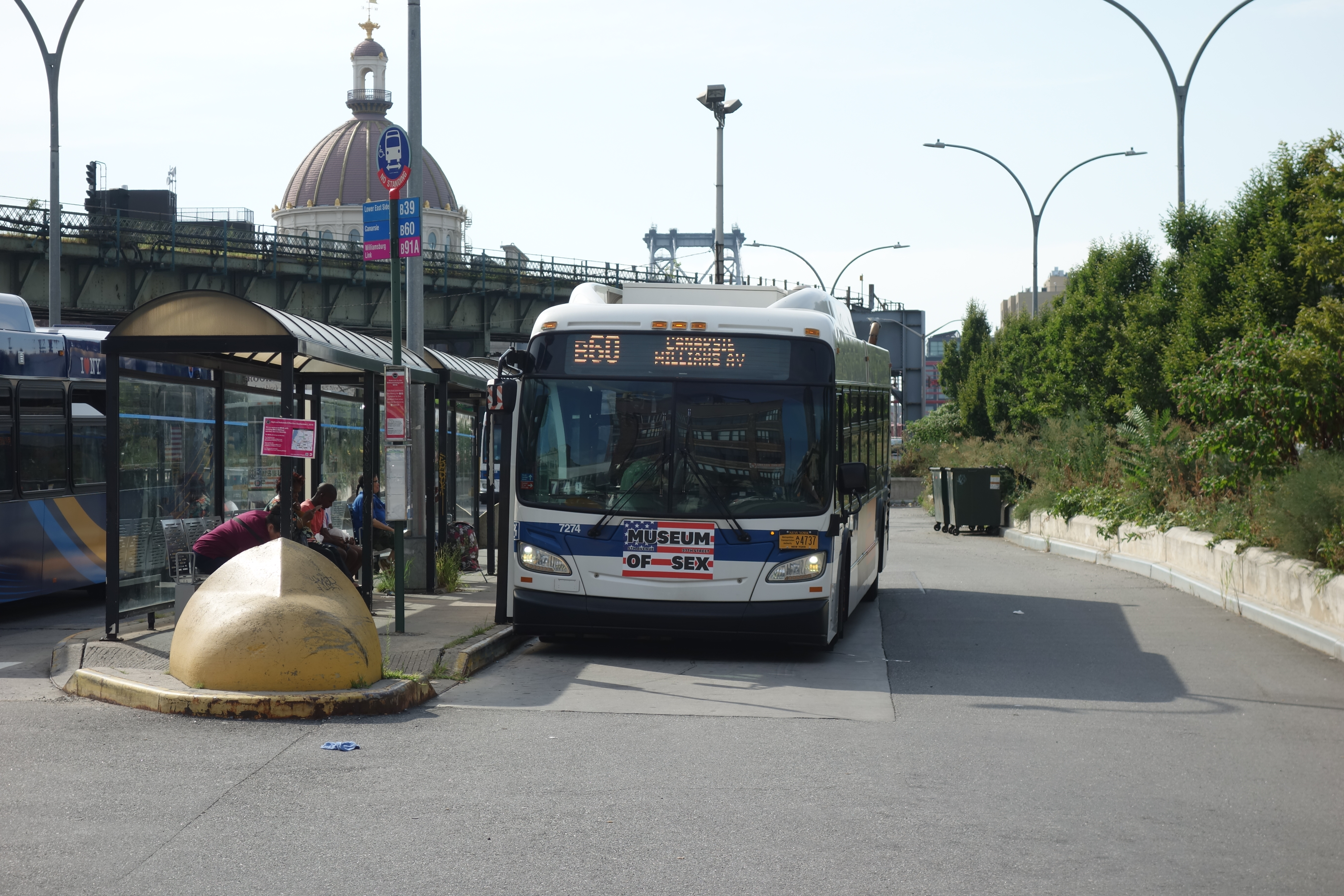
- A 2015 XD40 (7274) on the B60 at Williamsburg Bridge Plaza in August 2019.

Overview
- System: MTA Regional Bus Operations
- Operator: New York City Transit Authority
- Garage: Fresh Pond Depot
- Vehicle: New Flyer Xcelsior XD40
- Predecessors: Wilson Avenue Line

Route
- Locale: Brooklyn, New York, U.S.
- Communities served: Williamsburg, East Williamsburg, Bushwick, Ocean Hill, Brownsville, Canarsie
- Start: Williamsburg – Williamsburg Bridge Plaza Bus Terminal
- Via: Wilson Avenue, Rockaway Avenue
- End: Canarsie – Williams Avenue and Flatlands Avenue
- Length: 8.4 mi (13.5 km)

Service
- Operates: 24 hours
- Annual patronage: 1,467,904 (2025)
- Transfers: Yes
- Timetable: B60

The Wilson Avenue Line is a public transit line in Brooklyn, New York City, running along Wilson Avenue and Rockaway Avenue between Williamsburg and Canarsie. Originally a streetcar line, it is now the B60 bus route, operated by MTA New York City Bus.

== Route description ==
The B60 bus route starts at Williamsburg Bridge Plaza near the Marcy Avenue station. After the subway station, buses head north and use a number of streets through the neighborhood, eventually reaching the Morgan Avenue station on the BMT Canarsie Line. Buses then reach Wilson Avenue and run along the street, parallel to the Canarsie Line until it reaches Decatur and Cooper Streets, near the Wilson Avenue station. Then the route heads south down Decatur and Cooper parallel to the B20 bus, until it reaches Broadway, where the route now heads down Rockaway Avenue. South of Brookdale University Hospital and Medical Center, the B60 enters Canarsie and turns onto Rockaway Parkway. At Rockaway Parkway and Glenwood Road is the Rockaway Parkway terminus of the Canarsie Line and a transfer point to several routes, including the B6, B17, B42 and B82. However, like the B17, the B60 does not have its own dedicated loop and northbound buses stop in front of the station entrance, while southbound service stops on Glenwood Rd at the B6 bus stand. At this point, the B60 continues east along the B6 and B82 routes until East 108th Street, where southbound buses loop around the Breukelen Houses, and ends at Williams Avenue and Flatlands Avenue near the Breukelen Park. Northbound service follows the B82 route to Rockaway Parkway and resumes the regular route. Some southbound buses may terminate at the Rockaway Parkway terminus.

=== School trippers ===
When school is in session, two extra buses to Canarsie originate at Greene Avenue, outside J.H.S. 383 Philippa Schuyler. These buses depart at 2:45 and 2:50pm, respectively.

== History ==
=== As a trolley route ===
The line was built in 1895 by the Nassau Electric Railroad to gain access to Williamsburg and the Williamsburg Bridge into Manhattan, and was known as the Hamburg Avenue Line until Hamburg Avenue was renamed Wilson Avenue during World War I. The line began at Canarsie-Rockaway Parkway on the Canarsie Line and ran north and west along Rockaway Parkway, Rockaway Avenue, Cooper Street, Wilson Avenue, Morgan Avenue, Johnson Avenue, and Broadway to the bridge. Later, eastbound traffic from the bridge was rerouted to use the Bushwick Avenue Line (South 4th Street, Meserole Street, and Bushwick Avenue) to the crossing of Bushwick and Johnson Avenues, and westbound Bushwick Avenue cars were moved to the Wilson Avenue Line.

=== As a bus route ===
Buses were substituted for streetcars on May 27, 1951 and the route was designated the B60. The only route change was that northbound buses were rerouted to run via Decatur Street instead of Cooper Street between Broadway and Wilson Avenue. As of 2025, the B60 is assigned to the Fresh Pond Depot; it was previously assigned to the Grand Avenue Depot except in 2019.

On December 1, 2022, the MTA released a draft redesign of the Brooklyn bus network. As part of the redesign, the B60 would be split in half at Fulton Street. The southern half would keep the B60 designation, and the northern half would take the new B66 designation. At Fulton Street, both routes would run east along Fulton Street to terminate at Broadway Junction. The B60 would use Flatlands Avenue in both directions in Canarsie, and the B66 would use Cooper Street in both directions in Bushwick. Closely spaced stops would also be eliminated. A new B76 bus route would also run along Rockaway Avenue during rush hours, following the B60 route between Broadway Junction and Flatlands Avenue, continuing down to Avenue L, before heading west along it and taking over the B17 Paerdegat branch.

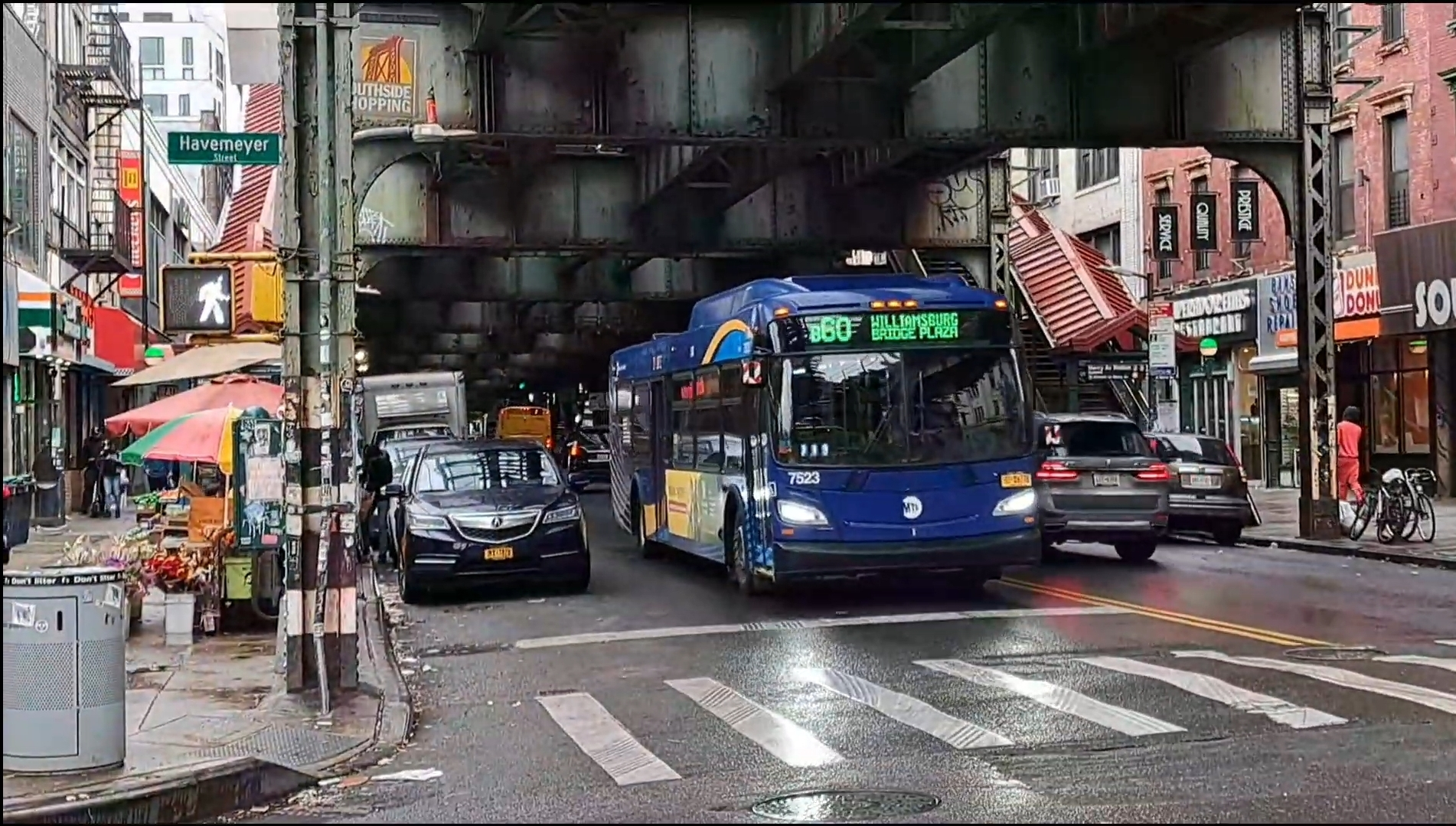
A 2018 XD40 (7523) on the B60 approaching Williamsburg Bridge Plaza, during the route’s fare-free program

As part of a pilot program by the MTA to make five bus routes free (one in each borough), the B60 was selected alongside the Bx18, M116, Q4 and S46/96 to become fare-free in July 2023. The pilot program would last six to twelve months and buses would display a "Fare Free" sign, similar to the one used on the Q70. The pilot was only supposed to run from September 24, 2023 until March 30, 2024, but it was extended in March 2024 to run until further notice. Though ten U.S. Congress members requested in April 2024 that the state government provide additional funding for the fare-free pilot program, state lawmakers declined to reauthorize funding for the program. The fare-free program ended on August 31, 2024.

== Incidents ==
On February 1, 2021, a bus operator was doing an early-morning B60 trip to Canarsie when another driver ran a red light at Linden Boulevard and crashed into the bus. The accident left some injuries, of which those in the car were hurried to Brookdale Hospital, with two in critical condition.

== See also ==
=== Connecting bus routes ===
- B24, B32, B39, B44 SBS, B46, B62, Q54, Q59 (at Williamsburg Bridge Plaza)
- B48 (at Lorimer Street)
- B43 (at Graham Avenue)
- B57 (at Flushing Avenue)
- B38 (at DeKalb Avenue)
- B54 (at Myrtle Avenue)
- B52 (at Gates Avenue)
- B26 (at Halsey Street)
- B20 (at Schaefer/Decatur Streets)
- Q24 (at Broadway)
- B25 (at Fulton Street)
- B12 (at East New York Avenue)
- B14 (at Pitkin Avenue)
- B8, B35 (at Hegeman Avenue)
- B6, B17, B42, B82, B82 SBS (at Glenwood Road)
- B82, B103, BM2 (at Flatlands Avenue)
