= Union Avenue Line =

Union Avenue Line may refer to:

- Union Avenue Line (Baltimore)
- Union Avenue Line (Brooklyn)
