= B33 =

B33 may refer to:

- Bundesstraße 33, a German road
- Strathalbyn Road, a road in South Australia
- XB-33 Super Marauder, an experimental aircraft
- Horsehead Nebula, astronomical designation B33
- Avia B-33, a Czech built Ilyushin Il-10
- B33 (New York City bus), a former bus route in New York City
