= B48 (New York City bus) =

Bus route in Brooklyn, New York

b48
- Lorimer Street/Franklin/Classon Avenues
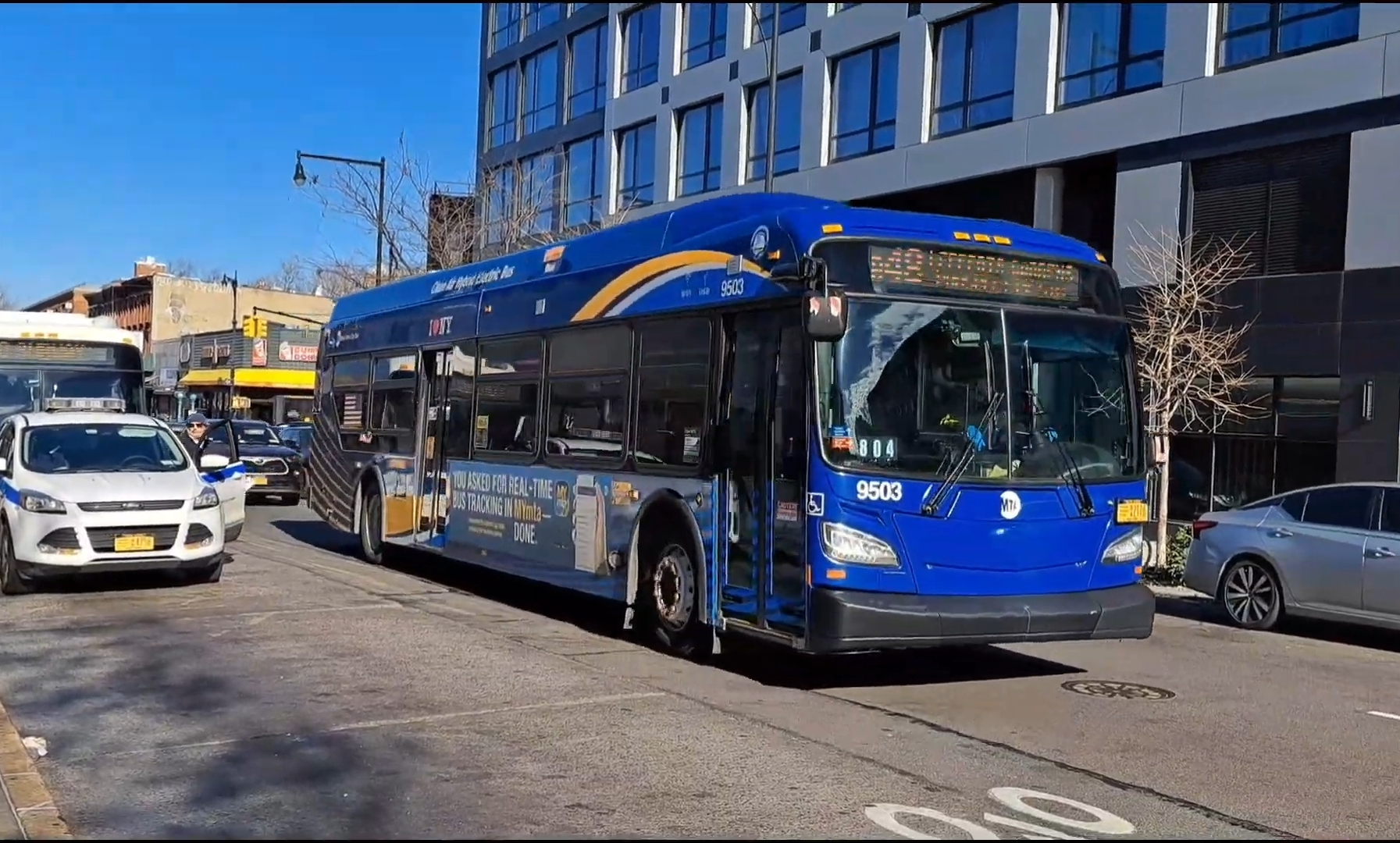
- A 2018 New Flyer XDE40 (9503) on the Lefferts Gardens-bound B48 at Franklin Avenue and Fulton Street

Overview
- System: MTA Regional Bus Operations
- Operator: New York City Transit Authority
- Garage: Grand Avenue Depot
- Vehicle: New Flyer Xcelsior XD40; New Flyer Xcelsior XDE40; New Flyer Xcelsior XE40
- Began service: November 6, 1884 (streetcar service); December 14, 1947 (bus service)

Route
- Locale: Brooklyn, New York, U.S.
- Communities served: Greenpoint, Williamsburg, Bedford–Stuyvesant, Crown Heights, Clinton Hill, Prospect Lefferts Gardens
- Landmarks served: Brooklyn Museum of Art, Brooklyn Botanic Garden, Prospect Park
- Start: Prospect Lefferts Gardens – Ocean Avenue and Flatbush Avenue / Prospect Park
- Via: Classon/Franklin Avenues, Lorimer Street, Nassau Avenue
- End: Greenpoint – Meeker Avenue and Gardner Avenue
- Length: 6.1 miles (9.8 km)
- Other routes: B43 Graham/Tompkins/Throop Avenues

Service
- Operates: 24 hours
- Annual patronage: 699,049 (2025)
- Transfers: Yes
- Timetable: B48

The B48 bus route constitutes a public transit line in Brooklyn, New York City, running along Lorimer Street, Franklin Avenue, and Classon Avenue between Flatbush and Greenpoint. Originally the Lorimer Street streetcar line, it is now a bus route operated by MTA New York City Bus.

== Route description ==
The B48 bus route starts at Lincoln Road and Flatbush Avenue in Prospect Lefferts Gardens, near Prospect Park Station. From there, buses head north on Classon Avenue and south on Franklin Avenue through Crown Heights and Bedford–Stuyvesant to Flushing Avenue. Once it reaches Flushing Avenue, the B48 turns onto Wallabout Street and Flushing Avenue and then heads north on Lorimer Street. From there, buses run along the length of Lorimer Street until Nassau Avenue. The route then shifts onto Nassau Avenue, and heads east on that street until it ends at Meeker Avenue and Stewart Avenue in Greenpoint, near the Newtown Creek.

== History ==
=== Trolley service ===
The Greenpoint and Lorimer Street Railroad was incorporated on November 6, 1884 to operate along the New Williamsburgh and Flatbush Railroad (Nostrand Avenue Line) from the Broadway Ferry in Williamsburg southeast to Lorimer Street, and then north on Lorimer Street, east on Driggs Avenue, north on Manhattan Avenue, west on Meserole Avenue, north on Franklin Street, and west on Greenpoint Avenue to the Greenpoint Ferry; southbound cars would use Nassau Avenue to Lorimer Street. In addition to the NW&F, this route used the tracks of several other companies: the Brooklyn Crosstown Railroad's Crosstown Line on Driggs Avenue and Manhattan Avenue, the Brooklyn City Rail Road's Greenpoint Line on Franklin Street, and the Bushwick Railroad's Bushwick Avenue Line on Greenpoint Avenue. The franchise was approved on February 26, 1885, and the line was opened by August. In July 1889 the Brooklyn City Rail Road rerouted all cars but one per day (to preserve the charter) from Meserole Avenue to Greenpoint Avenue.

Beginning May 30, 1896, the Lorimer Street Line was extended southeast from Prospect Park along the Flatbush Avenue Line and new Bergen Beach Line to Bergen Beach during the summer season.

On October 28, 1945, Lorimer Street cars were extended on both their northern and southern ends to replace discontinued service on the Franklin Avenue Line and on the Nassau Avenue Line. Lorimer Street service was rerouted on its northern end to absorb the Nassau Avenue Line east of Manhattan Avenue, ending at Meeker Avenue and Varick Avenue. On its southern end, service on the Franklin Avenue Line was replaced with Lorimer service rerouted to cut west on the Flushing Avenue Line, south on Franklin Avenue, west on Empire Boulevard, south on Ocean Avenue, and west on Parkside Avenue to Park Circle and Coney Island Avenue.

=== Bus service ===
Buses replaced streetcars on December 14, 1947, which were then replaced with trolley buses on March 23, 1949. Buses replaced trolley buses on July 27, 1960, and service was rerouted off Flushing Avenue between Nostrand Avenue and Franklin Avenue and onto Wallabout Street and Franklin Avenue. The route now runs northbound on Classon Avenue rather than Franklin Avenue; the south end was truncated back to the east side of Prospect Park. From 2010 to 2013, it was further truncated to the Franklin Avenue station in Bedford–Stuyvesant. On January 6, 2019, the B13, B48, B57 and the B60 buses were moved from the Grand Avenue Depot in Maspeth, Queens to the Fresh Pond Depot in Ridgewood, Queens, but all except the B13 have since moved back to the Grand Avenue Depot on January 19, 2020 (The B60 was moved back to Fresh Pond Depot on June 29, 2025).

On December 1, 2022, the Metropolitan Transportation Authority released a draft redesign of the Brooklyn bus network. As part of the redesign, B69 service north of Flushing Avenue would take over the B48's route to Greenpoint, while the B48 would take over the B69's route north of Flushing Avenue. Closely spaced stops would also be eliminated. In addition, the B48 would no longer operate overnight.

== See also ==
=== Connecting bus routes ===
- B16, B43 (on Lincoln Road)
- B41 (at Flatbush Avenue)
- B45 (at St. John’s/Sterling Places)
- B65 (at Bergen/Dean Streets)
- B49 (at Atlantic Avenue)
- B25 (at Fulton Street)
- B26 (at Putnam Avenue)
- B52 (at Gates/Greene Avenues)
- B38 (at Lafayette/DeKalb Avenues)
- B54 (at Myrtle Avenue)
- B57, B62 (at Flushing Avenue)
- B44 SBS (at Bedford/Lee Avenues)
- B46 (at Broadway)
- B60 (at Montrose Avenue/Meserole Street)
- Q54, Q59 (at Grand Street)
- B24 (at Metropolitan Avenue)
- B43, B62 (at Driggs/Nassau Avenues)
