= Brooklyn City Railroad =

Defunct NYC-based streetcar operator

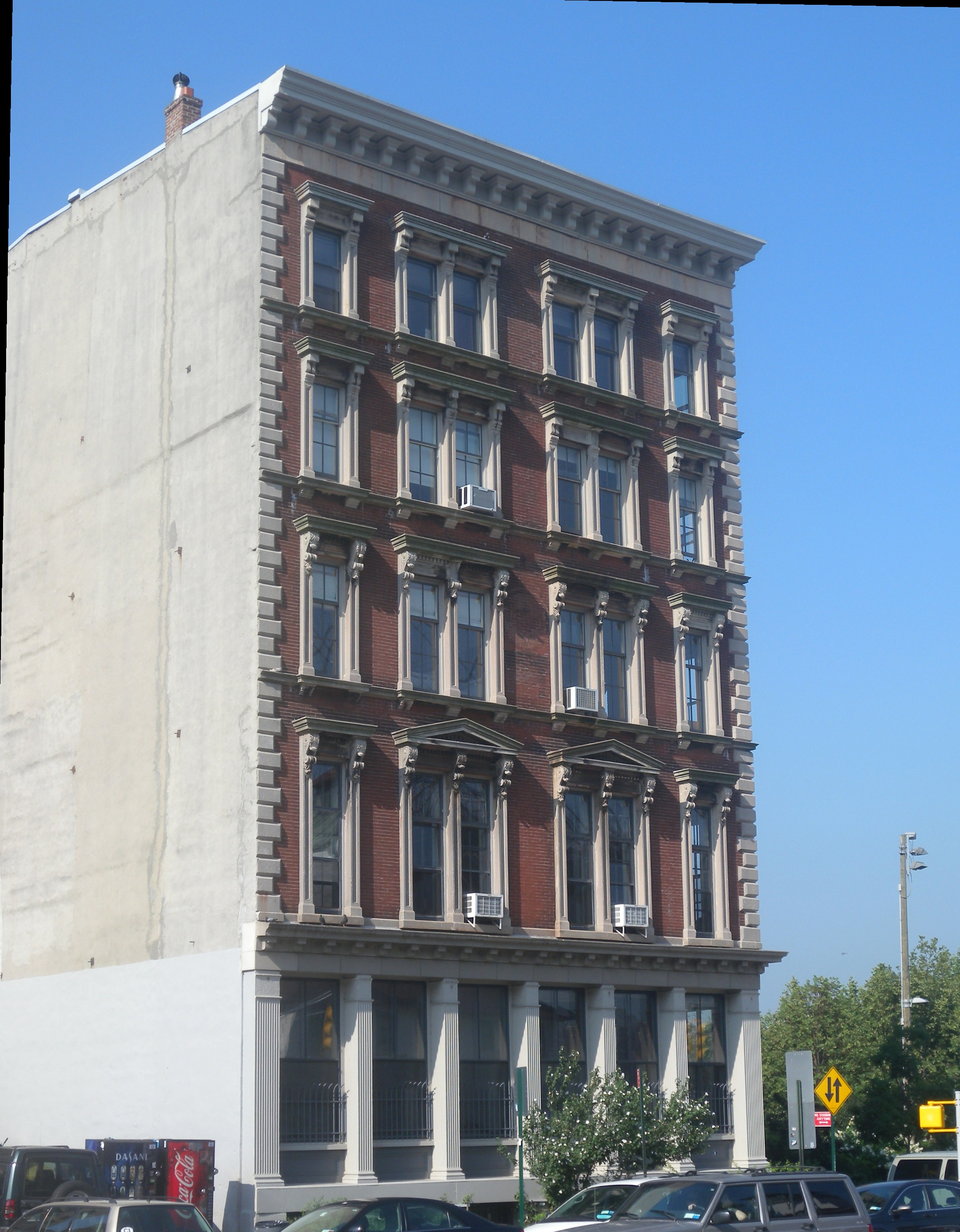
Headquarters building

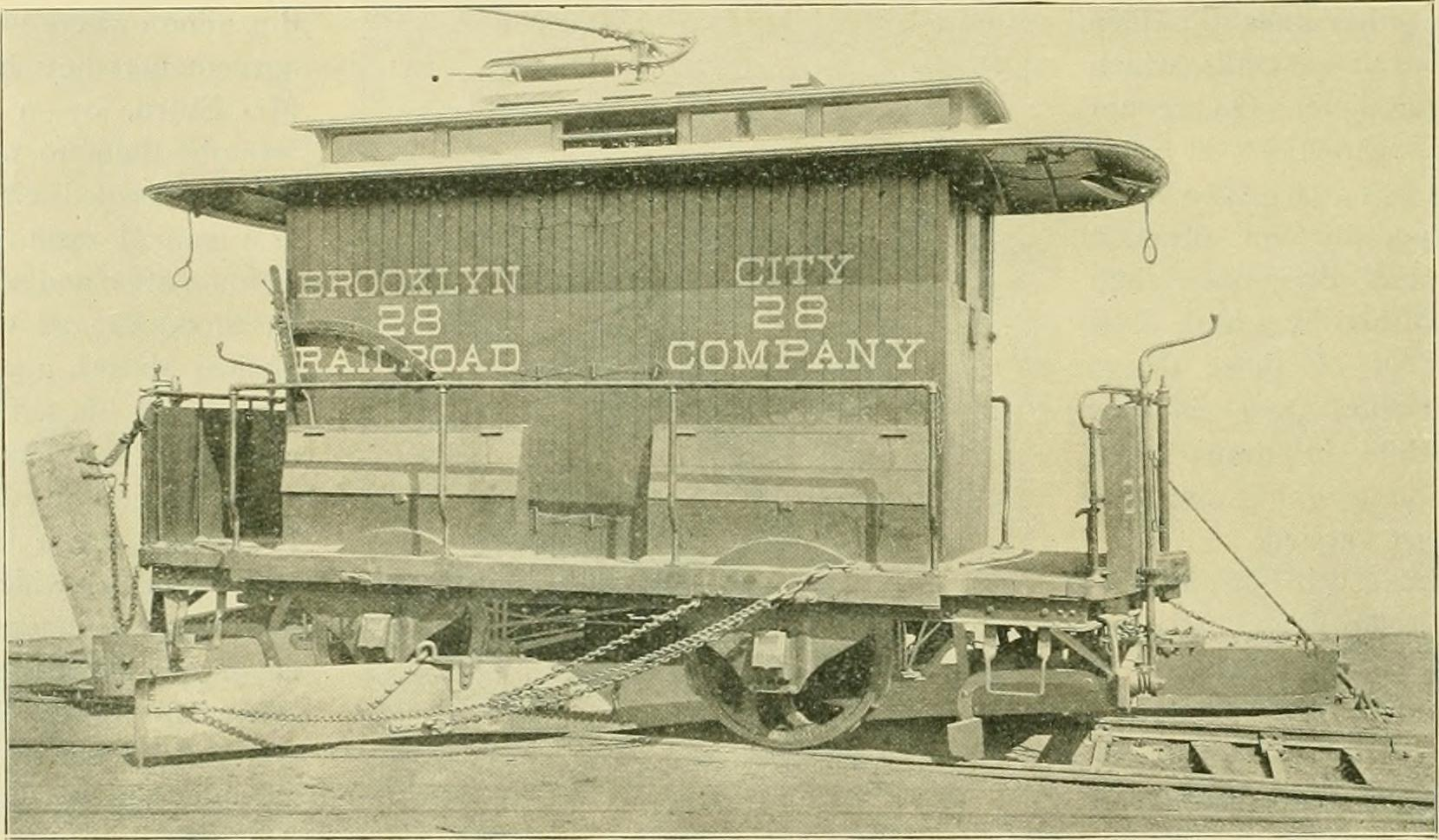
1891 image of a Brooklyn City Railroad snowplow.

The Brooklyn City Railroad (BCRR) was the oldest and one of the largest operators of streetcars (horsecars and later trolleys) in the City of Brooklyn, New York, continuing in that role when Brooklyn became a borough of New York City in 1898.

== Incorporation and first line ==
The BCRR was incorporated on December 17, 1853 (172 years ago), with capital of $2,500,000, a large sum in those days. Its first line, the Myrtle Avenue Line, was the first horsecar line in Brooklyn, and opened on July 3, 1854 (171 years ago). The line operated from Fulton Ferry via Fulton Street and Myrtle Avenue to the former stagecoach stables at Marcy Avenue. The New York State Legislature permitted it to reduce its capital to $1,000,000 in 1855.

== List of lines ==
The following lines were operated by the BCRR at the time of its 1893 lease to the BHRR:

- Court Street Line, Brooklyn Bridge to Red Hook
- Flatbush Avenue Line, Fulton Ferry to Flatbush
- Fulton Street Line, Fulton Ferry to East New York
- Furman Street Line, Fulton Ferry to Hamilton Avenue Ferry
- Gates Avenue Line, Fulton Ferry to Ridgewood
- Graham Avenue Line, Fulton Ferry to Greenpoint Ferry
- Greenpoint Line, Fulton Ferry to Greenpoint
- Hamilton Avenue Line, Hamilton Avenue Ferry to Greenwood Cemetery
- Myrtle Avenue Line, Fulton Ferry to Bushwick
- Putnam Avenue Line, Fulton Ferry to Ocean Hill
- Third Avenue Line, Fulton Ferry to Fort Hamilton

Built after the consolidations began

- Bowery Bay Line, Ridgewood to North Beach
- Corona Line, Ridgewood to Corona
- Flatbush Avenue Line, Flatbush to Flatlands
- Flushing Avenue Line, Bushwick to Maspeth
- Richmond Hill Line, Ridgewood to Richmond Hill
- Union Avenue Line, Greenpoint to Ridgewood

From the Bushwick Railroad, leased July 26, 1888

- Bushwick Line, Williamsburg to Ridgewood
- Cypress Hills Line, Ridgewood to Cypress Hills Cemetery
- Lutheran Cemetery Line, Ridgewood to Lutheran Cemetery
- Tompkins Avenue Line, Williamsburg to Crown Heights

From the Brooklyn Crosstown Railroad and its leased Calvary Cemetery, Greenpoint and Brooklyn Railroad, leased July 30, 1889

- Annex Line, Long Island City
- Calvary Cemetery Line, Greenpoint to Calvary Cemetery
- Crosstown Line, Red Hook to Greenpoint
- Union Avenue Line, Downtown Brooklyn to Greenpoint

From the New Williamsburgh and Flatbush Railroad and its leased Greenpoint and Lorimer Street Railroad, leased July 31, 1889

- Holy Cross Line, Prospect Lefferts Gardens to Holy Cross Cemetery
- Lorimer Street Line, Greenpoint to Prospect Lefferts Gardens
- Nostrand Avenue Line, Williamsburg to Prospect Lefferts Gardens

From the Grand Street and Newtown Railroad, leased April 29, 1890

- Grand Street Line, Williamsburg to Maspeth
- Meeker Avenue Line, Williamsburg to Penny Bridge

From the South Brooklyn Street Railway, leased April 24, 1891

- Second Avenue Line, Sunset Park to Gravesend

== Electrification ==
The Fort Hamilton and Hamilton Avenue lines were the first selected to have electric traction installed.

== Leased to Brooklyn Heights Railroad ==
In 1893, the Long Island Traction Company (LIT), a holding company, acquired the Brooklyn Heights Railroad (BHRR), operator of a short cable car line on Montague Street in Brooklyn Heights and used this latter company as its operating arm. The BHRR obtained a 999-year operating lease on the Brooklyn City the same year. By this time the Brooklyn City operated 27 streetcar lines.

== Part of Brooklyn Rapid Transit System ==
The LIT was foreclosed and reorganized in 1895 as the Brooklyn Rapid Transit Company (BRT), which soon acquired, through lease or ownership interests in company's shares, most of the trolley and rapid transit lines in Brooklyn.

The BRT (also known as "the rapid transit company" during its years of acquisition) became the public face of transportation in Brooklyn. Nevertheless, the BRT operated all of its lines through its operating companies, some of which were created just for that purpose, and others that were leased or subsidiaries, such as the Brooklyn City. Patrons may have noticed this in subtle ways, such as that streetcar transfers had the letters "B.C.R.R." imprinted on their face.

== Company revival ==
In 1919, the BRT went into receivership as the result of a number of factors, such as the serious inflation of World War I, and not helped by the Malbone Street Wreck on the Brighton Line, which killed at least 93 people on November 1, 1918.

Though the BRT was bankrupt, the Brooklyn City was declared solvent, and its charter and separate corporate existence were resumed. The lease by the Brooklyn Heights was ended and the lines the BCRR controlled in 1893 and more became its lines again on October 19, 1919. The BCRR had its own crews, cars and carbarns, and even purchased new equipment in its own name, though the overall planning and management was still effectively with the BRT. A negative consequence for passengers was that BCRR lines no longer issued transfers to the lines still with the BRT, and vice versa.

When the BRT was reorganized as the Brooklyn–Manhattan Transit Corporation (BMT) in 1923, the former BRT companies gradually were brought out of receivership. Nevertheless, the Brooklyn City did not become part of the BMT, but remained a separate company until June 1, 1929, when the BMT formed the Brooklyn and Queens Transit Corporation to consolidate all of its surface operations in one operating company, which finally ended the corporate existence of the Brooklyn City.

== See also ==
- List of New York City Landmarks
