= B41 (New York City bus) =

Bus route in Brooklyn, New York

b41 b41
- Flatbush Avenue Line
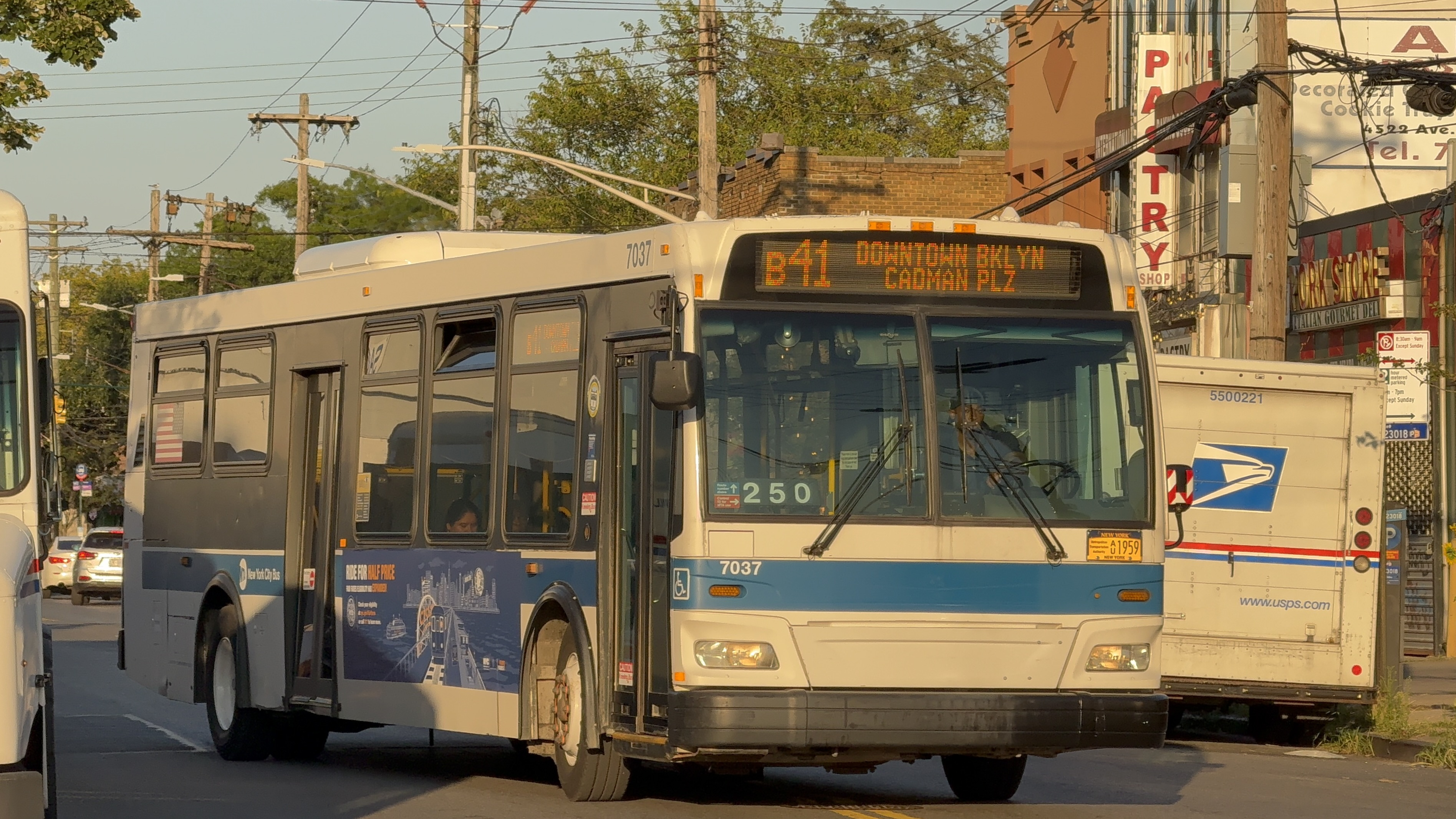
- A 2011 Orion 7 EPA10 (7037) on a Cadman Plaza-bound B41 on Avenue N in Flatlands.

Overview
- System: MTA Regional Bus Operations
- Operator: New York City Transit Authority
- Garage: Flatbush Depot
- Vehicle: Orion VII NG HEV; Orion VII EPA10; New Flyer Xcelsior XD40
- Began service: 1860 (trolley line); March 4, 1951 (bus service); September 14, 1992 (limited-stop service)
- Night-time: Every 30 minutes (buses alternate between each branch)

Route
- Locale: Brooklyn, New York, U.S.
- Start: Downtown Brooklyn – Cadman Plaza
- Via: Flatbush Avenue
- End: Marine Park – Kings Plaza or Bergen Beach – Veterans Avenue
- Length: 7.9 miles (12.7 km) (southbound)
- Other routes: Q35 Flatbush Avenue/Rockaway Beach Boulevard

Service
- Operates: 24 hours; local-only service at night
- Annual patronage: 4,447,078 (2025)
- Transfers: Yes
- Timetable: B41

The B41 is a bus route that constitutes a public transit line operating in Brooklyn, New York City, running along Flatbush Avenue between Downtown Brooklyn and Marine Park. The B41 is operated by the MTA New York City Transit Authority. Its precursor was a streetcar line that began operation in 1860, and was known as the Flatbush Avenue Line. The route became a bus line in 1951. Limited-stop service began along the route, in 1992.

== Route description and service ==
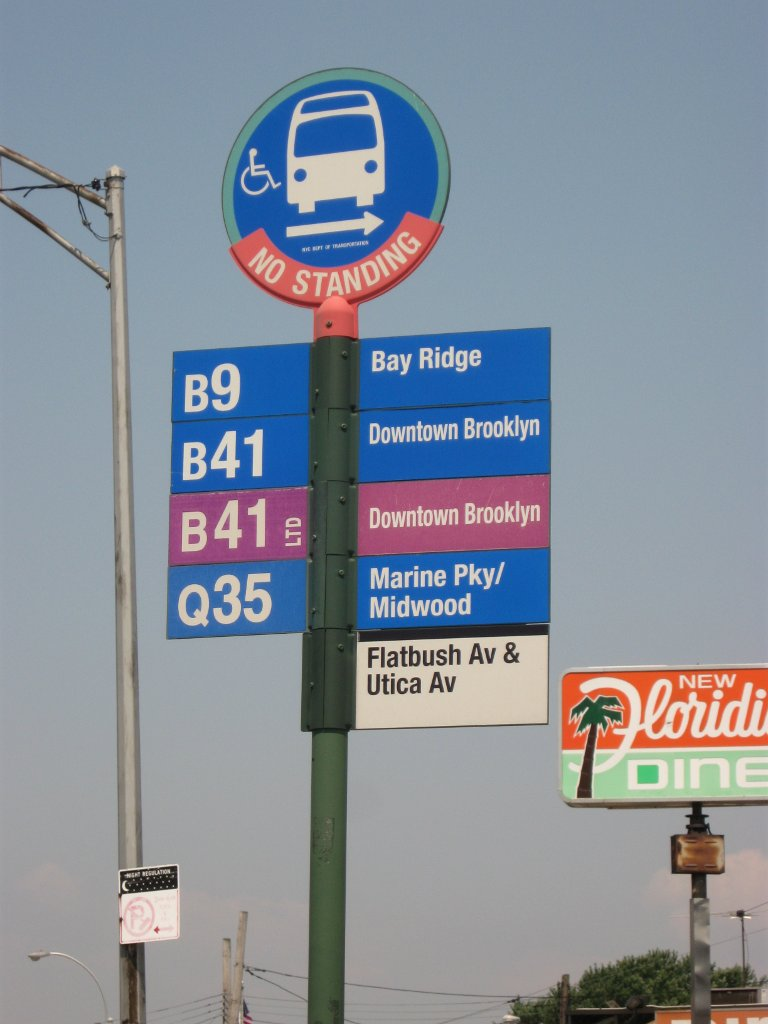
A B41 Downtown Brooklyn bus stop at Flatbush/Utica Avenues, among other routes

Southbound B41 service begins at Downtown Brooklyn at Cadman Plaza West by the Borough Hall station. The bus then runs via Adams Street to Livingston Street, before running via that street until turning onto Flatbush Avenue. Bus service continues southeast via Flatbush Avenue until Avenue P, where service splits into two branches. Most buses continue along Flatbush Avenue to a terminal at Kings Plaza, while the remainder run along Avenue N and Veterans Avenue to a terminal at Veterans Avenue and East 71st Street, near Avenue U, in Bergen Beach.

During the day, the B41 employs limited-stop service between Atlantic Avenue and Avenue P, and local elsewhere. During weekdays, limited stop service operates between Downtown Brooklyn and both of its southern terminals. There is usually more service operating to Kings Plaza than Bergen Beach, especially during off-peak hours. During weekends, all Bergen Beach service is local, with Limited service going to Kings Plaza. During overnight service, the Limited does not run, and the B41 Local alternately serves each southern terminal.

=== School trippers ===
A 2015 XD40 #7363 operating on the Bergen Beach-bound B41 Limited

When school is in session, four extra buses run from Troy Avenue to Empire Boulevard during the A.M. rush.

During P.M. hours, one bus departs for Nostrand Avenue at 2:25pm from J.H.S. 278 Marine Park. The bus heads to Flatbush Avenue via Fillmore Avenue. Three more buses depart from J.H.S. 078 Roy H. Mann onto the Veterans Avenue branch at 2:25, 4:25, and 5:35. The second trip terminates at Church Avenue while the rest terminate at Nostrand.

== History ==
=== As a horsecar and streetcar line ===
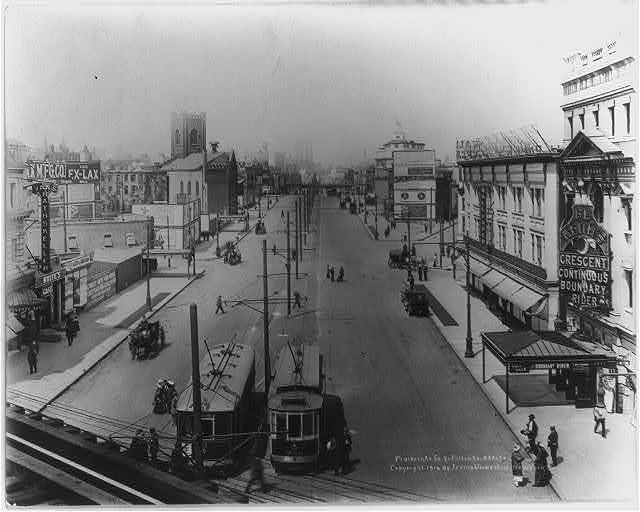
Flatbush Avenue BRT line trolleys as seen from the BMT Fulton Street Line in 1914.

The Brooklyn City Railroad opened the line, a branch of their Fulton Street Line, to the city line on July 14, 1860, and to Vernon Avenue in Flatbush about a week later. The Vernon Avenue Depot was built on the east side of the line at the terminal. The line was later extended to Bergen Beach along Flatbush Avenue and Avenue N, and later still the line along Flatbush Avenue was extended to Avenue U in Marine Park; the older route became the Bergen Beach Shuttle.

=== As a bus line ===
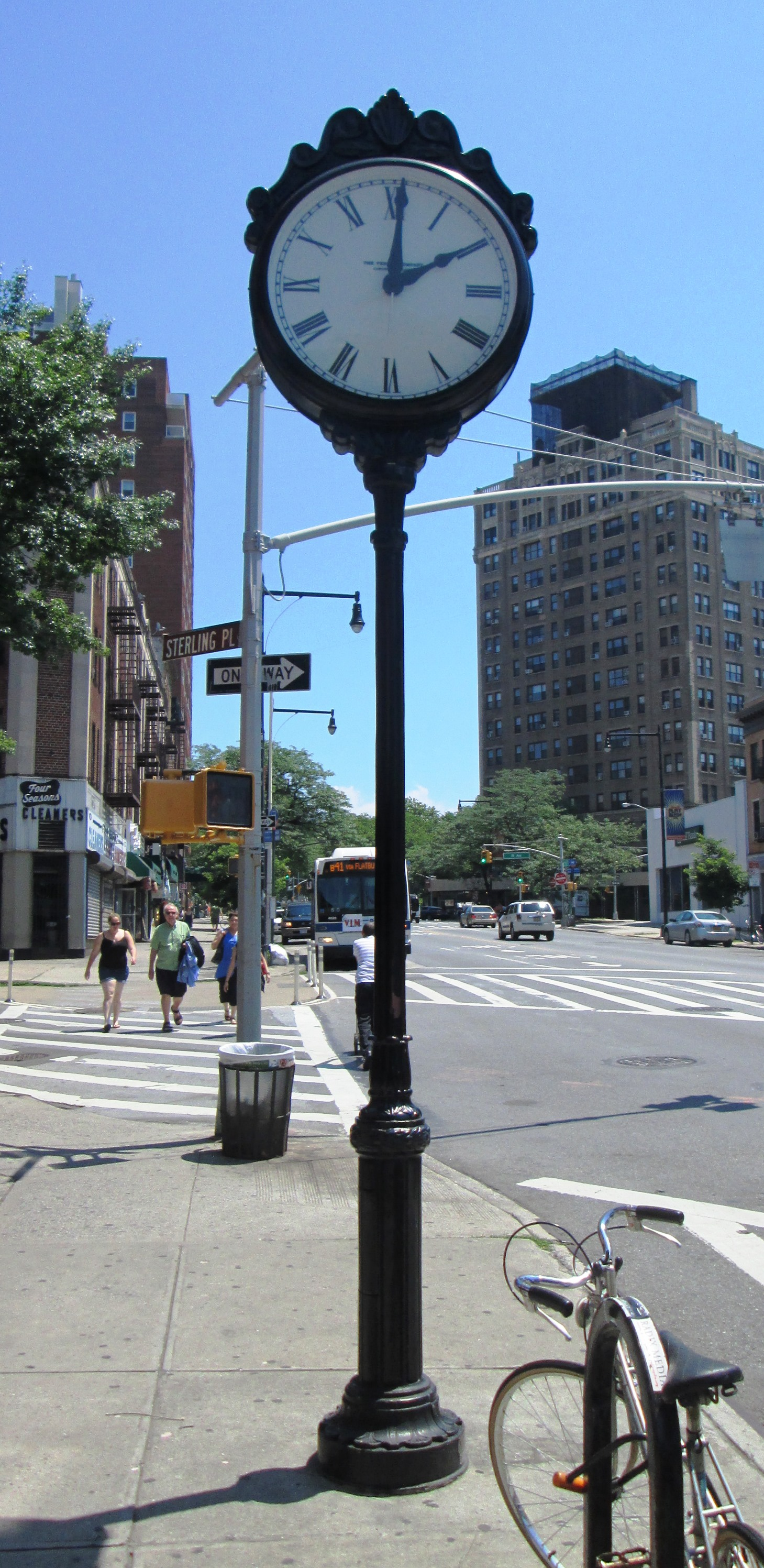
Sidewalk clock at Flatbush Avenue/Sterling Place, across from a B41 Downtown Brooklyn and B69 Kensington bus stop with a 2010 Orion VII NG HEV (4623) on the B41 arriving

Buses were substituted for streetcars on March 4, 1951.

Limited-stop service was added on September 14, 1992. In September 1996, all trips on the route were slated to be cut back to the alternate terminal at Tillary Street and Cadman Plaza West from Old Fulton Street at Fulton Landing as part of a reconfiguration of service in Downtown Brooklyn. The change took effect on March 30, 1997. This 0.6 miles (0.97 km)-long section was eliminated as it duplicated B25 service, because this section was underutilized, with an average of 1.5 passengers per trip, and because the shorter route would increase the B41's reliability. B25 service was made 24/7 to make up for the loss of Sunday service to Fulton Landing.

On December 1, 2022, the MTA released a draft redesign of the Brooklyn bus network. As part of the redesign, all Bergen Beach branch service would be replaced by the B40, which would run from Bergen Beach to Prospect Park station, making local stops along Avenue N (Veterans Avenue) and limited stops along Flatbush Avenue. The B41 Limited would be replaced with the B41 Crosstown or B41 Select Bus Service, which would continue to run from Downtown Brooklyn to Kings Plaza, making limited stops south of Kings Highway. In Downtown Brooklyn, both designations would run via Smith Street, Joralemon Street, Boerum Place, and Livingston Street. Closely spaced stops would also be eliminated.

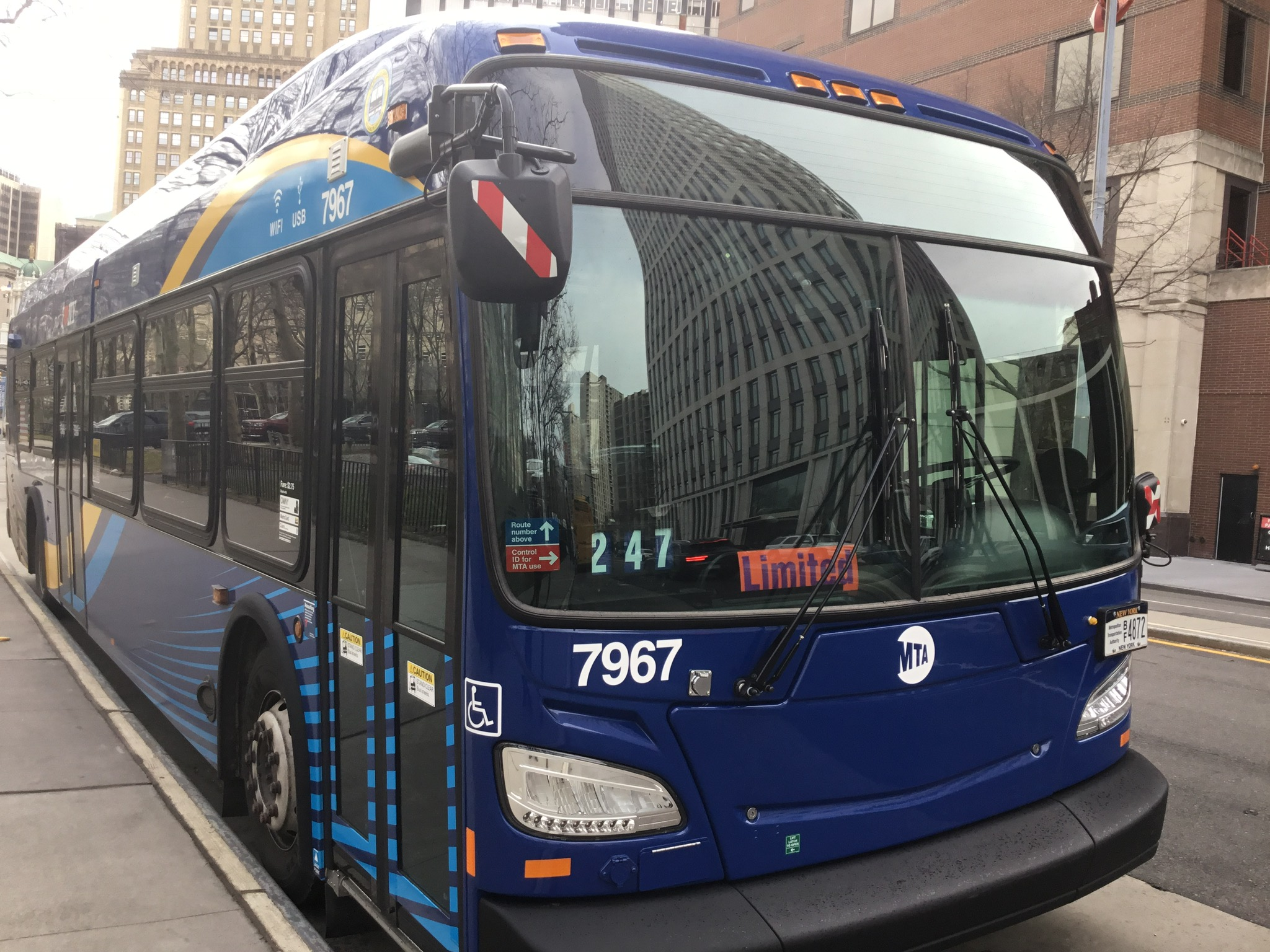
A 2022 XD40 (7967) on the B41 Limited on layover in Downtown Brooklyn

== See also ==
=== Connecting bus routes ===
- B26 (at Johnson Street)
- B25, B38, B52 (at Remsen/Montague Streets; one block east for eastbound service)
- B57, B61, B62 (at Smith Street; one block north for B57 to Maspeth)
- B45, B103 (at Atlantic Avenue)
- B63 (at Atlantic Avenue/Dean Street)
- B65 (at Dean/Bergen Streets)
- B67 (at Park Place; one block west)
- B69 (at Sterling Place/Eighth Avenue)
- B43, B48 (at Empire Boulevard)
- B16 (at Lincoln Road/Midwood Street)
- B12 (at Parkside/Clarkson Avenues)
- B35 (at Church Avenue)
- B8, B49, BM2 (at Foster Avenue)
- B6, B11 (at Glenwood Road/East 29th Street)
- B44, B44 SBS, B103 (at Nostrand Avenue/East 31st Street)
- Q35 (at Avenue H)
- BM1 (at Avenue K; local only; one block east)
- B7, B82 SBS (at Kings Highway; Q35 transfer for Bergen Beach customers)
- B9, B82 (at Flatlands Avenue; local only)
- B41 to Bergen Beach (at Avenue P/Troy Avenue)
- B100 (at Fillmore Avenue/East 48th Street; northbound is local only)
- B2, B46 (at Avenue S/Utica Avenue; one block north for B46 to Williamsburg)
- B3, B46 SBS (at Avenue U, Kings Plaza)
