= Grand Street and Newtown Railroad =

Streetcar operator in New York state

The Grand Street and Newtown Railroad was a street railway company in the U.S. state of New York. The company operated two lines - the Grand Street Line from Williamsburg to Elmhurst and the Meeker Avenue Line from Williamsburg to West Maspeth.

The company was chartered in 1859. The Brooklyn City Rail Road leased it on May 1, 1890.
