= Brooklyn, Queens County and Suburban Railroad =

The Brooklyn, Queens County and Suburban Railroad (BQC&S) was a street railway company in Brooklyn and Queens, New York, United States. It originated as a horsecar line until it was acquired by the Long Island Traction Company on November 24, 1893 and convert it into a subsidiary. The railroad was electrified in 1894.

Under the supervision of LITC, the BQC&S was placed in charge of other trolley lines which were also acquired by the LITC. These lines included the Yates Avenue and Flatbush Railroad and the extension of the Cypress Hills Line from 1883, Brooklyn, Bushwick and Queens County Railroad and Ralph Avenue Line from 1885, the North Second Street and Middle Village Railroad in 1870: along Metropolitan Avenue, the 1869 established Grand Street Ferry and Middle Village Railroad, the 1864 established Metropolitan Railroad along North 6th Street and Bushwick Avenue, the 1890-built Jamaica and Brooklyn Railroad bought in 1894, which included the Jamaica, Woodhaven and Brooklyn Railway, East New York and Jamaica Railroad, Jamaica and Brooklyn Plank Road, Long Island Electric Company (not to be confused with the Long Island Electric Railway), and the Jamaica and Woodhaven Plank Road. The railroad also built the Bergen Street Trolley Coach Depot, which today is the New York City Transit Sign Shop.

As with the rest of the LITC, it was acquired by the Brooklyn Rapid Transit Company on July 1, 1898.
