= Bushwick Avenue Line =

Public transit line in Brooklyn, New York

The Bushwick Avenue Line or Bushwick Line was a public transit line in Brooklyn, New York City, United States, running mostly along Bushwick Avenue and Myrtle Avenue between Williamsburg and Ridgewood, Queens.

== History ==
The Bushwick Railroad opened the line from the Grand Street Ferry east to their stables on Bushwick Avenue in late May or early June 1868. The line began at the company's office at the intersection of Grand Street and Kent Avenue, and proceeded south on Kent Avenue (Brooklyn City Rail Road's Greenpoint Line), east on Broadway (Broadway Railroad's Broadway Line trackage), north on Bedford Avenue, east on South Fourth Street and Meserole Street, and southeast on Bushwick Avenue. The line was soon extended southeast on Bushwick Avenue and east on Myrtle Avenue to Myrtle Avenue Park (near Cypress Avenue) in Ridgewood, Queens. A branch to the Greenpoint Ferry, through which cars were operated between this ferry and Ridgewood, was opened on September 18, 1875. This branch split at Graham Avenue, turning north along the Brooklyn City Rail Road's Graham Avenue Line. At the end of that line, it turned west on several blocks of new trackage on Driggs Avenue before reaching the Brooklyn Crosstown Railroad's Crosstown Line in Manhattan Avenue. There it turned north through Manhattan Avenue to Greenpoint Avenue, turning west there onto new trackage to reach the ferry. An extension was planned south to the Prospect Park and Coney Island Railroad depot via Graham Avenue, Tompkins Avenue, Brooklyn Avenue, Prospect Place, and Vanderbilt Avenue. This was built somewhat differently as the Tompkins Avenue Line the next year.

The Brooklyn City Rail Road extended its Myrtle Avenue Line east from its former terminus at Broadway to Bushwick Avenue and thence over the Bushwick Railroad's line to Myrtle Avenue Park in August 1879. The BCRR leased the Bushwick Railroad on July 27, 1888. On October 18, 1888, the court ruled that the BCRR had no right to operate over the Brooklyn Crosstown Railroad trackage on Manhattan Avenue, gained through an 1875 agreement between the Bushwick and Crosstown Railroads. The Crosstown owned the Greenpoint and Calvary Cemetery Railroad, which included the Calvary Cemetery Line from Greenpoint Ferry to Calvary Cemetery. The BCRR leased the Crosstown in mid-1889, but did not restore the Bushwick Avenue branch to the ferry.

Eventually, the Graham Avenue Line was extended over the trackage on Driggs Avenue, and the Greenpoint Avenue trackage to the Greenpoint Ferry became part of several lines, including the Lorimer Street Line, Union Avenue Line, and Calvary Cemetery Line.

At some point, westbound traffic to the Williamsburg Bridge was rerouted to use the Wilson Avenue Line (Johnson Avenue and Broadway) to the crossing of Johnson and Bushwick Avenues, and eastbound Wilson Avenue cars were moved to the Bushwick Avenue Line. Streetcars were discontinued on September 1, 1947.
