= B54 (New York City bus) =

Bus route in Brooklyn, New York

b54
- Myrtle Avenue Line
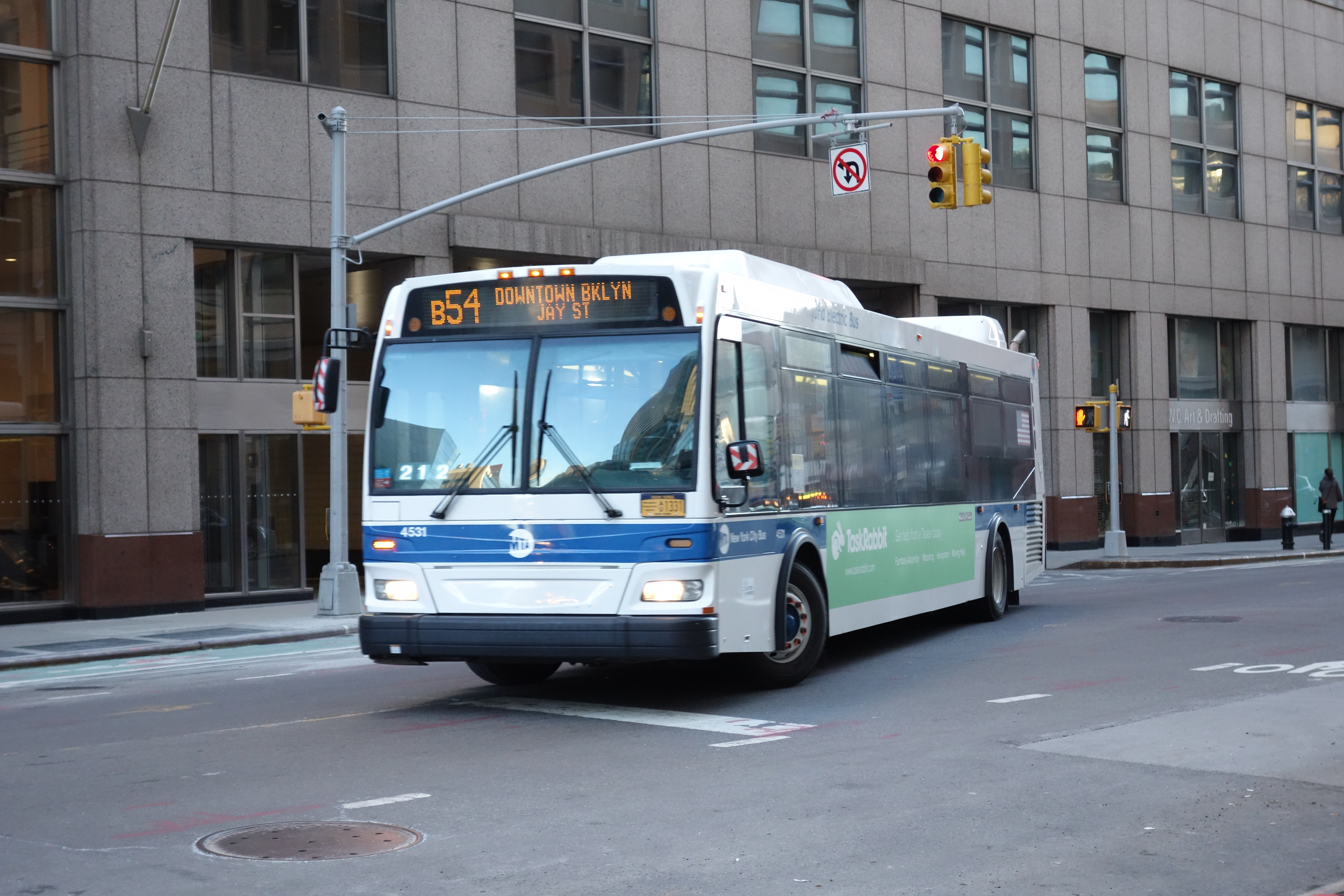
- A 2009 Orion VII NG HEV (4531) on the Downtown Brooklyn-bound B54 about to complete its Jay Street-Metro Tech trip in 2018.

Overview
- System: MTA Regional Bus Operations
- Operator: New York City Transit Authority
- Garage: Fresh Pond Depot
- Vehicle: New Flyer Xcelsior XD40

Route
- Locale: Brooklyn and Queens, New York, U.S.
- Communities served: Ridgewood, Bushwick, Bedford–Stuyvesant, Clinton Hill, Fort Greene, Downtown Brooklyn
- Start: Ridgewood Intermodal Terminal
- Via: Myrtle Avenue
- End: Downtown Brooklyn – Jay Street and Willoughby Street / Jay Street–MetroTech station
- Length: 4.5 miles (7.2 km)
- Other routes: B26 Halsey/Fulton Streets; B38 DeKalb/Lafayette Avenues; B52 Gates Avenue; Q55 (Myrtle Avenue East); Myrtle Avenue Line

Service
- Operates: 24 hours
- Annual patronage: 1,567,566 (2025)
- Transfers: Yes
- Timetable: B54

The B54 is a bus route on Myrtle Avenue in Brooklyn, New York City. The line travels between Downtown Brooklyn in the west and Myrtle–Wyckoff Avenues station in the east. The B54 operates from MTA New York City Bus's Fresh Pond Depot in Ridgewood, Queens. The route serves only the section of Myrtle Avenue within Brooklyn; the section within Queens is served by the Q55 bus.

The B54 replaced the Myrtle Avenue Line, the first streetcar line in Brooklyn, which was built by the Brooklyn City Railroad and opened in 1854. This line initially served the entirety of Myrtle Avenue with horse cars. They were replaced with electric trolleys by July 1893, and then by the two city-owned bus routes on July 17, 1949. The Myrtle Avenue Line is distinct from the BMT Myrtle Avenue Line, which is a separate subway line that also operates along a portion of Myrtle Avenue in Bushwick, Brooklyn. Until 1969, the BMT line also ran on elevated tracks above the entire Brooklyn section of Myrtle Avenue.

== Route description ==
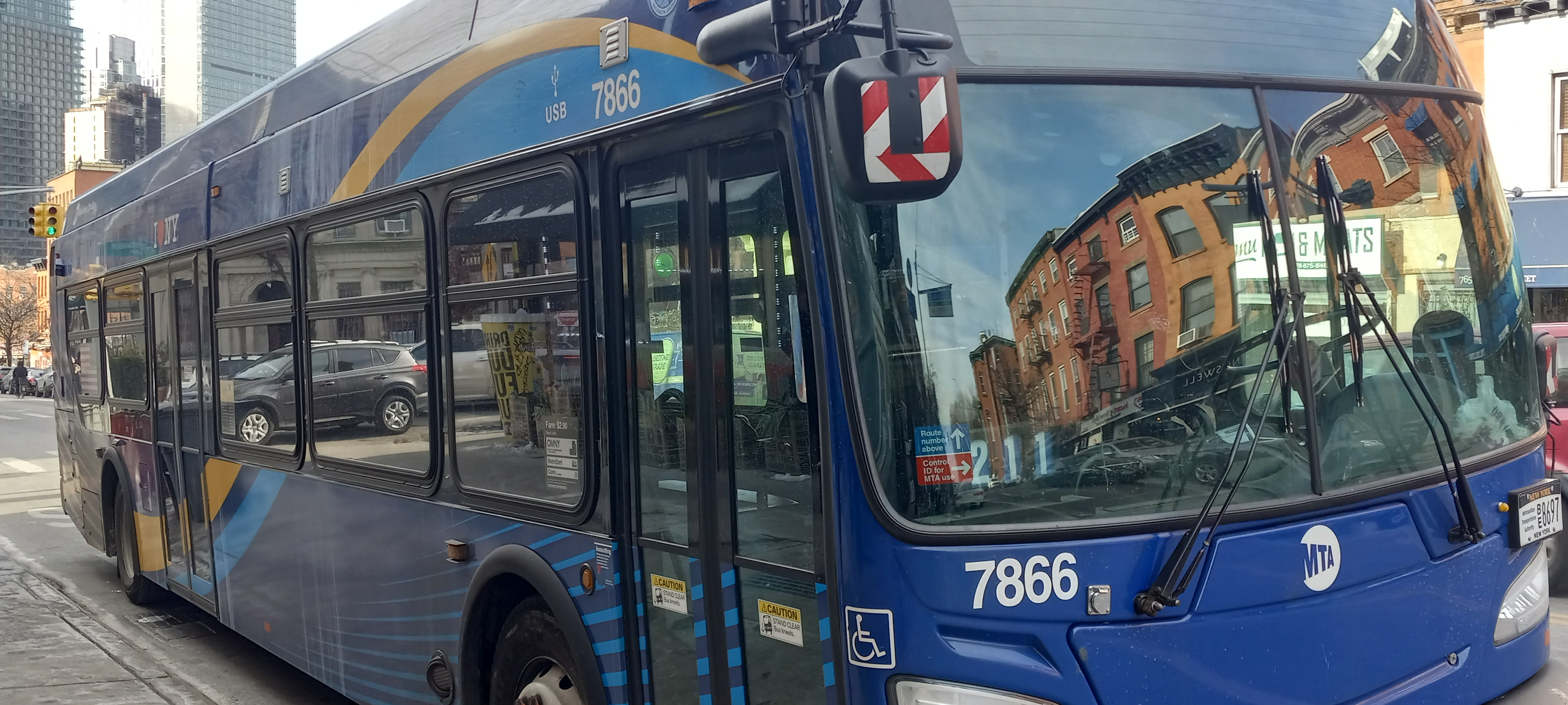
A 2022 XD40 (7866) on layover near Fort Greene, in preparation for a B54 trip to Ridgewood Term.

The B54's western terminus is at Jay Street and Willoughby Street near the Jay Street–MetroTech station in Downtown Brooklyn. From here, eastbound service heads north on Jay Street, east on Tillary Street and south on Flatbush Avenue Extension before heading east on Myrtle Avenue. Service continues along Myrtle Avenue until it turns left onto Gates Avenue. Buses then make right turns onto St. Nicholas Avenue and Palmetto Street before terminating at the Ridgewood Intermodal Terminal at Palmetto Street and Wyckoff Avenue near the Myrtle–Wyckoff Avenues station in Ridgewood.

Westbound service continues via Myrtle Avenue until Lawrence Street, where buses make a left. Buses then make a right onto MetroTech Roadway and another right onto Jay Street to get back to the terminal.

=== School trippers ===
When school is in session, one bus departs for Ridgewood from Benjamin Banneker Academy at 2:42pm. This trip makes two rights on Park and Washington Avenues, respectively, then left on Myrtle before making all stops on its normal route.

== History ==
=== Horsecar service ===
The Brooklyn City Railroad was incorporated on December 17, 1853, with a capital of $2,500,000 (equivalent to $97,000,000 in 2025). Its first line, the Myrtle Avenue Line, was the first horsecar line in Brooklyn; it opened on July 3, 1854. The initial line began at Fulton Ferry, and ran southeast on Fulton Street and east on Myrtle Avenue to a temporary terminus at Marcy Avenue. An extension to Broadway, then known as Division Avenue, at Bushwick was completed in December 1854. Myrtle Avenue itself had only been extended to Broadway from Cripplebush Road (today's Bedford Avenue) in 1852. On the second day of the horsecar's operation, a boy was injured while surfing outside one of the vehicles; author Brian Cudahy described this as a “sport” that would soon become quite popular with Brooklyn youth".

The Brooklyn City Railroad had planned to build a system of several horsecar lines across Brooklyn, but was only able to start horsecar service along Myrtle Avenue after buying the operating rights of a stage coach line that had been operated by Seymour L. Husted. The 3.43-mile-long (5.52 km) line was double-tracked and took 33 to 37 minutes for horsecars to traverse. The route was originally plied by fifteen horsecars, each pulled by four horses. The fare was originally four cents.

In August 1879, the City Railroad extended the line one block east from Broadway to Bushwick Avenue, and acquired trackage rights over the Bushwick Railroad's Bushwick Avenue Line (which used Myrtle Avenue east of Bushwick Avenue) to Myrtle Avenue Park in Ridgewood, Queens. At Ridgewood, connections could be made to two steam dummy lines to local cemeteries—the Cypress Hills Line, and later the Lutheran Line. The City Railroad acquired these cemetery lines on July 27, 1888, with the lease of the Bushwick Railroad.

=== Trolley service ===
Myrtle Avenue horse cars were replaced with electric trolleys by July 1893. The line was extended over the Brooklyn Bridge to Park Row Terminal in Lower Manhattan on February 15, 1898, along with three others, including the Graham Avenue Line. Cars reached the bridge by turning off Myrtle Avenue onto Washington Street, on trackage originally built for the DeKalb Avenue Line, and turning into Sands Street on trackage from the Graham Avenue Line. The Myrtle Avenue Line was also one of seven that were moved to the new elevated structure on the Brooklyn Bridge on September 28, 1908; the lines accessed the structure using the Sands Street elevated station, on the Brooklyn side of the bridge. Cars returned to the old route along Myrtle Avenue and Fulton Street to the split for the new structure at Tillary Street. A separate summer-only service, called the Myrtle-Culver Line, also ran along the Myrtle Avenue surface line. It connected Ridgewood with Coney Island. It ran west on Myrtle Avenue from Ridgewood to Vanderbilt Avenue, and turned south there, using the Vanderbilt Avenue Line and Culver Line trackage to Coney Island.

The Myrtle Avenue Line was combined with the Court Street Line, which had also used the Brooklyn Bridge elevated tracks, to form the Myrtle Avenue and Court Street Line on April 3, 1938. This new route began at Garnett Street and Hamilton Avenue in Gowanus, and ran north on Court Street to Borough Hall and east on Myrtle Avenue to Palmetto Street and St. Nicholas Avenue in Ridgewood. In February 1944, service was rerouted via Navy Street, Ashland Place and Willoughby Street instead of Jay Street and Adams Street. On July 27, 1944, service was rerouted in both directions via Adams Street between Willoughby Street and Myrtle Avenue. After elevated railroads stopped operating on the Brooklyn Bridge in 1944, the trolley routes began using the former elevated railroad tracks.

=== Bus service ===
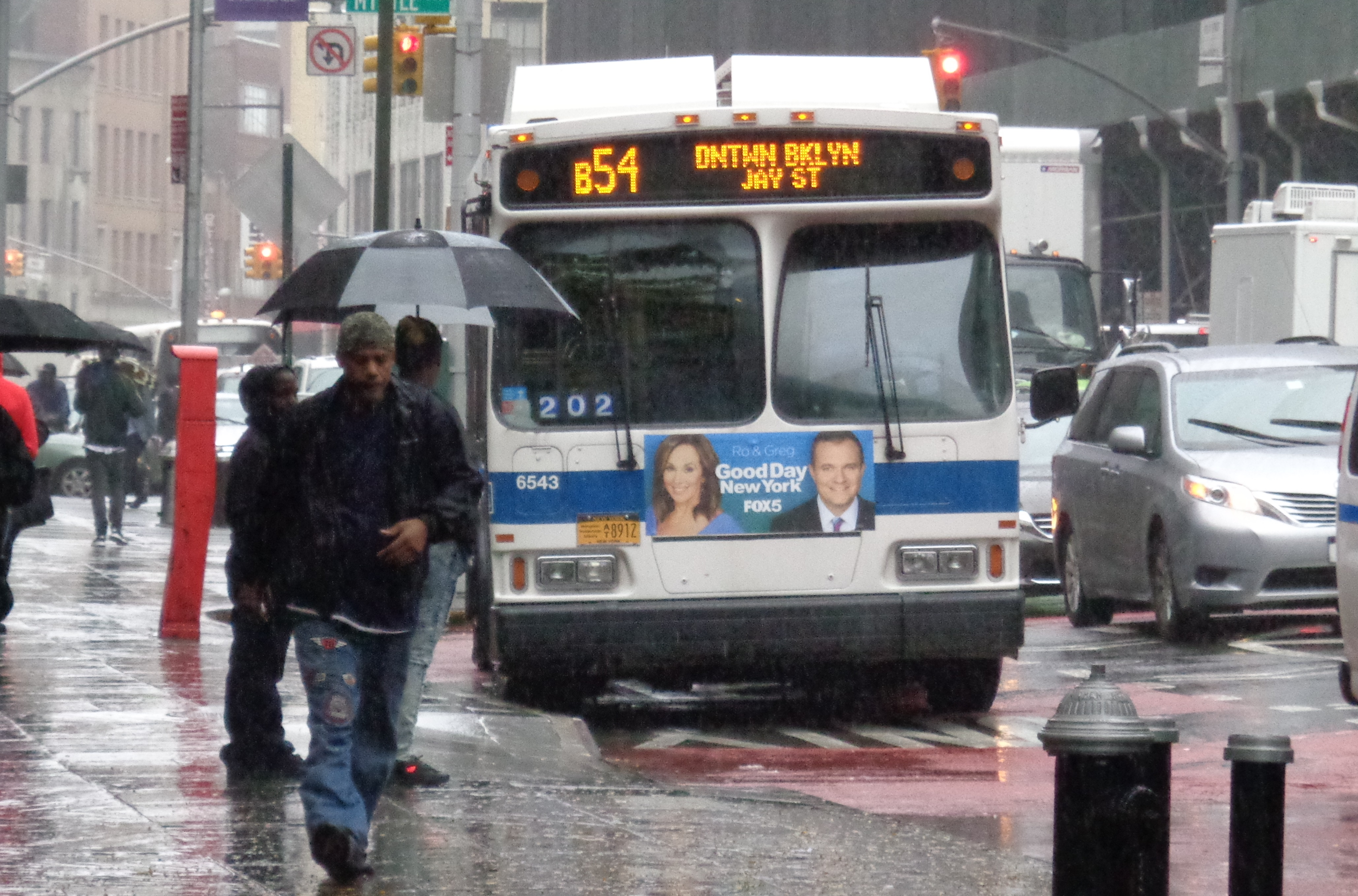
A 2005 Orion VII OG HEV (6543) on the B54 terminating at Jay Street in Downtown Brooklyn.

Beginning in the 1920s, many streetcar lines in Queens, Brooklyn, and the rest of the city began to be replaced by buses, particularly after the unification of the city's three primary transit companies (including the BMT) under municipal operations in June 1940. On June 30, 1949, the New York City Board of Estimate approved the full motorization of the Myrtle Avenue and Court Street Line with buses. The line was officially replaced by city-owned buses on July 17, 1949, and the route was split in two. Service along Myrtle Avenue was designated B54 ("B" being the designation for buses based in Brooklyn), and the line along Court Street was designated the B66. The eastern terminal of the B54 was moved to Myrtle Avenue and Palmetto Street, and it western terminal was changed to Myrtle Avenue and Washington Avenue. Service on the B54 was initially provided with ten buses, while B66 service was provided with eight buses. On September 17, 1954, the New York City Transit Authority (NYCTA) approved a plan to cut Brooklyn bus service by 10%, including the elimination of B54 service between 7 p.m. and 5 a.m. to cut costs. Free transfers would have been provided between the B53 and B57 to make up for the loss of evening and overnight B54 service. On January 20, 1955, the NYCTA approved a resolution to defer the planned service cuts until after July 1, 1955, pending additional ridership checks.

The Myrtle Avenue bus line had been located under the Myrtle Avenue Elevated for its entire length since the elevated line opened in 1889. Bus service along the corridor took 34 minutes, 11 minutes longer than the elevated trains. On October 4, 1969, the Myrtle Avenue Elevated west of the Broadway station was abandoned, the bus line became the only transportation option on Myrtle Avenue west of Broadway. Bus service was increased by 700%, with service running as frequently as every 2.5 minutes during rush hours and every 20 minutes overnight. Some of the increased service was provided by new short-turn trips that ran between Downtown Brooklyn and Broadway, with a terminal loop of Myrtle Avenue, Lewis Avenue, Stockton Street and Broadway. In addition, a special transfer was given to B54 riders between the Jay Street–Borough Hall and Myrtle Avenue–Broadway subway stations, allowing travelers who had used the Myrtle Avenue Elevated to make the connection via the bus.

Following the September 11 attacks, additional security measures were implemented at MetroTech Center, including the rerouting of B54 service out of MetroTech. On July 1, 2007, the travel path of the B54's terminal loop in Downtown Brooklyn was reversed to improve traffic flow and to provide faster service to the Jay Street subway station. Service started terminating at the newly opened Ridgewood Intermodal Terminal, located on Palmetto Street, on August 20, 2010. Palmetto Street was closed to all traffic except for New York City Transit buses and deliveries. The terminal is bordered on the south by the intersection of Myrtle and Wyckoff Avenues and on the north by St. Nicholas Avenue. The change provided easier transfers between the B54, the subway and the other five bus routes using the terminal. On November 7, 2010, direct service through MetroTech was restored as westbound service was rerouted off Flatbush Avenue Extension and Tillary Street, and onto Duffield Street and the MetroTech Roadway. The change was possible because the tenant that required the security measures was leaving MetroTech; it was expected to improve reliability and provide faster service to the subway.

On April 8, 2012, eastbound bus service was rerouted off of Fulton Mall, Fulton Street and Ashland Place. Instead, bus service continued via Jay Street, Tillary Street and Flatbush Avenue Extension before returning to Myrtle Avenue. In response to declining ridership, the MTA proposed reducing bus frequencies along the B54 route in July 2019, prompting demonstrations from opponents. The changes took effect in September 2019, in spite of riders' complaints that B38 buses were frequently overcrowded even before the service cuts.

== See also ==
=== Connecting bus routes ===
- B26, B57, B62, B67 (at Myrtle Plaza; one block north, two blocks for northbound B67 service)
- B69 (at Vanderbilt Avenue)
- B48 (at Classon/Franklin Avenues)
- B44 (at Bedford/Nostrand Avenues/Spencer Street)
- B43 (at Marcy/Tompkins/Throop Avenues)
- B15 (at Marcus Garvey Boulevard/Lewis Avenue)
- B46, B47 (at Broadway)
- B38 (at DeKalb Avenue)
- B60 (at Wilson Avenue)
- B13 (at Wyckoff Avenue)
- B26, B52, Q55, Q58, Q98 (at Saint Nicholas Avenue; one block south for B26 and Q55)

=== Other ===
- Brooklyn Bridge trolleys
- Greenpoint Line, which used the Myrtle Avenue trackage west of Classon Avenue
- Ralph and Myrtle Avenues Line, a combination of the Myrtle Avenue and Ralph Avenue Lines
