= Furman Street Line =

The Furman Street Line was a street railway line in Brooklyn, New York City, United States, running along Furman Street from Cobble Hill to Fulton Ferry.

== History ==
When the Brooklyn City Rail Road was granted franchises in 1853, one of them was through Furman Street from Atlantic Avenue north to Fulton Ferry. The City Railroad did not begin construction until late 1859; it was claimed by one side that this was only done after the Brooklyn Central and Jamaica Railroad threatened (and later received permission) to build it, and by the other side that the City Railroad had delayed until it was clear that the Central Railroad would stop using steam propulsion to South Ferry (which happened September 30, 1861). The line was opened by June 1860, and the Central Railroad also used it from their track on Atlantic Avenue, but only until September.

In October, the Board of Aldermen decided that neither company had the right to use the tracks, since the City Railroad had been given a completion deadline of December 1, 1857, and that if the two companies did not come to an agreement within five days, the Central Railroad would have the right to operate trains in Furman Street. The City Railroad continued to operate A compromise was finally agreed to in late February 1861, in which the City Railroad would allow the Central Railroad to use the Furman Street Line, and the Central Railroad would allow the City Railroad to cross it at Furman Street and Atlantic Avenue.
