= B33 (New York City bus) =

b33
- Hamilton Avenue Line

Overview
- System: MTA Regional Bus Operations
- Operator: New York City Transit Authority
- Began service: 1854—1855 (Horsecar service) ? (Streetcar service); March 29, 1942 (Bus service)
- Ended service: March 29, 1992

Route
- Locale: Brooklyn, New York, U.S.

The B33 was a public transit line in Brooklyn, New York City, running mostly along Hamilton Avenue between Bay Ridge and Hamilton Ferry at the north end of the avenue in Red Hook. Originally a streetcar line known as the Hamilton Avenue Line, it was replaced by a bus route, but is no longer operated.

== Route description ==
The westbound terminal of the route was at Van Brunt Street and Hamilton Avenue. Service continued east along Hamilton Avenue over the Gowanus Canal before merging onto 17th Street and then turning north onto 6th Avenue. After a block, service turned right onto Prospect Avenue. Service continued along Prospect Avenue until Greenwood Avenue. Buses turned east onto that street and made a right at Prospect Park Southwest, before heading east along Parkside Avenue. Service then headed north along Ocean Avenue until it reached the terminal at Empire Boulevard. Westbound service then turned south onto Flatbush Avenue and west along Lincoln Road to return to Ocean Avenue. Westbound service followed the route of eastbound service along Parkside Avenue, Prospect Park Southwest and Greenwood Avenue. Buses then turned right onto Prospect Avenue before merging into Hamilton Avenue, continuing until the terminal at Van Brunt Street.

== History ==
The route on Hamilton Avenue was not one of the original franchises granted to the Brooklyn City Rail Road in 1853, but was added soon after. The portion south of Court Street, which was one of the original routes, opened on September 4, 1854 as part of the Court Street Line to Green-Wood Cemetery, and the rest opened in early June 1855, at first operated as a shuttle between the ferry and Court Street. The line was electrified in 1892.

Eventually the route was operated along Third Avenue south to the 65th Street Depot in Bay Ridge as the 33 Hamilton line. Buses were substituted for streetcars on March 29, 1942, with 44 buses put into operation on the route. At the time, the route operate between the Hamilton Avenue Ferry terminal and 65th Street and Third Avenue, running via Hamilton Avenue, a temporary detour via the Ninth Street Bridge, and Third Avenue. The detour was in place until a new Hamilton Avenue Bridge was constructed as part of the under-construction connection between the Brooklyn Battery Tunnel and the Belt Parkway.

The route was later rerouted to run southeast from the end of Hamilton Avenue along Prospect Avenue to Prospect Park, and around the south side of the park on a route once followed by the Franklin Avenue Line and Lorimer Street Line, ending east of the park at Prospect Lefferts Gardens, near the then-Ebbets Field. Ridership dropped in 1942 with the discontinuation of the Hamilton Avenue Ferry, and in 1957 with the Brooklyn Dodgers, who played at Ebbets Field, moved to Los Angeles. In Fiscal Year 1965, weekend service was discontinued due to low ridership.

The route was discontinued on March 29, 1992 as part of a systemwide cuts in bus service due to low ridership. Discontinuing the route, which was used by about 100 daily riders, was estimated to save the New York City Transit Authority $73,000 annually. At the time of its discontinuance, its service had been reduced to rush hours only, with service only running every 40 minutes between 7 and 9 a.m., and from 3 to 5 p.m.
