= Holy Cross Shuttle =

Public transit line in Brooklyn, New York

The Holy Cross Cemetery Line or Holy Cross Shuttle was a public transit line in Brooklyn, New York City, United States, running as a short branch of the Nostrand Avenue Line along Tilden Avenue east to Holy Cross Cemetery at Canarsie Lane. Originally a streetcar line, it was replaced by a bus route, which is no longer operated. The route operated out of Flatbush Depot.

== History ==
The original line ran along Empire Boulevard and Clove Road (now mostly gone) from Nostrand Avenue southeast to the cemetery. It was the third railroad in Clove Road, after the Brooklyn and Canarsie Railroad (1866-1868) and Kings County Central Railroad (1878 only). Service began in September 1883, running from Canarsie Road (now Cortelyou Road) to Holy Cross Cemetery via Canarsie Lane, Clarkson Avenue, Clove Road, and Malbone Street (now Empire Boulevard). The New Williamsburgh and Flatbush Railroad opened the line prior to August 1, 1889, when it was leased to the Brooklyn City Rail Road. On October 4, 1892, the Town board of Flatbush denied the Brooklyn City Railroad's request to straighten the rail line and extend the route through some of the streets in the town, and the company subsequently withdrew its application.

The line was moved onto Tilden Avenue, as a branch of the new electric Nostrand Avenue Line, on July 15, 1895, and the old line was abandoned. The line was reduced to a shuttle by 1903. In December 1919, Birney cars began running along the route, making it the first route of the Brooklyn City Railroad Company to get them. On February 3, 1933, the Brooklyn and Queens Transit Corporation announced that it had sought permission to replace the trolley route with a bus route.

Buses were substituted for streetcars on April 1, 1951. The Holy Cross Shuttle had been the shortest trolley route in Brooklyn. The route was incorporated into the B44 bus route, and westbound buses ran along Beverly Road between Brooklyn Avenue and Nostrand Avenue. Bus service was discontinued on September 30, 1959. The four-block long bus route barely earned any revenue.
