= B43 (New York City bus) =

Bus route in Brooklyn, New York

b43
- Graham Avenue Line and Tompkins Avenue Line
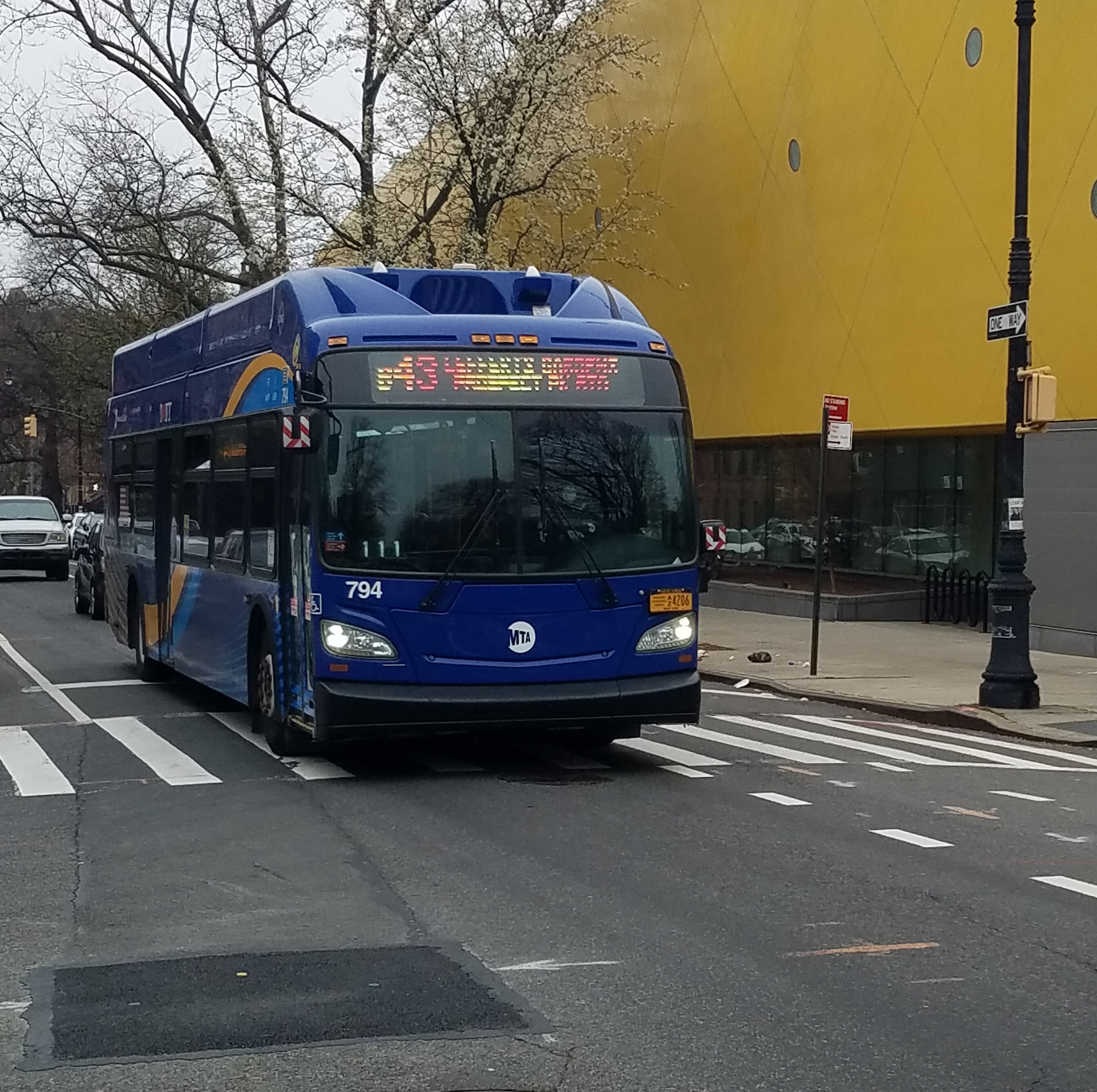
- A 2017 XN40 (794) on the Lefferts Gardens-bound B43 on Brooklyn Avenue in March 2020

Overview
- System: MTA Regional Bus Operations
- Operator: New York City Transit Authority
- Garage: Jackie Gleason Depot
- Vehicle: New Flyer C40LF CNG; New Flyer Xcelsior XN40
- Began service: July 1854 (Graham Avenue streetcar); September 10, 1995 (B43)

Route
- Locale: Brooklyn, New York, U.S.
- Communities served: Greenpoint, Williamsburg, Bedford–Stuyvesant, Crown Heights, Prospect Lefferts Gardens
- Start: Greenpoint – Box Street
- Via: Manhattan Avenue, Graham Avenue, Tompkins Avenue
- End: Prospect Lefferts Gardens – Prospect Park
- Length: 7 miles (11 km)
- Other routes: B48 Lorimer Street/Classon/Franklin Avenues

Service
- Operates: All times
- Annual patronage: 1,746,579 (2025)
- Transfers: Yes
- Timetable: B43

The Graham Avenue Line and Tompkins Avenue Line were two public transit lines in Brooklyn, New York City with the Graham Avenue Line running mainly along Graham Avenue and Manhattan Avenue and the Tompkins Avenue Line running mainly along Tompkins Avenue. The Graham Avenue line ran between Downtown Brooklyn and Greenpoint and the Tompkins Avenue Line ran between Prospect Lefferts Gardens and Williamsburg. Originally streetcar lines, they were replaced by the B47 and B62 bus routes which were then combined to form the B43 route which currently operates between Prospect Lefferts Gardens and Greenpoint. The line is dispatched from Jackie Gleason Depot in Sunset Park, Brooklyn.

== Route description ==
The B43 bus route runs between Lincoln Road near Ocean Avenue and the Prospect Park subway station in Prospect Lefferts Gardens and Manhattan Avenue and Box Street in Greenpoint via Manhattan Avenue, Graham Avenue, and Tompkins Avenue at all times.

The B43 begins at the Prospect Park station and runs on Ocean Avenue until it becomes Empire Boulevard, running on Empire Boulevard until Brooklyn and Kingston Avenues. It runs southbound on Brooklyn Avenue and northbound on Kingston Avenue until Fulton Street, where it switches to Tompkins and Throop Avenues, respectively. It runs on Tompkins and Throop Avenues until Flushing Avenue. It runs on Flushing Avenue until Graham Avenue, which it runs on until Engert and Driggs Avenues until Manhattan Avenue. It then runs up Manhattan Avenue until Box Street, where it terminates.

== History ==
=== Trolley service ===
The Brooklyn City Railroad opened the line, as the Flushing Avenue Line, in July 1854 as a branch of the Fulton Street Line continuing east along Flushing Avenue to Throop Avenue with an extension to Division Avenue (present-day Broadway) in April 1855. It was later extended north along Graham Avenue to North Second Street (present-day Metropolitan Avenue) in 1867 and to Van Cott Avenue (present-day Driggs Avenue) in October 1872.

On April 27, 1890, Brooklyn City opened new trackage on Flushing Avenue from Graham Avenue east to Metropolitan Avenue, with the service operating on it becoming the new Flushing Avenue Line, and the old Flushing Avenue Line being renamed the Flushing and Graham Avenues Line and afterwards, the Graham Avenue Line.

=== Bus service ===
Streetcars on the Tompkins Avenue Line were replaced by buses on August 24, 1947.

Buses on the Graham Avenue Line were substituted for streetcars on December 11, 1949, and the route was renumbered the B62.

The B47 trolley was replaced with electric trolley buses and ran on Kingston Avenue in both directions (it was a two-way street) to Williamsburg Bridge Plaza via Tompkins, Division, and Lee Avenues. During the heavy snowfalls in the 1950s, the electric buses had difficulty making it up the Kingston Avenue hill, and were seen backed up on Empire Boulevard in columns.

When the north-south avenues in Brooklyn were converted to one way in the early 1960s, the B47 went north on Kingston Avenue and south on Brooklyn Avenue until Empire Boulevard. The electric trolleybuses were replaced first with “old look” GMC buses, and later with “new-look” GMC buses.

On September 10, 1995, the B62 was merged with the B47 to form the present-day B43 route. The B47 had replaced the Tompkins Avenue Line running between Prospect Lefferts Gardens and Williamsburg along Empire Boulevard, Kingston Avenue, Tompkins Avenue, and Harrison Avenue. When the routes were combined, the Harrison Avenue portion of the B47 was removed, along with the Flushing Avenue section of the B62. The B43 was moved to the Grand Avenue Depot when it opened in 2008, but was moved back to the Jackie Gleason Depot by early 2011.

On December 1, 2022, the MTA released a draft redesign of the Brooklyn bus network. As part of the redesign, southbound service in Bedford–Stuyvesant would be rerouted along Albany Avenue and Marcus Garvey Boulevard to serve areas without existing bus service. Closely spaced stops would also be eliminated.

== Incidents ==
On the morning of October 26, 2021, a bus operator was doing the B43 to Greenpoint when a van ran a stop sign at Eastern Parkway and collided with the front of the bus, sending it into a Bank of America center. No passengers were on the bus when it crashed, but the operator and a few in the van were injured.

== See also ==
- Greenpoint and Williamsburgh Railroad
- Crosstown Line (Brooklyn surface)

=== Connecting bus routes ===
- B16, B48 (on Lincoln Road)
- B41 (at Flatbush Avenue)
- B49 (at Bedford/Rogers Avenues)
- B44 SBS (at Rogers/Nostrand Avenues)
- B44 (at Nostrand/New York Avenues)
- B45 (at St. John’s Place)
- B65 (at Bergen/Dean Streets)
- B25 (at Fulton Street)
- B26 (at Halsey Street)
- B52 (at Gates Avenue)
- B38 (at Lafayette/DeKalb Avenues)
- B54 (at Myrtle Avenue)
- B57 (at Flushing Avenue)
- B46 (at Broadway)
- B60 (at Johnson/Montrose Avenues)
- Q54, Q59 (at Grand Street)
- B24 (at Metropolitan Avenue)
- B48, B62 (at Driggs/Nassau Avenues)
- B32, B62 (at Green/Freeman Streets)
