= Union Avenue Line (Brooklyn) =

The Union Avenue Line was a public transit line in Brooklyn, New York City, United States, running mostly along Myrtle Avenue, Knickerbocker Avenue, Flushing Avenue, Throop Avenue, and Union Avenue from Ridgewood, Queens northwest to Greenpoint, Brooklyn.

== History ==
The Calvary Cemetery, Greenpoint and Brooklyn Railroad began operating the Calvary Cemetery Line on Greenpoint Avenue, from Greenpoint Ferry in Brooklyn east across the Blissville Bridge over Newtown Creek to Calvary Cemetery in Queens, in the mid-1880s. This route ran along part of the Bushwick Railroad's Bushwick Avenue Line west of Manhattan Avenue. On April 21, 1887, the Brooklyn Crosstown Railroad, which operated on Manhattan Avenue, bought the company, which was not profitable. The Crosstown soon began building the rest of the CCG&B's proposed system, from the Crosstown's stables on Manhattan Avenue in Greenpoint east on Ash Street, south on McGuinness Boulevard, west on Driggs Avenue, and south on Union Avenue, Broadway, and Throop Avenue to a terminus at Park Avenue. This included some trackage of the Bushwick Railroad's Bushwick Avenue Line and the Crosstown's Crosstown Line on Driggs Avenue. Plans were also made to continue the line south past Park Avenue to Prospect Park, but were not carried through.

The Park Avenue Line, a cable car line, ran from Fulton Ferry east to Bushwick, including a stretch of Crosstown trackage on Park Avenue between Navy Street and Washington Avenue. It had been built by the Atlantic Avenue Railroad and leased to a cable company. The line was a failure, and the lessee transferred the lease to the Crosstown in July 1887, giving the Crosstown access to downtown and an outlet for the Union Avenue Line. Horse cars replaced Park Avenue cable cars on July 16, and Union Avenue cars began running to the Brooklyn Bridge around then. The Brooklyn City Rail Road leased the Crosstown on August 1, 1889, and on August 2 it truncated the Union Avenue route to Park Avenue; about a month later the original owner - the Atlantic Avenue Railroad - began operating the Park Avenue Line with horse cars.

On April 27, 1890, the Brooklyn City opened new trackage on Flushing Avenue from Graham Avenue east to Metropolitan Avenue, and on Knickerbocker Avenue from Flushing Avenue southeast to Myrtle Avenue. In addition to introducing a new Flushing Avenue Line (the existing line on Flushing Avenue was the Graham Avenue Line), it rerouted the Union Avenue Line to run from Ridgewood to Greenpoint Ferry. This new route used Myrtle Avenue, Knickerbocker Avenue, Flushing Avenue, Throop Avenue, Union Avenue, Driggs Avenue, Manhattan Avenue, and Greenpoint Avenue.

Streetcar service stopped running on December 1, 1945 on a temporary basis, but service was never restored.
