= B29 (New York City bus) =

Former bus route in Brooklyn, New York

The Meeker and Marcy Avenues Line was a public transit line in Brooklyn, New York City, running along Marcy Avenue, Metropolitan Avenue, Graham Avenue, and Meeker Avenue from Fulton Street in Bedford-Stuyvesant to Penny Bridge in Williamsburg. The line was owned by the Grand Street and Newtown Railroad.

The line was replaced by the B29 bus on April 17, 1939, and was absorbed into the B24 bus route (formerly the Calvary Cemetery Line) on June 30, 1949.
