= B52 (New York City bus) =

Bus route in Brooklyn, New York

b52
- Gates Avenues Line
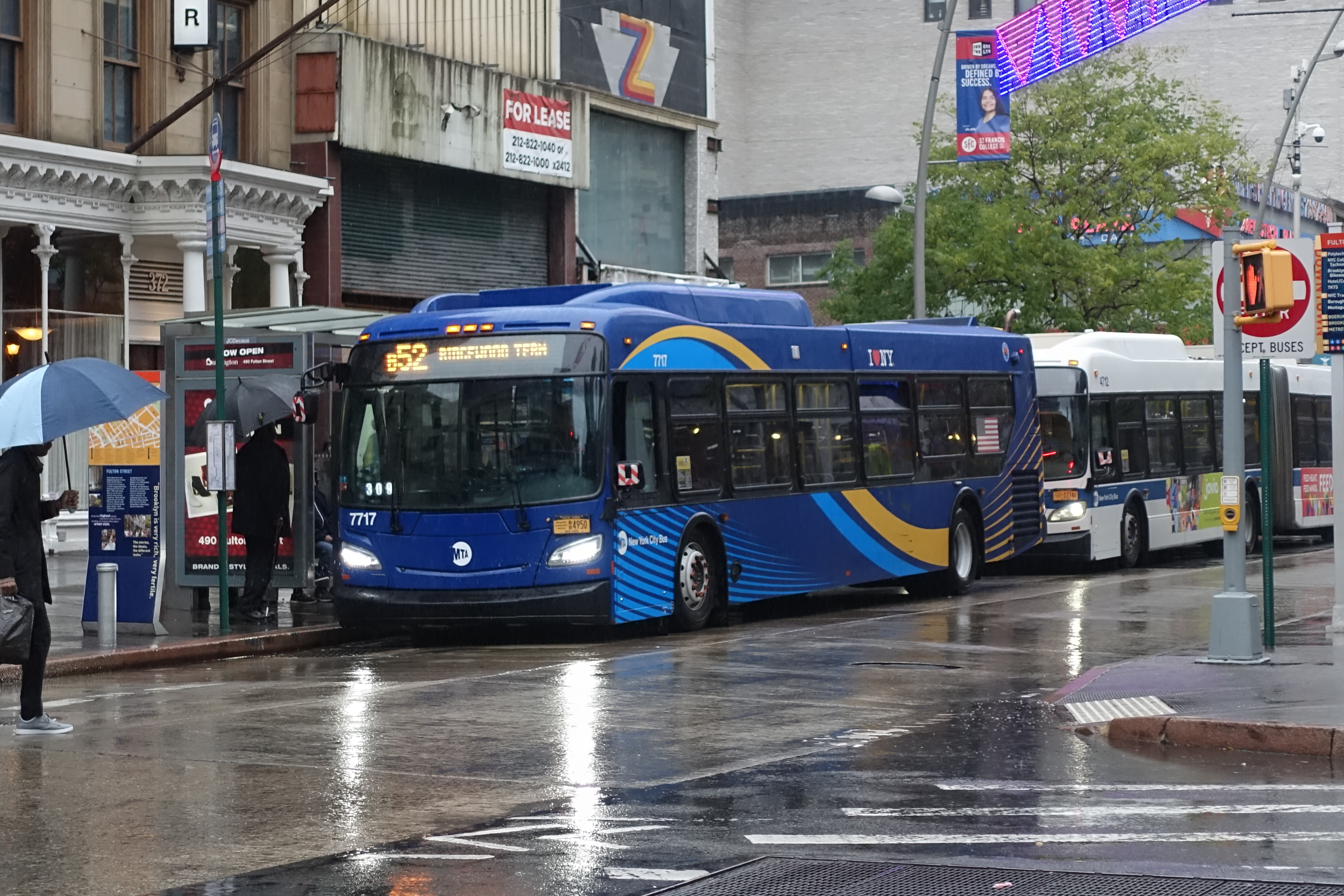
- A 2018 XD40 (7717) on the Ridgewood-bound B52 at Downtown Brooklyn-Fulton Mall on Smith Street in November 2022.

Overview
- System: MTA Regional Bus Operations
- Operator: New York City Transit Authority
- Garage: Fresh Pond Depot
- Vehicle: New Flyer Xcelsior XD40
- Began service: 1874 (streetcar)
- Predecessors: Greene and Gates Avenues Line streetcar

Route
- Locale: Brooklyn and Queens, New York, U.S.
- Communities served: Ridgewood, Bushwick, Bedford–Stuyvesant, Clinton Hill, Fort Greene, Downtown Brooklyn
- Start: Downtown Brooklyn – Cadman Plaza and Tillary Street
- Via: Fulton Street, Greene Avenue, Gates Avenue
- End: Ridgewood Terminal – Wyckoff Avenue & Palmetto Street
- Length: 5.7 miles (9.2 km)
- Other routes: B26 Halsey/Fulton Streets; B38 DeKalb/Lafayette Avenues; B54 Myrtle Avenue

Service
- Operates: All times
- Annual patronage: 2,051,834 (2025)
- Transfers: Yes
- Timetable: B52

The B52 is a bus route that constitutes a public transit line operating in Brooklyn, New York City, running mostly along Fulton Street, Greene Avenue, and Gates Avenue between Downtown Brooklyn and Ridgewood, Queens. The B52 is operated by the MTA New York City Transit Authority. Its precursor was a streetcar line that began operation by 1874, and was known as the Greene and Gates Avenues Line. The route became a bus line in 1941.

== Route description ==
The B52's western terminus is at Cadman Plaza West south of Tillary Street near the Jay Street–MetroTech station in Downtown Brooklyn. From here, eastbound service heads north on Cadman Plaza West, east on Tillary Street and south on Adams Street before heading east on Fulton Street. Service continues along Fulton Street until it turns left onto Greene Avenue. Buses then turn right onto Franklin Avenue, before turning left onto Gates Avenue. Buses continue on Gates Avenue until they make a right at Irving Avenue, after which they turn left onto Palmetto Street before terminating at the Ridgewood Intermodal Terminal at Palmetto Street and Wyckoff Avenue near the Myrtle–Wyckoff Avenues station in Ridgewood.

Westbound service continues north on Palmetto Street and then makes a left onto St. Nicholas Avenue. Service then turns left onto Gates Avenue, and continues via this street until it makes a right onto Classon Avenue. Buses then make a left onto Greene Avenue, and a right onto Fulton Street, which then becomes Joralemon Street. Service then turns right at Court Street, which turns into Cadman Plaza West, and reach the terminal.

== History ==
The Brooklyn City Railroad opened a branch of their Fulton Street Line along Greene Avenue, Franklin Avenue, and Gates Avenue to Broadway by 1874. By 1897, the line was extended northeast along Gates Avenue past Broadway to Myrtle Avenue, and east along Myrtle Avenue on trackage built for the Bushwick Avenue Line to Ridgewood, Queens. Buses were substituted for streetcars on October 5, 1941.

The B52 was rerouted to run two-way on Gates Avenue between Spring 1991 and October 1993 to accommodate the reconstruction of Greene Avenue and Quincy Street, which was subsequently deferred. The B52 returned to running eastbound on Quincy Street and Linden Street and running westbound on Gates Avenue. The local community then requested reinstating two-way service via Gates Avenue because the street was wider, there was less congestion, and because there were greater housing development densities on that street. Brooklyn Community Boards 2, 3 and 4 supported the change, and a public hearing was held on June 16, 1994. The change went into effect in January 1995.
