= Greenpoint Line =

Streetcar line in Brooklyn, New York City, United States

The Greenpoint Line was a streetcar line in Brooklyn, New York City, United States. When it stopped operating in 1942, it was not replaced by a bus route.

== History ==
The line was opened by the Brooklyn City Railroad in October 1854 to Bushwick Creek. The line ceased operations on August 17, 1942. Parallel service was provided by the Crosstown Line, now the B62 bus route.
