= B26 (New York City bus) =

Bus route in Brooklyn, New York

b26
- Halsey/Fulton Streets Line
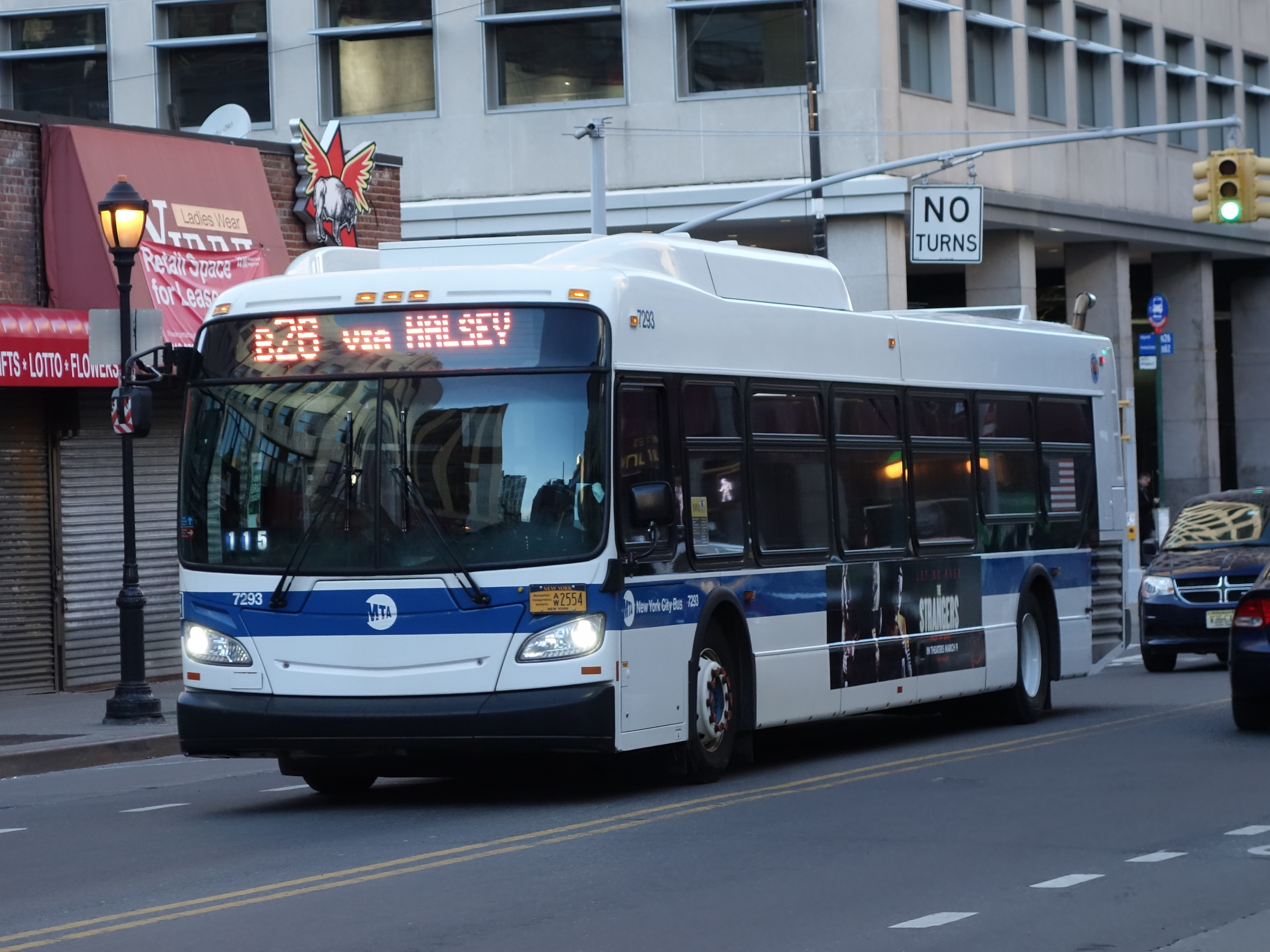
- A 2015 XD40 (7293) on the Ridgewood-bound B26 traveling along Jay Street in Downtown Brooklyn

Overview
- System: MTA Regional Bus Operations
- Operator: New York City Transit Authority
- Garage: Fresh Pond Depot
- Vehicle: New Flyer Xcelsior XD40

Route
- Locale: Brooklyn and Queens, New York, U.S.
- Communities served: Ridgewood, Bushwick, Bedford–Stuyvesant, Clinton Hill, Fort Greene, Downtown Brooklyn
- Start: Downtown Brooklyn – Cadman Plaza West and Tillary Street
- Via: Fulton Street, Halsey Street
- End: Ridgewood, Queens – Wyckoff Avenue and Palmetto Street
- Length: 6.3 miles (10.1 km)
- Other routes: B25 Fulton Street; B38 DeKalb/Lafayette Avenues; B52 Gates Avenue; B54 Myrtle Avenue

Service
- Operates: All times
- Annual patronage: 1,865,073 (2025)
- Transfers: Yes
- Timetable: B26

The Putnam Avenue Line is a public transit line in Brooklyn, New York City, running mostly along Fulton Street, Putnam Avenue, and Halsey Street between downtown Brooklyn and Ridgewood, Queens. Originally a streetcar line, it is now the B26 Halsey/Fulton Streets bus route, operated by the New York City Transit Authority.

== Route description ==
The B26 bus route begins at the Jay Street–MetroTech subway station in Downtown Brooklyn, connecting with the New York City Subway's A, C, F, <F>, and R trains. It heads east on Fulton Street, turning off onto Putnam Avenue, and uses Nostrand Avenue (eastbound) and Bedford Avenue (westbound) to reach Halsey Street. Just before the Queens border, the route turns northwest on Wyckoff Avenue, ending with a loop at the Myrtle–Wyckoff Avenues subway station (L and M trains) clockwise via Putnam Avenue, Ridgewood Place, Palmetto Street, and back on to Wyckoff Avenue. Along the way, passengers can transfer to the subway at DeKalb Avenue (B, Q, and R trains), Clinton–Washington Avenues (C train), and Halsey Street (J train).

== History ==
The Brooklyn City Rail Road opened a branch of their Fulton Street Line along Putnam Avenue, Nostrand Avenue, and Halsey Street to Broadway by 1874. By 1897, cars could also use a short spur along Howard Avenue from Halsey Street north to Broadway. The line was extended northeast past Broadway on Halsey Street to the Queens County line and northwest on Wyckoff Avenue to Ridgewood after 1897.

Putnam Avenue horse cars were replaced with electric trolleys on July 17, 1893.

Buses were substituted for streetcars on September 21, 1941, but the line was converted back to streetcars between November 29, 1942 and February 5, 1950, when the route became the B26 bus route.

In January 1995, the B26 was extended from Adams Street and Johnson Street to a new terminal at Cadman Plaza West and Tilllary Street to eliminate operational problems. To access the terminal at Adams, the B26 used a cut through the median separating the main and service roads of Adams Street, which was dangerous for buses to traverse. In addition, the terminal was congested with illegal parking, the park at the terminal was considered unsafe at night, there was no bus dispatcher at the terminal, and as passengers traveling to the Court Street/Montague Street area had to cross eight-lane Adams Street. At the new terminal, illegal parking was less of a problem, the area was safer, and because the B26 would share a terminal with the B38 and B52, the bus dispatcher assigned to those routes could also do so for the B26.

On December 1, 2022, the MTA released a draft redesign for the Brooklyn bus network. As part of the redesign, B26 service on Putnam Avenue would be discontinued, and the B26 would become a "Rush" route, being rerouted to make limited stops along Fulton Street west of Bedford/Nostrand Avenues. The B26 would also replace overnight service on the B25 west of Franklin Avenue, making all local stops. Closely spaced stops would be eliminated.
