= B25 (New York City bus) =

Bus route in Brooklyn, New York

b25
- Fulton Street Line
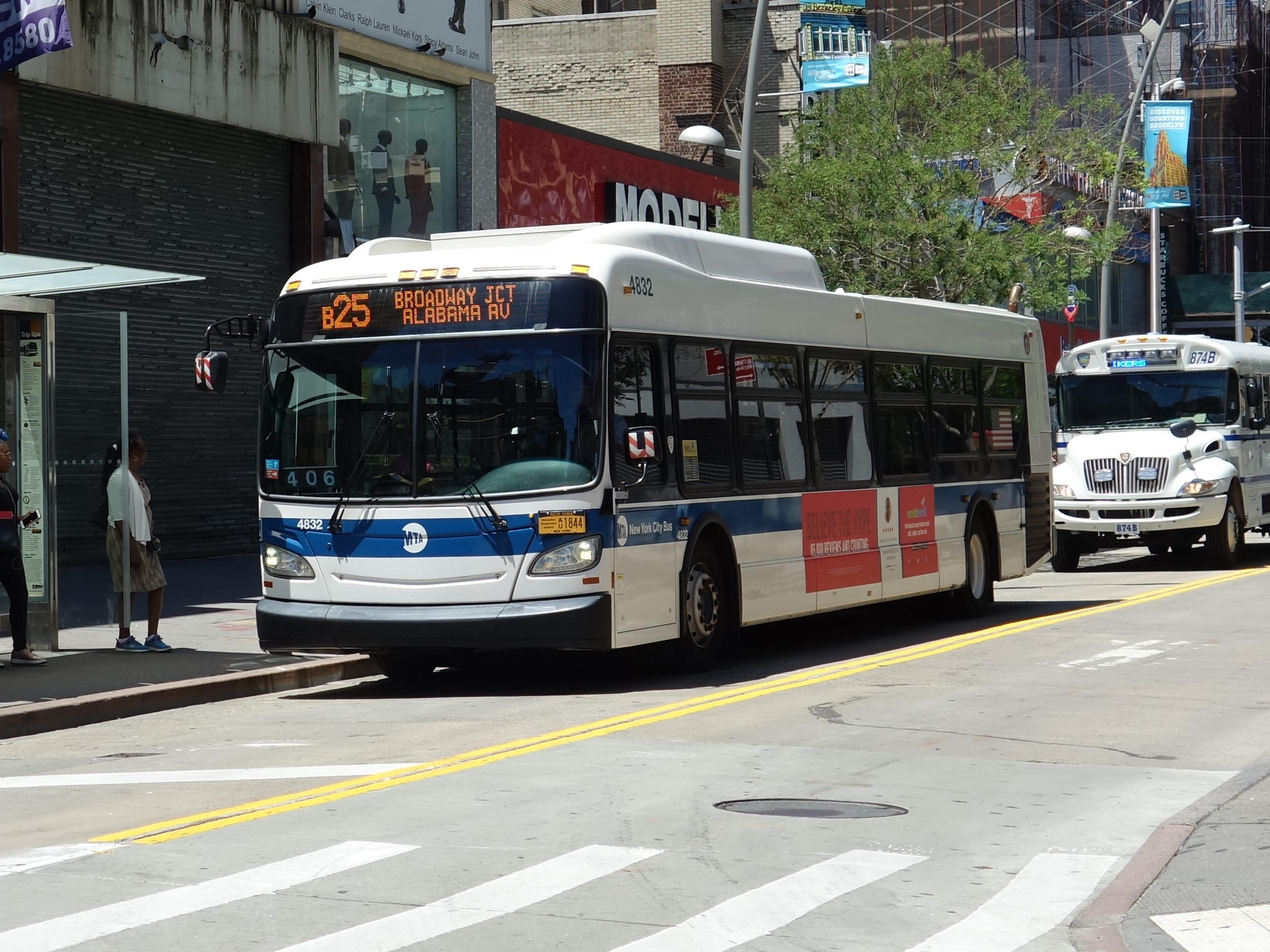
- A 2011 XD40 (4832) on the Broadway Junction-bound B25 on Smith Street near Fulton Mall in July 2018.

Overview
- System: MTA Regional Bus Operations
- Operator: New York City Transit Authority
- Garage: East New York Depot
- Vehicle: New Flyer Xcelsior XD40; New Flyer Xcelsior XDE40; New Flyer Xcelsior XE40; OBI Orion VII NG HEV

Route
- Locale: Brooklyn, New York, U.S.
- Communities served: East New York, Ocean Hill, Bedford–Stuyvesant, Clinton Hill, Fort Greene, Downtown Brooklyn, Brooklyn Heights, DUMBO
- Start: East New York – Broadway Junction and Alabama Avenue
- Via: Fulton Street
- End: Fulton Landing – Front Street and Dock Street
- Length: 6.1 miles (9.8 km)
- Other routes: B26 Halsey/Fulton Streets; Fulton Street Line

Service
- Operates: All times
- Annual patronage: 1,324,295 (2025)
- Transfers: Yes
- Timetable: B25

The B25 bus route constitutes a public transit line in Brooklyn, New York City, running mainly along Fulton Street between Fulton Ferry and East New York. It was originally the Fulton Street Line or East New York Line streetcar line run by the Brooklyn–Manhattan Transit Corporation (BMT). In 1941, the streetcar line was replaced by bus service, and it is now operated by the New York City Transit Authority.

== Route description ==
The B25 bus route runs along Old Fulton Street and Fulton Street between Fulton Ferry and the Broadway Junction subway station (A, C, J, L, and Z) in East New York, except in Downtown Brooklyn, where a block of the street past Borough Hall is closed. Along the way, subway transfers can be made at Court Street–Borough Hall (2, 3, 4, 5, N, R, and W), Jay Street–MetroTech (A, C, F, <F>, N, R, and W), DeKalb Avenue (B, D, N, Q, R, and W), and at various points along the IND Fulton Street Line. The route is based out of East New York Bus Depot.

== History ==
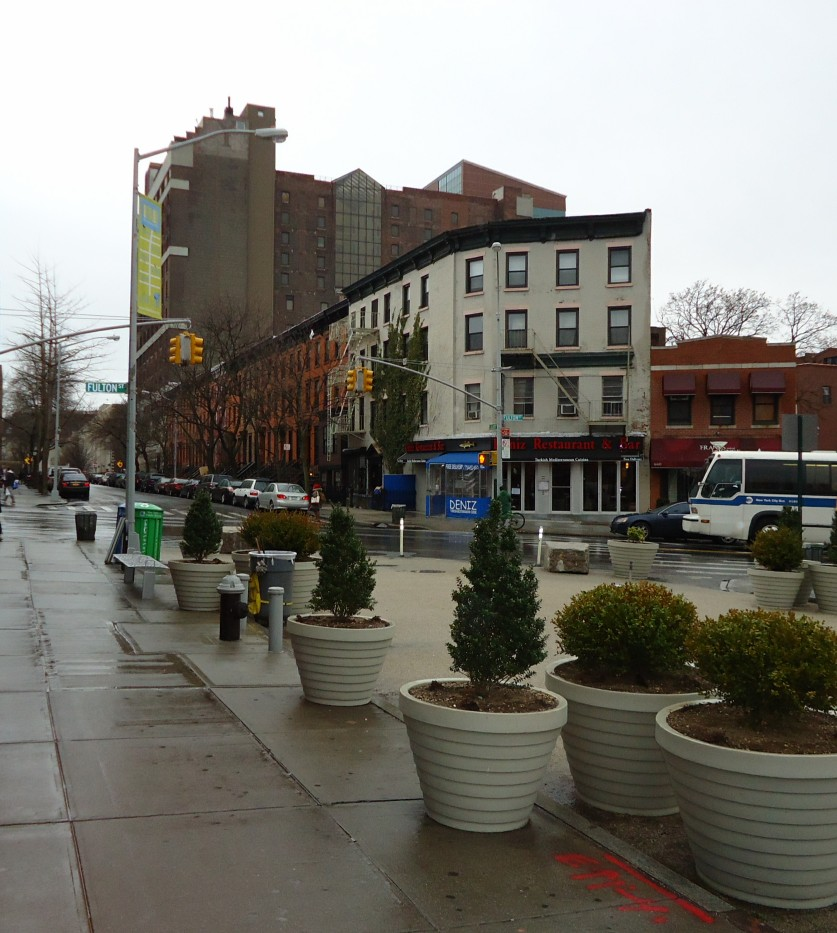
An RTS bus on the B25 on Fulton Street near a streetscape

The Brooklyn City Rail Road opened a line along Fulton Street from Fulton Ferry on July 6, 1854; it reached East New York by 1874. Buses were substituted for streetcars on August 10, 1941.

In 1998, the line was extended further into DUMBO to Water Street and Main Street during the daytime hours on weekdays. This was at the request of a real estate developer who had paid an annual fee of $90,000 to the Transit Authority to operate the service. The fee has not been paid since 2000, but the part-time extension remained in effect. Service to Main Street began operating at all times in 2011.

On December 1, 2022, the Metropolitan Transportation Authority released a draft redesign of the Brooklyn bus network. As part of the redesign, the B25 would maintain its existing routing, along with the elimination of closely spaced stops, but would end at Franklin Avenue overnight, with the B26 taking over local service on Fulton Street west of this point.

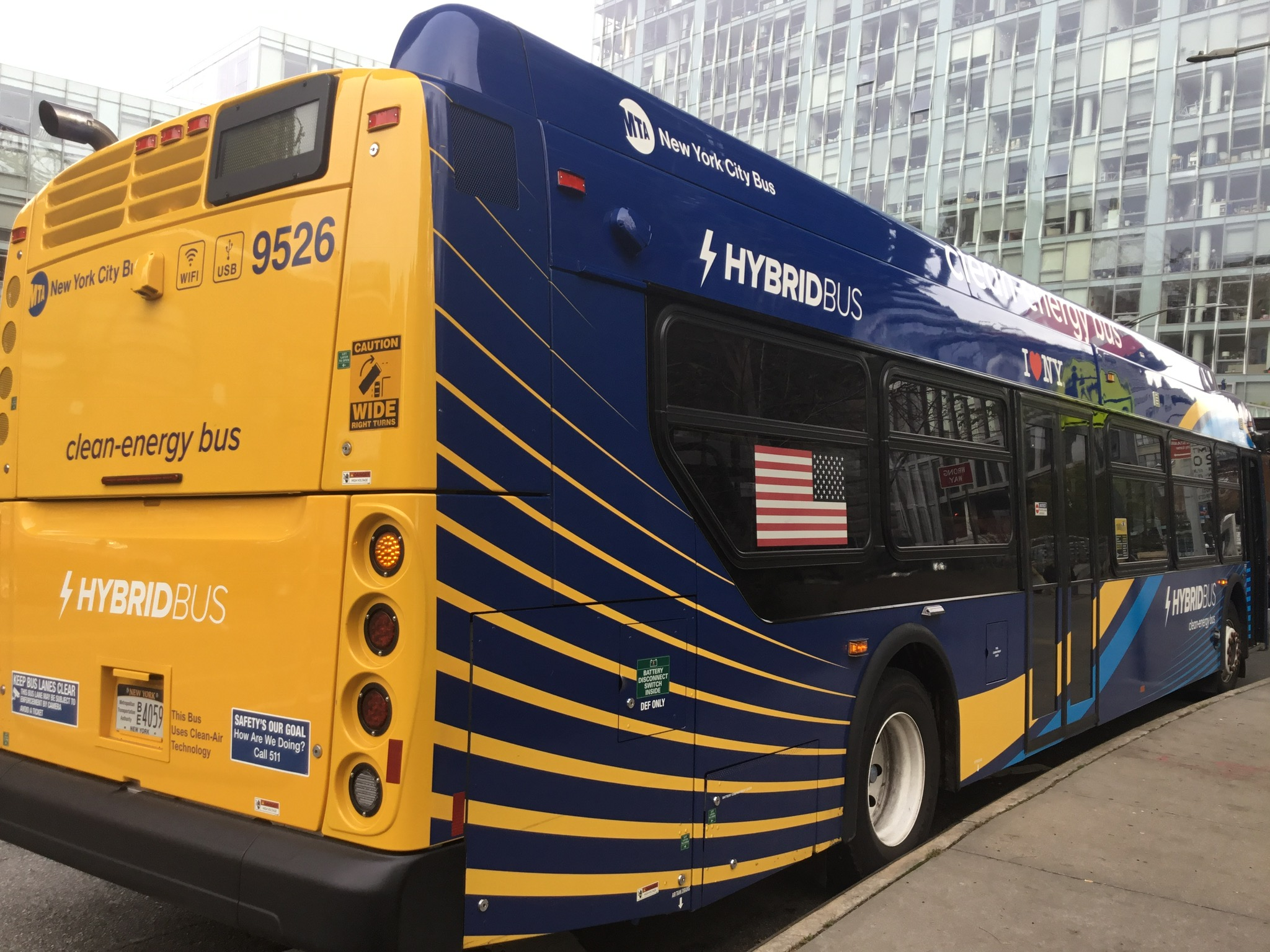
A 2021 XDE40 (9526) on the B25 on layover in Dumbo, Brooklyn
