= DeKalb Avenue =

Avenue in Brooklyn, New York

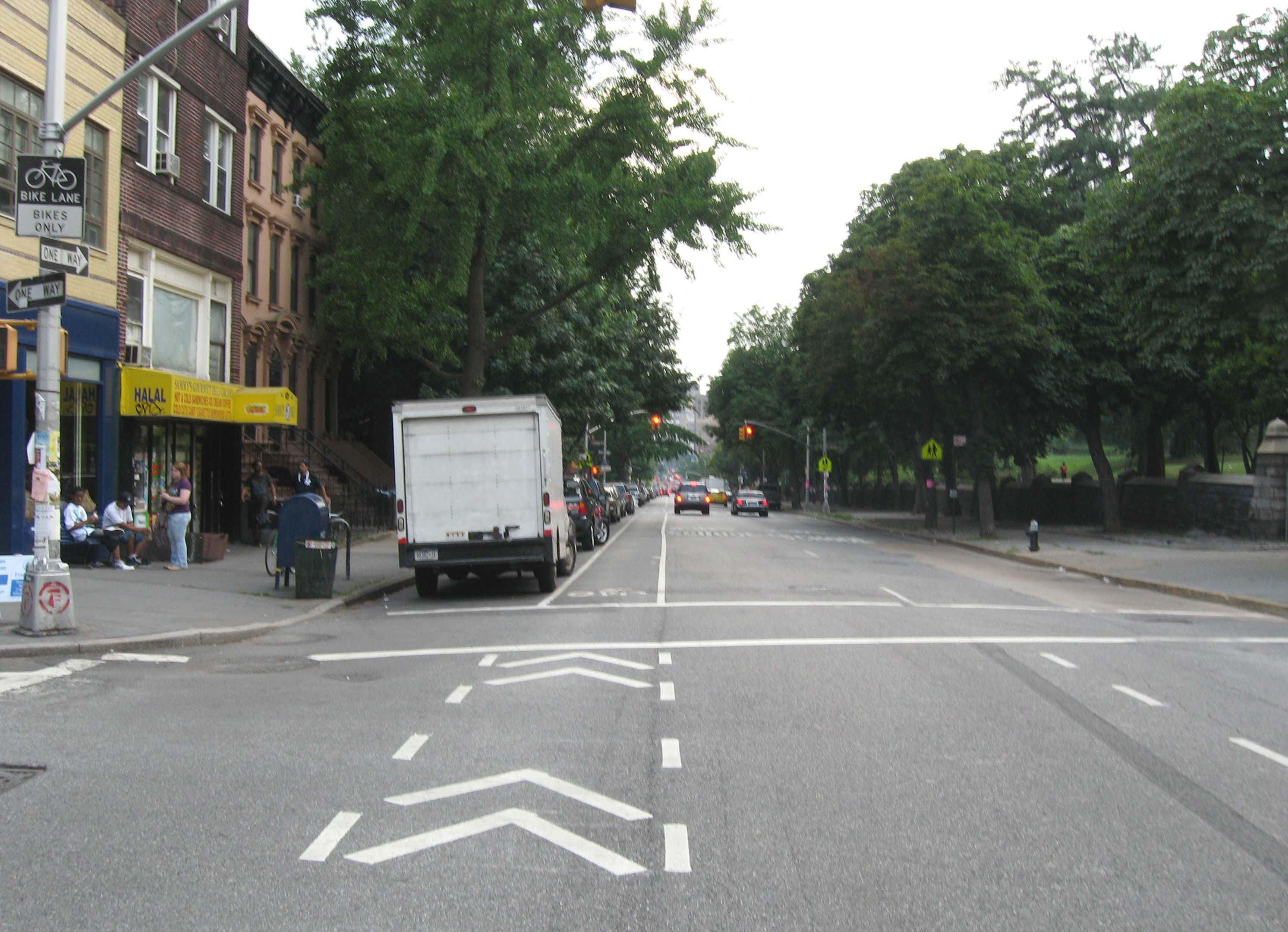
At Fort Greene Park

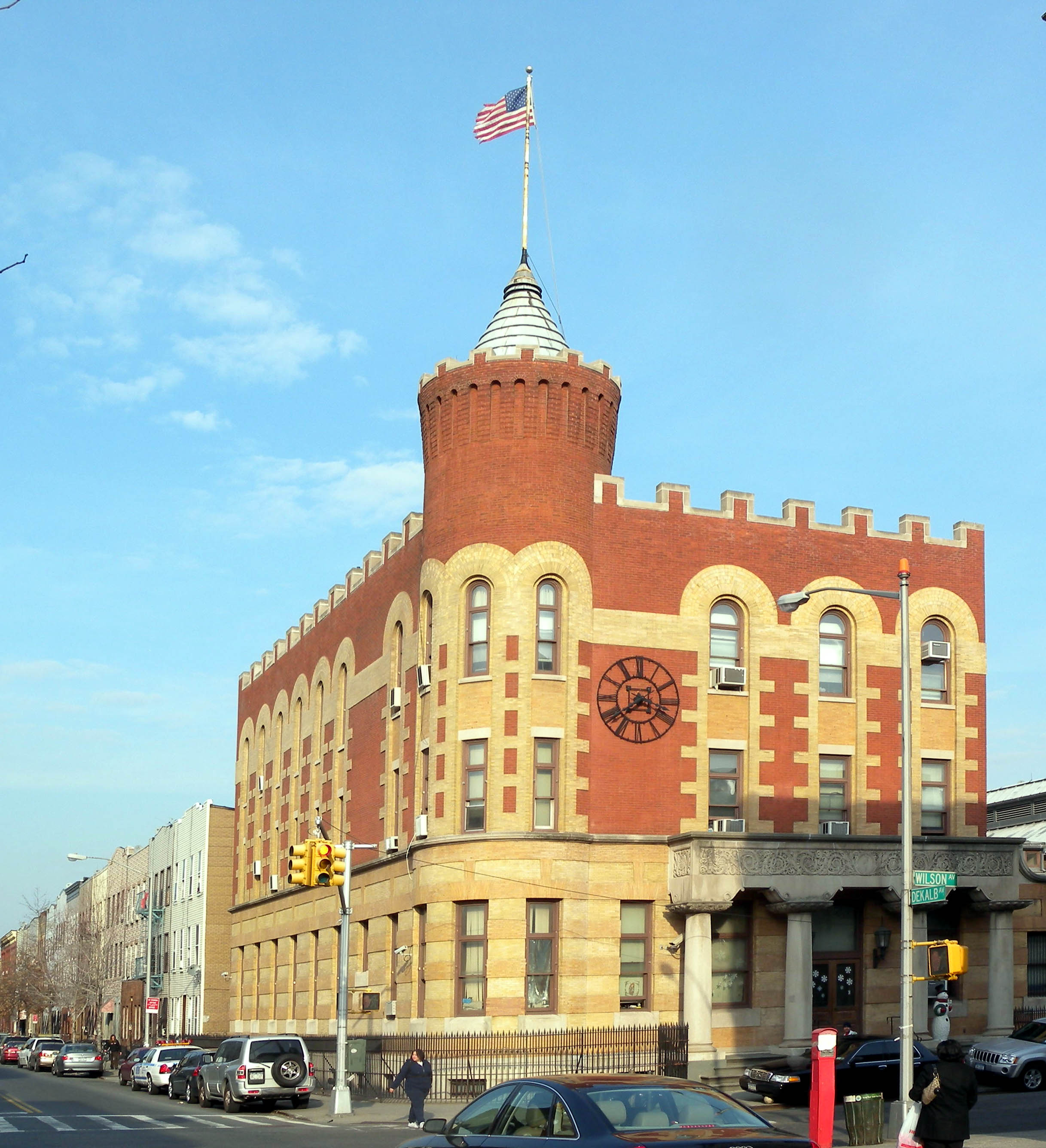
At Wilson Avenue

DeKalb Avenue (/diːˈkælb/ dee-KALB, /ˈdiːkælb/ DEE-kalb) is a thoroughfare in the New York City boroughs of Brooklyn and Queens, with the majority of its length in Brooklyn.

It runs from Woodward Avenue (Linden Hill Cemetery) in Ridgewood, Queens to Downtown Brooklyn, terminating at the Fulton Mall where the Brooklyn Tower and City Point cross.

DeKalb Avenue is named after Baron Johann de Kalb, who served in the American Revolutionary War.

== Notable buildings ==
Landmarks along the avenue include the Pratt Institute, Fort Greene Park, the Brooklyn Hospital Center, the DeKalb and Marcy branches of the Brooklyn Public Library, Long Island University's Brooklyn Campus, Brooklyn Technical High School, and Junior's.

== Transport operation ==
Between Woodward Avenue and Bushwick Avenue, DeKalb Avenue is a two-way, two-lane street; between Bushwick Avenue and Fulton Street, it is one-way westbound. Lafayette Avenue is the corresponding parallel one-way street eastbound.

The B38 bus, operated by MTA New York City Transit, runs along the avenue west of Seneca Avenue. Ridgewood-bound buses run on Lafayette Avenue from Fulton Street to Broadway, then on Kossuth Place until Bushwick Avenue. The B13 also stops on the corridor at Wyckoff Avenue, before deadheading back around via Saint Nicholas Avenue and Hart Street.

A bike lane, installed in 2004 and extended in 2008, exists between Malcolm X Boulevard and Flatbush Avenue. The NYCDOT proposed in 2008 to introduce traffic calming and other improvements to DeKalb Avenue.

== Subway ==
Two New York City Subway stations serve DeKalb Avenue:

- DeKalb Avenue (B, D, N, Q, R, and W trains) on the BMT Fourth Avenue Line and BMT Brighton Line
- DeKalb Avenue (L train) on the BMT Canarsie Line

In addition, the following subway stations are within one or two blocks of DeKalb Avenue:

- Nevins Street (2, 3, 4, and 5 trains) on the IRT Eastern Parkway Line
- Lafayette Avenue (A and C trains) on the IND Fulton Street Line
- Fulton Street, Clinton–Washington Avenues, Classon Avenue, and Bedford–Nostrand Avenues (G train) on the IND Crosstown Line
- Kosciuszko Street (J train) on the BMT Jamaica Line
- Central Avenue (M train) on the BMT Myrtle Avenue Line
