= Bedford Avenue (disambiguation) =

Bedford Avenue may refer to:

- Bedford Avenue (Brooklyn), the longest street in Brooklyn, New York City

== New York City Subway stations ==
- Bedford Avenue (BMT Canarsie Line) at North Seventh Street; serving the L train
- Bedford–Nostrand Avenues (IND Crosstown Line) at Lafayette Avenue; serving the G train
