= Clinton–Washington Avenues station =

Clinton–Washington Avenues station may refer to:

- Clinton–Washington Avenues station (IND Crosstown Line)
- Clinton–Washington Avenues station (IND Fulton Street Line)
