= DeKalb Avenue station (BMT lines) =

New York City Subway station in Brooklyn

DeKalb Avenue
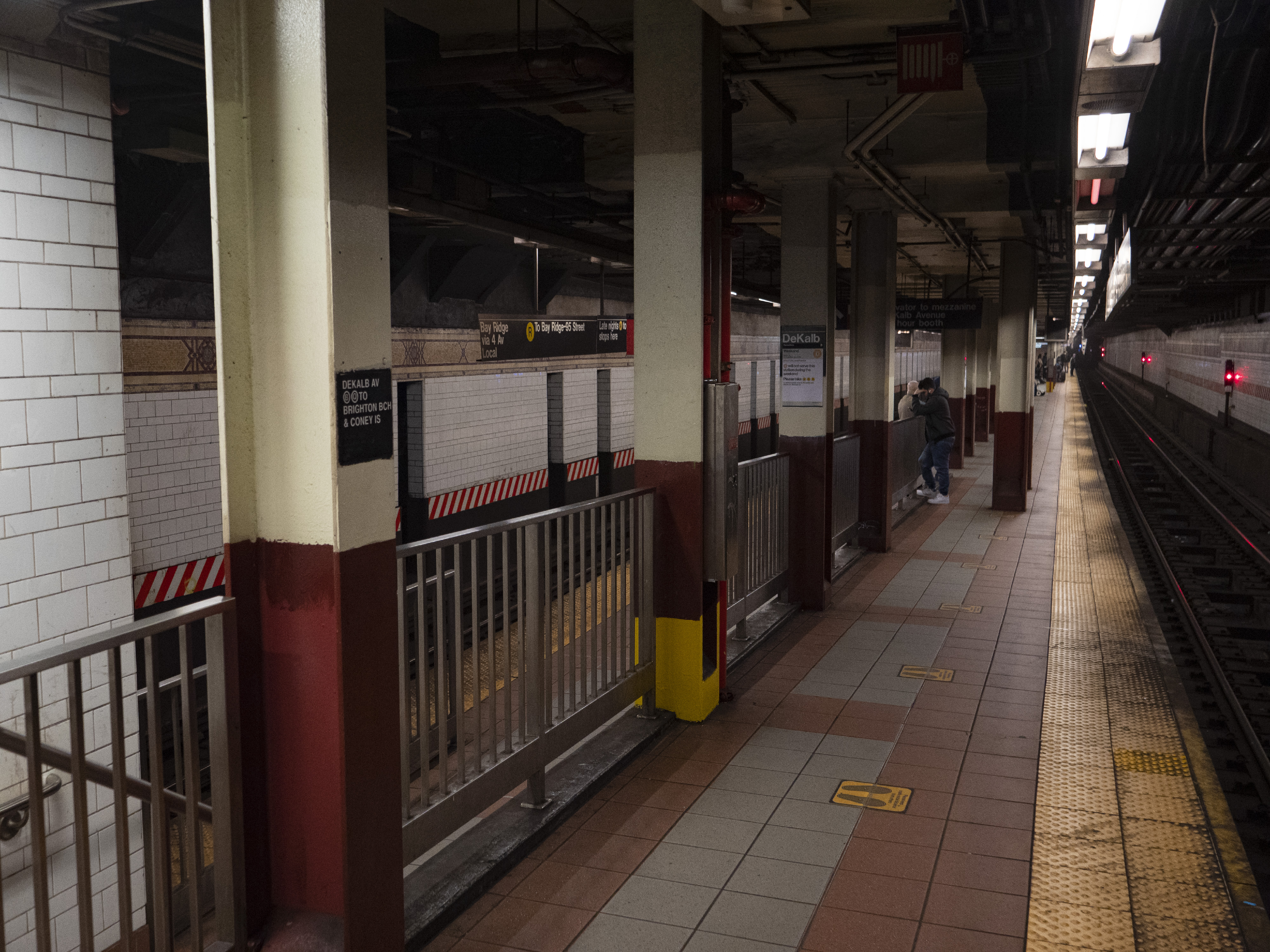
- Southbound platform

Station statistics
- Address: DeKalb Avenue & Flatbush Avenue; Brooklyn, New York
- Borough: Brooklyn
- Locale: Downtown Brooklyn, Fort Greene
- Coordinates: 40.690254°N 73.982277°W
- Division: B (BMT)
- Line: BMT Brighton Line; BMT Fourth Avenue Line
- Services: B (weekdays during the day); D (late nights); N (late nights, and limited rush hour service in the reverse-peak direction); Q (all times); R (all times); W (limited rush hour service only)
- Transit: NYCT Bus: B25, B26, B38, B52, B54
- Structure: Underground
- Platforms: 2 island platforms cross-platform interchange
- Tracks: 6

Other information
- Opened: June 22, 1915; 111 years ago (Fourth Avenue); August 1, 1920; 106 years ago (Brighton)
- Accessible: Yes

Traffic
- 2025: 5,392,856 ▲10.2%
- Rank: 53 out of 423
Services
| Preceding station | New York City Subway | Following station |
|---|---|---|
| Grand Street B D toward 145th Street | B (New York City Subway service) | Atlantic Avenue–Barclays Center B Q via Prospect Park |
| Canal Street Q toward 96th Street | Q (New York City Subway service) | Atlantic Avenue–Barclays Center B Q via Prospect Park |
| Jay Street–MetroTech N R W toward Forest Hills–71st Avenue | Local | Atlantic Avenue–Barclays Center D N R W toward Bay Ridge–95th Street |
Non-revenue services and lines
| Preceding station | New York City Subway | Following station |
|---|---|---|
| Myrtle Avenue Fourth Ave local Bridge; closed | no service | |
Location
Location within New York City Subway
Location within New York City
Location within New York
Track layout
Street map
Station service legend
| Symbol | Description |
| Stops all times except late nights | Stops all times except late nights |
| Stops all times | Stops all times |
| Stops weekdays during the day | Stops weekdays during the day |
| Stops late nights only | Stops late nights only |
| Stops rush hours only | Stops rush hours only |
| Stops rush hours in the peak direction only | Stops rush hours in the peak direction only |

The DeKalb Avenue station is an interchange station on the BMT Brighton Line and BMT Fourth Avenue Line of the New York City Subway, located at the intersection of DeKalb and Flatbush Avenues in Downtown Brooklyn. It is served by the Q and R trains at all times, the B train on weekdays, and the D and N trains during late nights. During rush hours only, a few W train trips also serve this station.

The station has six tracks and two island platforms. The two innermost tracks are used by Fourth Avenue express trains, which skip the station, while the four outer tracks are used by Brighton Line and Fourth Avenue local trains. The track configuration has been arranged several times. The current configuration dates from a 1956–1961 reconstruction project to straighten the platforms and eliminate a level junction north of the station, which had caused a switching bottleneck. Other plans, such as connections to the BMT Fulton Street Line and IRT Eastern Parkway Line, were considered at times.

== History ==
=== Construction and opening ===
The New York City Board of Estimate approved the construction of the Fourth Avenue Line, a subway line running under Fourth Avenue, in early 1908. The line would run over the Manhattan Bridge to Manhattan at its northern end. Contracts for the Fourth Avenue Line were awarded on May 22, 1908, for the section between 43rd Street and the Manhattan Bridge, but the Board of Estimate did not approve them until October 29, 1909, when a taxpayer's lawsuit regarding the city's debt was settled. Groundbreaking for the first section of the subway, between DeKalb Avenue and 43rd Street (ending at 36th Street), took place on November 13, 1909, at DeKalb Avenue and Flatbush Avenue, after the plans and surveys for the line were completed. The Fourth Avenue Line was assigned to the BRT (after 1923, the Brooklyn–Manhattan Transit Corporation or BMT) in the Dual Contracts, adopted on March 4, 1913. William Bradley built the portion of the line from the intersection of Flatbush Avenue Extension and Willoughby Street to the intersection of Fulton Street and Ashland Place, including the DeKalb Avenue station.

The DeKalb Avenue station was originally intended only as a local station on the Fourth Avenue Line. After the Montague Street Tunnel was approved, the planned station was changed to an express station that could serve trains from both the Manhattan Bridge and the Montague Street Tunnel (there would still be two bypass tracks for Fourth Avenue express trains using the bridge). In November 1914, the New York Public Service Commission began requesting bids for the installation of station finishes at the DeKalb Avenue station. The commission also requested bids for the addition of crossovers, allowing trains from the tunnel or the bridge to stop at DeKalb Avenue. The Public Service Commission awarded the contract for the modifications to Samuel Beskin. To accommodate these crossovers, contractors had to cut into partition walls that had already been built.

The DeKalb Avenue station opened on June 22, 1915, as part of an extension of the subway to Coney Island, which included the Fourth Avenue Line north of 59th Street as well as the entire Sea Beach Line. The station's opening was marked with a competition between two trains heading from Chambers Street station in Manhattan to the Coney Island station, one heading via the West End Line and the other via the Sea Beach Line; the latter got to Coney Island first. As a local station, the DeKalb Avenue station was originally 435 feet (133 m) long.

Also as part of the Dual Contracts, an extension of the Brighton Line was approved. The extension was to run under St. Felix Street in Downtown Brooklyn, splitting off the Fourth Avenue Line south of the DeKalb Avenue station. It would then run under Flatbush Avenue south of Atlantic Avenue, sharing a tunnel with the Interborough Rapid Transit Company (IRT)'s Eastern Parkway Line. The Brighton Line extension opened on August 1, 1920, serving the DeKalb Avenue station with the Fourth Avenue Line and providing direct service between the existing Brighton Line and Midtown Manhattan. Afterward, the DeKalb Avenue station was referred to as "the heart of the BMT", as it is a major transfer point between BMT services with lines splitting north and south of the station.

=== 1920s to 1950s ===
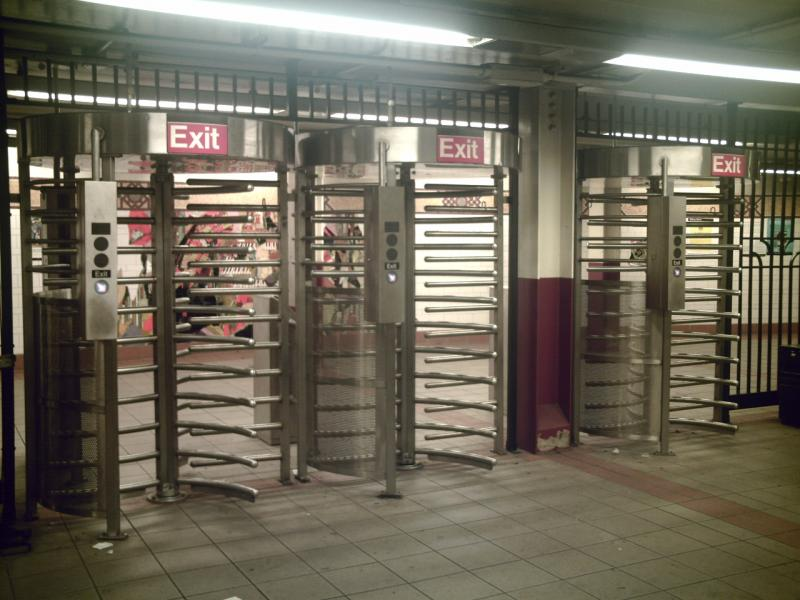
HEET turnstiles

In 1922, the New York State Transit Commission directed its engineers to prepare plans for lengthening the platforms at 23 stations on the BMT's lines to accommodate eight-car trains. As part of the project, platforms would be lengthened to 530 feet (160 m). Though the Transit Commission ordered the BMT to lengthen these platforms in September 1923, no further progress was made until February 16, 1925, when the New York City Board of Transportation (BOT) commissioned its engineers to examine platform-lengthening plans for DeKalb Avenue and eleven other stations along the Fourth Avenue Line. It estimated the project would cost $633,000 (equivalent to $11,621,000 in 2025). The New York City Board of Estimate appropriated $362,841 for the lengthening of the platforms at DeKalb Avenue and five other stations in January 1926 and awarded the contract to Charles Meads & Company early the next month. As part of the project, the original signal tower at the end of the platform was demolished to make way for the platform extension, and a new signal tower was built to control traffic on the Manhattan Bridge and Montague Street Tunnel. The platform extension at DeKalb Avenue opened on August 1, 1927.

The Dime Savings Bank, which had its headquarters at 9 DeKalb Avenue just above the station, opened a branch on the station's mezzanine level in August 1956. The opening of the bank branch followed several months of negotiations. The bank had wanted to open a corridor from the station directly into its building, but this was not possible because of the presence of various underground conduits, pipes, and emergency exits, so the bank decided instead to rent space in the station.

=== Track reconfiguration ===
The station has been reconfigured a number of times. Originally, the extreme outside tracks in each direction hosted the Fourth Avenue Line local tracks and the next pair hosted the Brighton Line. The middle tracks, which bypassed the station, hosted the Fourth Avenue express tracks. A group of level crossovers at the northern end of the station allowed all tracks access to both sides of the Manhattan Bridge and to the Montague Street Tunnel. The Fourth Avenue local tracks led straight onto the Manhattan Bridge west of the station, while the Brighton line tracks led straight to the Montague Street Tunnel, so the crossovers allowed trains from both lines to switch between the bridge and the tunnel.

The city government took over the BMT's operations on June 1, 1940. By then, the original track layout caused many train delays on the Fourth Avenue and Brighton lines. In 1952, the junction was earmarked for "top priority" reconstruction. On November 30, 1955, the New York City Transit Authority sent a recommendation to the Board of Estimate for the approval of a $13,152,831 contract to eliminate the bottleneck. The elimination of the bottleneck was the first step in a larger plan to improve transit service between Brooklyn and Manhattan. The Citizens Budget Commission recommended that the appropriation be canceled, but three other civic groups opposed the elimination of the funding.

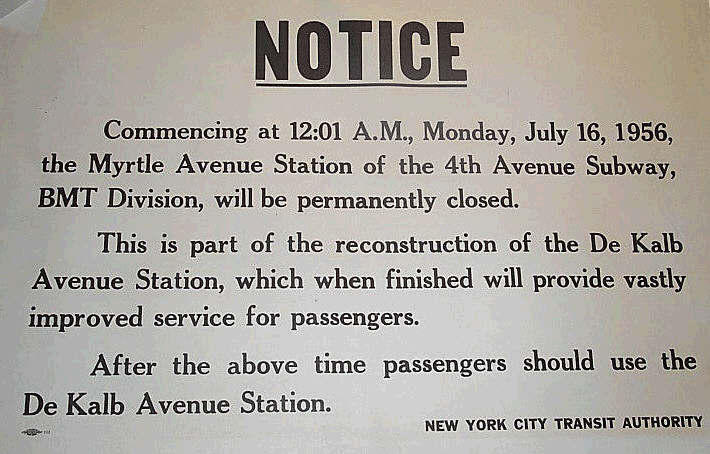
Myrtle Avenue closing notice

During the reconstruction of the junction that started in 1956 and was completed by April 1961, the Brighton Line tracks were connected to the DeKalb Avenue station's outermost tracks. A diamond crossover north of the station had caused frequent bottlenecks, but was removed during the realignment and replaced with two flying junctions. All switches immediately north of the station were eliminated. The junction towards the Manhattan Bridge was rebuilt. To make room for a new flying junction, the Myrtle Avenue station was closed. That station's northbound platform remains visible from passing trains, but the southbound platform was demolished to accommodate the new flying junction that replaced the diamond crossover. Platform lengths were doubled to accommodate ten-car trains of 60-foot-long (18 m) cars. It was estimated that the reconstruction of the junction increased the junction's train capacity by 25%.

The Chrystie Street Connection project was also tied to this improvement, as it resulted in more trains using the bridge, as well as connecting trains to the Independent Subway System (IND)'s Sixth Avenue Line (and thus, to IND lines to the Bronx and Queens). Over the years, as more of the business community migrated to Midtown Manhattan, the slower tunnel route via Lower Manhattan became less popular. When the Chrystie Street Connection opened in 1967, the station became a transfer point for trains to and from the IND Sixth Avenue Line.

=== Station overhauls ===
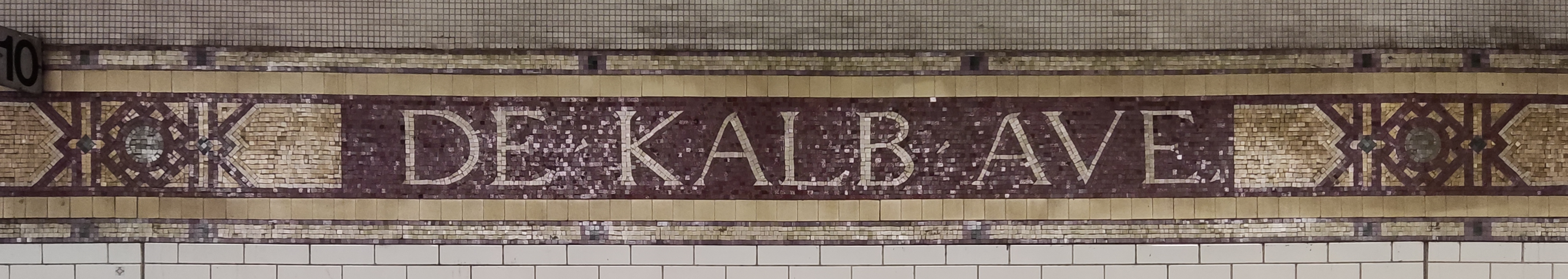
Station name mosaic

After the 1961 reconstruction, some adjustments were made to the station. The original platform extensions were closed and replaced by straight extensions to the north in 1960. The abandoned portions can be seen from the open platforms and trains. In the mid-1960s, the station platforms were extended northward at least 150 feet (46 m) to accommodate for a 600 feet (180 m) train. It also added new '60s modern look tiling.

The Metropolitan Transportation Authority (MTA) announced in late 1978 that it would modernize the DeKalb Avenue station. The improvements included new finishes on the walls and floors; acoustical, signage, and lighting improvements; replacement of old mechanical equipment; and new handrails. In spite of the renovation, the MTA listed the station among the 69 most deteriorated stations in the subway system in 1981.

In the early 2000s, architect Lee Harris Pomeroy designed a renovation of the DeKalb Avenue station. The plans included adding elevators for ADA accessibility, as well as restoring the original station tiles and mosaics. The latest major overhaul was in 2004–2006. The station was repaired and became an ADA-accessible station. The MTA repaired the staircases, retiled the walls, added new tiles to the floors, upgraded the station's lights and public address system, installed ADA yellow safety treads along the platform edge and replaced the trackbeds for all trains entering or bypassing the station. It also installed elevators on both platforms, as well as elevators to the street level.

== Station layout ==
This underground station has six tracks with island platforms between the two outer pairs of tracks, while the two center tracks bypass the station. B trains stop here on weekdays only except nights, Q and R trains stop here at all times, and D and N trains stop here during nights as well as northbound on weekdays after 6:45 p.m. The platform columns are painted red on their lower halves and cream on their upper halves. The next station to the north is Jay Street–MetroTech for Montague Street Tunnel R and late night N trains, Canal Street for N and Q trains using the southern tracks of the Manhattan Bridge, and Grand Street for B and D trains using the northern tracks of the Manhattan Bridge. The next station to the south is Atlantic Avenue–Barclays Center on the Fourth Avenue Line for D, N, and R trains and Atlantic Avenue–Barclays Center on the Brighton Line for B and Q trains, although they are different platforms and formerly different stations.

=== Exits ===
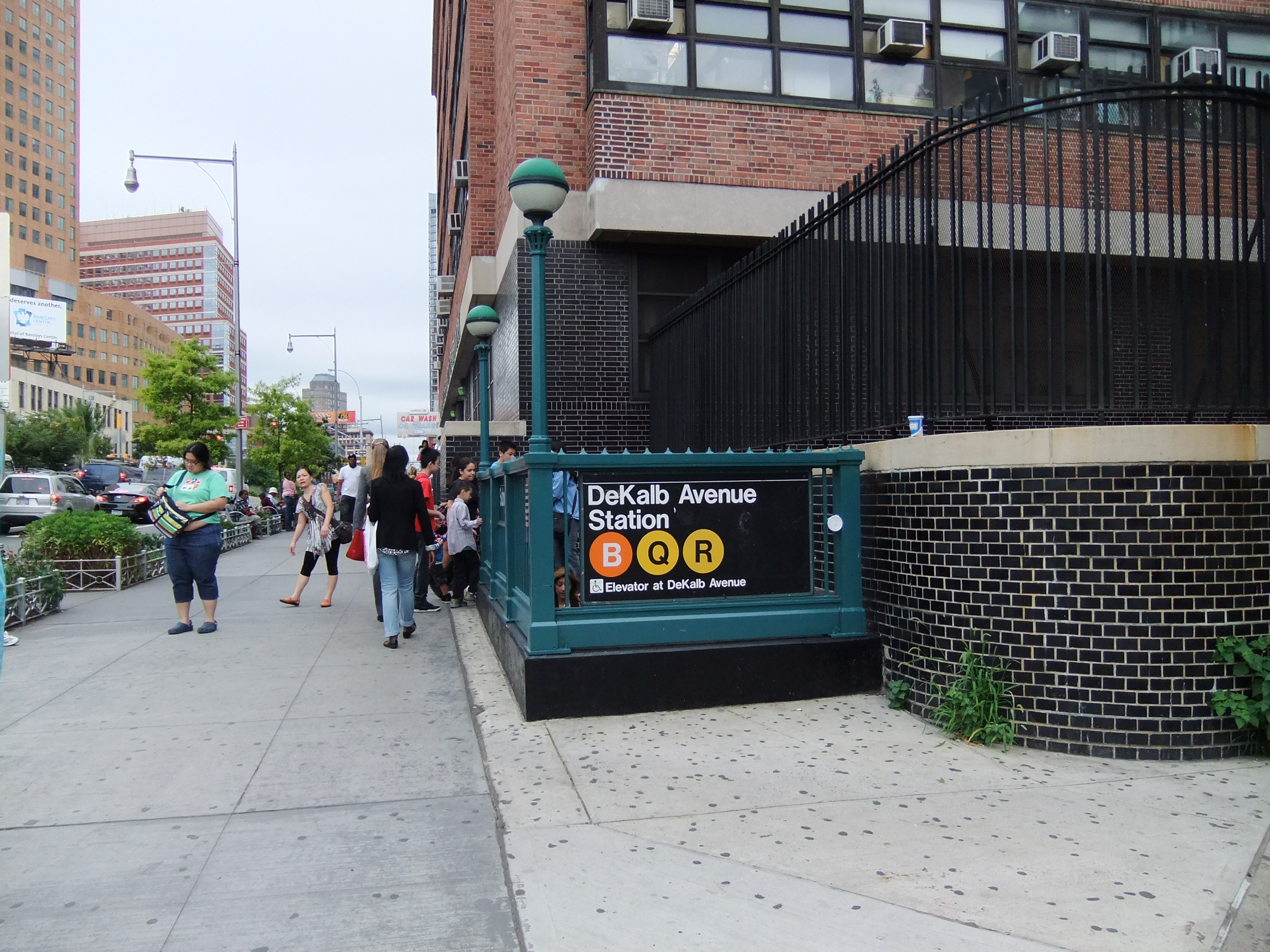
Street stair

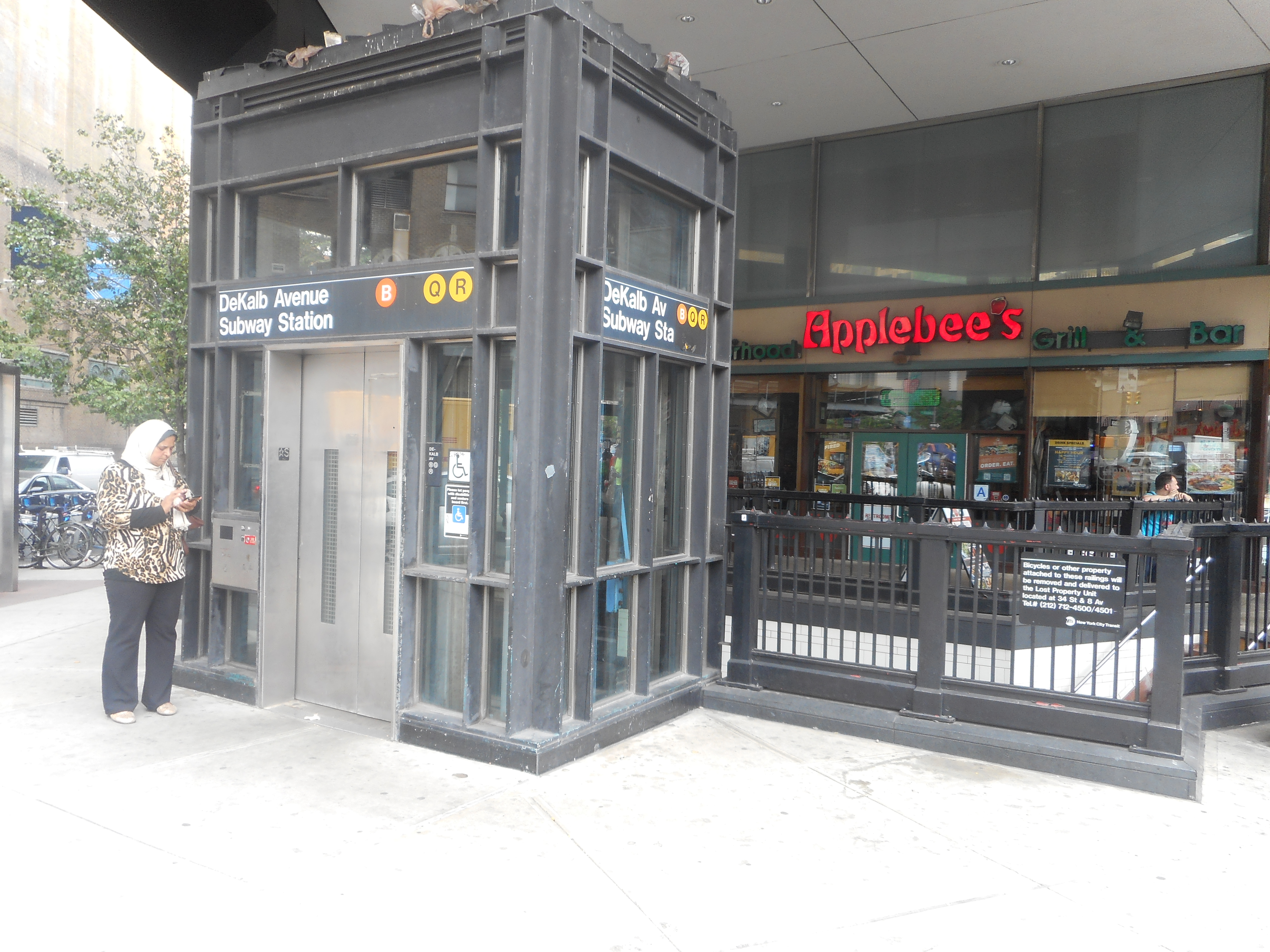
Elevator and stair outside the now-closed Applebee's restaurant

This station has two entrances/exits, each with access to either the east or west side of Flatbush Avenue. The staffed exit is near the south end and has two staircases and one elevator from each platform that go up to a waiting area above the platforms and tracks that contains two restrooms open from 5:00 a.m. to midnight. Outside of the turnstile bank is a token booth, a single street stair to the southwest corner of DeKalb Avenue and the Flatbush Avenue Extension built inside a store front, and two staircases that meet at their landings and an elevator that go up to the southeast corner outside a former Applebee's restaurant. The centers of the platforms have a crossover that connects them both. Both the crossover and the staffed exit were part of a wide mezzanine area, but most of the mezzanine was closed off and converted to crew rooms.

The other entrance/exit is at the station's extreme north end and is unstaffed. An up-only escalator and long staircase from each platform goes up to a mezzanine above the tracks. Two pairs of exit-only turnstiles and one set of four turnstiles provide entrance/exit from the system. This entrance has two street stairs: one to Fleet Street on the east side, outside Long Island University Brooklyn, and the other to the former Albee Square on the west side, outside the City Point development.

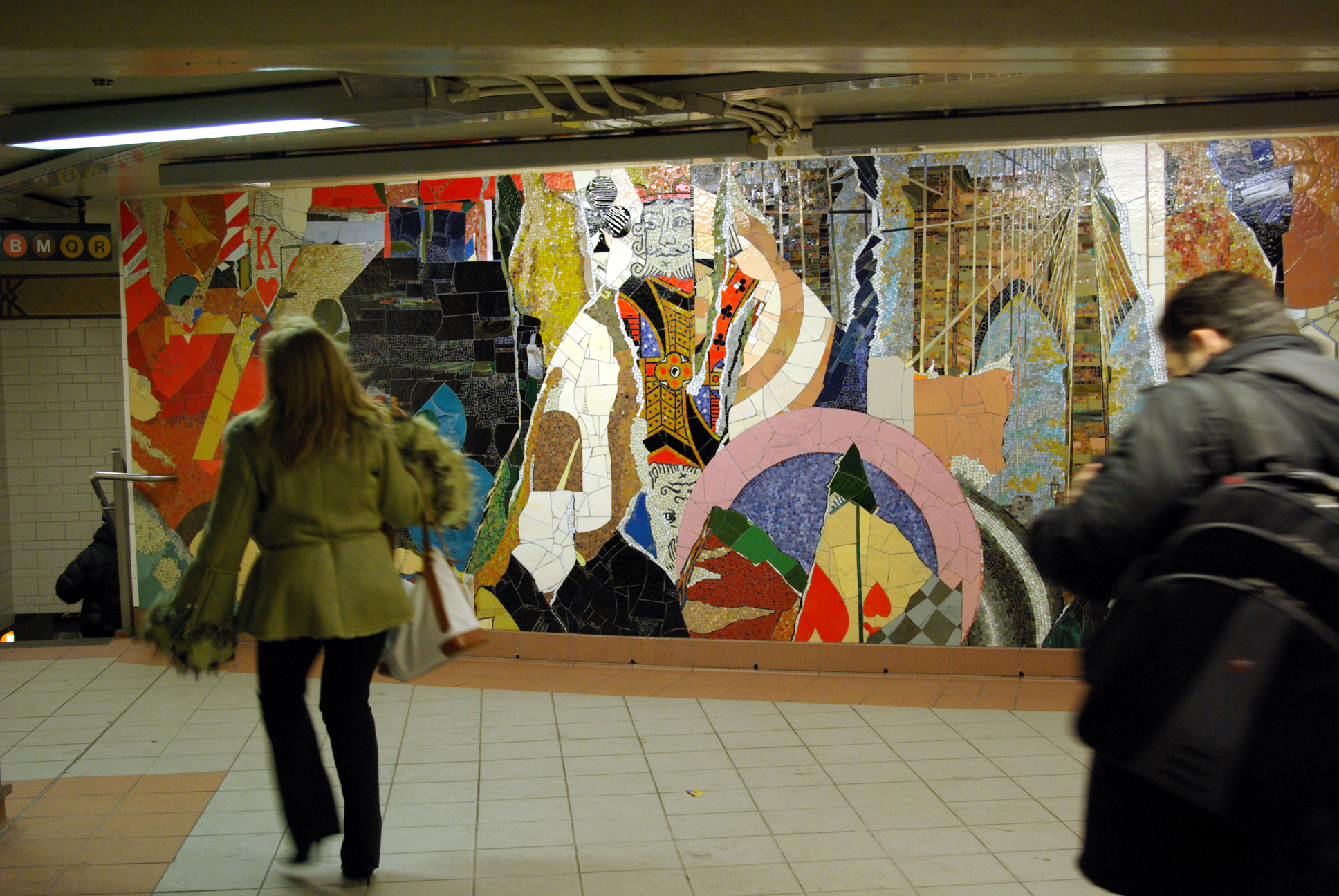
Detail of DeKalb Improvisation artwork

Both fare control areas feature a 2005 artwork called DeKalb Improvisation by Stephen Johnson. It consists of a large mural in the main fare control area and several smaller ones in the secondary one.

=== Track layout ===
North of the station, the outer and bypass tracks head towards the Manhattan Bridge to Manhattan with a flying junction. B and D trains use the north side of the bridge via the Chrystie Street Connection to the IND Sixth Avenue Line. N and Q trains use the south side of the bridge to the BMT Broadway Line. Trains traveling through this interlocking are frequently delayed, since Brighton and Fourth Avenue trains have to cross over each other to use both the Broadway and Sixth Avenue Lines. R trains and late night N trains continue on the middle tracks north along the BMT Fourth Avenue Line into the Montague Street Tunnel towards the BMT Broadway Line.

South of the station, the bypass tracks become the express tracks on the Fourth Avenue Line. The four remaining tracks become six tracks at a flying junction. Trains headed south on the tunnel local tracks or outer tracks proceed to the BMT Brighton Line or switch from those two tracks and provide the route to the Fourth Avenue Line local tracks. In the current service pattern, the tunnel route is not used for Brighton Line trains. Also south of this station, there is a bellmouth where the northbound track of the Brighton Line curves northwest onto Fulton Street. The bellmouth marks the location where the westbound track of the proposed Ashland Place Connection, which would have connected to the now-demolished BMT Fulton Street El, would have merged with the Brighton Line. The eastbound track of the Ashland Place Connection was not built. The track would have diverged from the southbound Brighton Line between Ashland Place and St. Felix Street, then curved east under Lafayette Avenue, to avoid an at-grade junction with the Brighton Line.

The DeKalb Avenue station was also built with provisions for a possible track connection to Nevins Street station. The station has a shortened mezzanine because room was needed for a proposed Lafayette Avenue line. The subway connection was never built. North of this station, near the Manhattan Bridge, there is a provision for a never-built loop back to southern Brooklyn without crossing the Manhattan Bridge into Manhattan. Bellmouths for the unbuilt loop are visible from passing trains. South of this station, a junction was built at Fulton Street for a never-built branch to run via Lafayette Avenue and Broadway.

=== Service patterns ===
| Jay Street–MetroTech (BMT Fourth Avenue Line) | Canal Street (BMT Broadway Line) | Grand Street (IND Sixth Avenue Line) |
North-west of the station
| BMT Fourth Avenue Line local N (late nights); R (all times); W (limited rush hour service only) | BMT Broadway Line; N (all except late nights); Q (all times) | IND Sixth Avenue Line express B (weekdays during the day); D (all times) |
| tunnel tracks | Manhattan Bridge south | Manhattan Bridge north |
In the station
| inner platform tracks (tunnel); N (late nights); R (all times); W (limited rush hour service only) | center tracks (bridge, bypass); D (all except late nights); N (all except late nights) | outermost tracks (bridge); B (weekdays during the day); D (late nights); Q (all times) |
South of the station
| BMT Fourth Avenue Line local D (late nights); N (late nights); R (all times); W (limited rush hour service only) | BMT Fourth Avenue Line express D (all except late nights); N (all except late nights) | BMT Brighton Line; B (weekday rush hours, middays and early evenings); Q (all times) |
| Atlantic Avenue–Barclays Center (BMT Fourth Avenue Line) | | Atlantic Avenue–Barclays Center (BMT Brighton Line) |
