= Fulton Street station (IND Crosstown Line) =

New York City Subway station in Brooklyn

Fulton Street
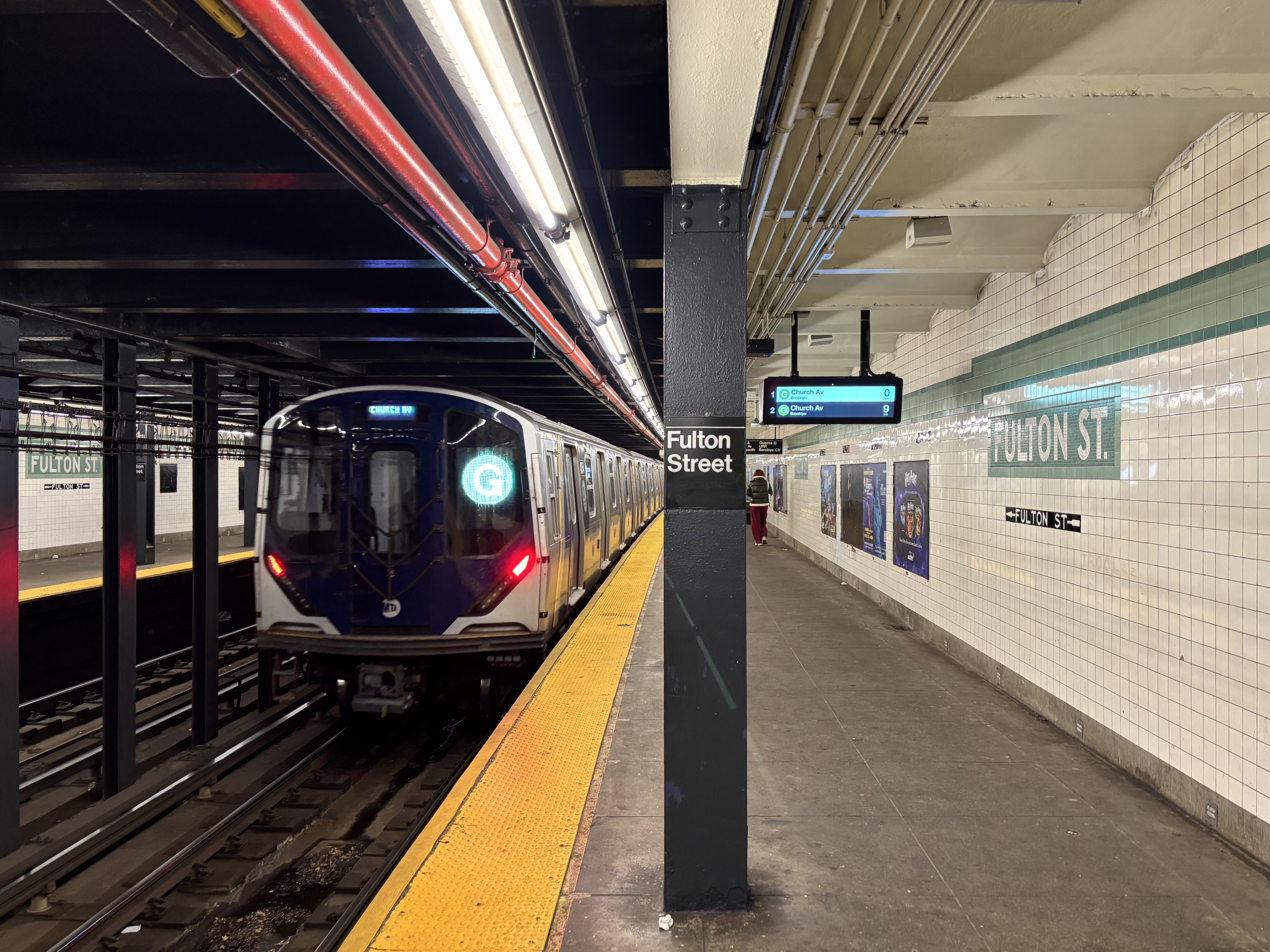
- R211T G train departing from the southbound platform

Station statistics
- Address: Fulton Street & Lafayette Avenue; Brooklyn, New York
- Borough: Brooklyn
- Locale: Fort Greene
- Coordinates: 40.686984°N 73.976269°W
- Division: B (IND)
- Line: IND Crosstown Line
- Services: G (all times)
- Transit: NYCT Bus: B25, B26, B38, B52
- Structure: Underground
- Platforms: 2 side platforms
- Tracks: 2

Other information
- Opened: July 1, 1937; 89 years ago

Traffic
- 2025: 1,600,215 ▲11.9%
- Rank: 221 out of 423
Services
Preceding station	New York City Subway	Following station
Clinton–Washington Avenues toward Court Square	G (New York City Subway service)	Hoyt–Schermerhorn Streets toward Church Avenue
Location
Location within New York City Subway
Location within New York City
Location within New York
Track layout
Street map
Station service legend
Symbol	Description
Stops all times	Stops all times

The Fulton Street station is a station on the IND Crosstown Line of the New York City Subway, located on Lafayette Avenue between South Portland Avenue and Fulton Street in Fort Greene, Brooklyn. It is served by the G train at all times.

== History ==
This station opened on July 1, 1937, when the entire Crosstown Line was completed between Nassau Avenue and its connection to the IND Culver Line. On this date, the GG was extended in both directions to Smith–Ninth Streets and Forest Hills–71st Avenue.

== Station layout ==
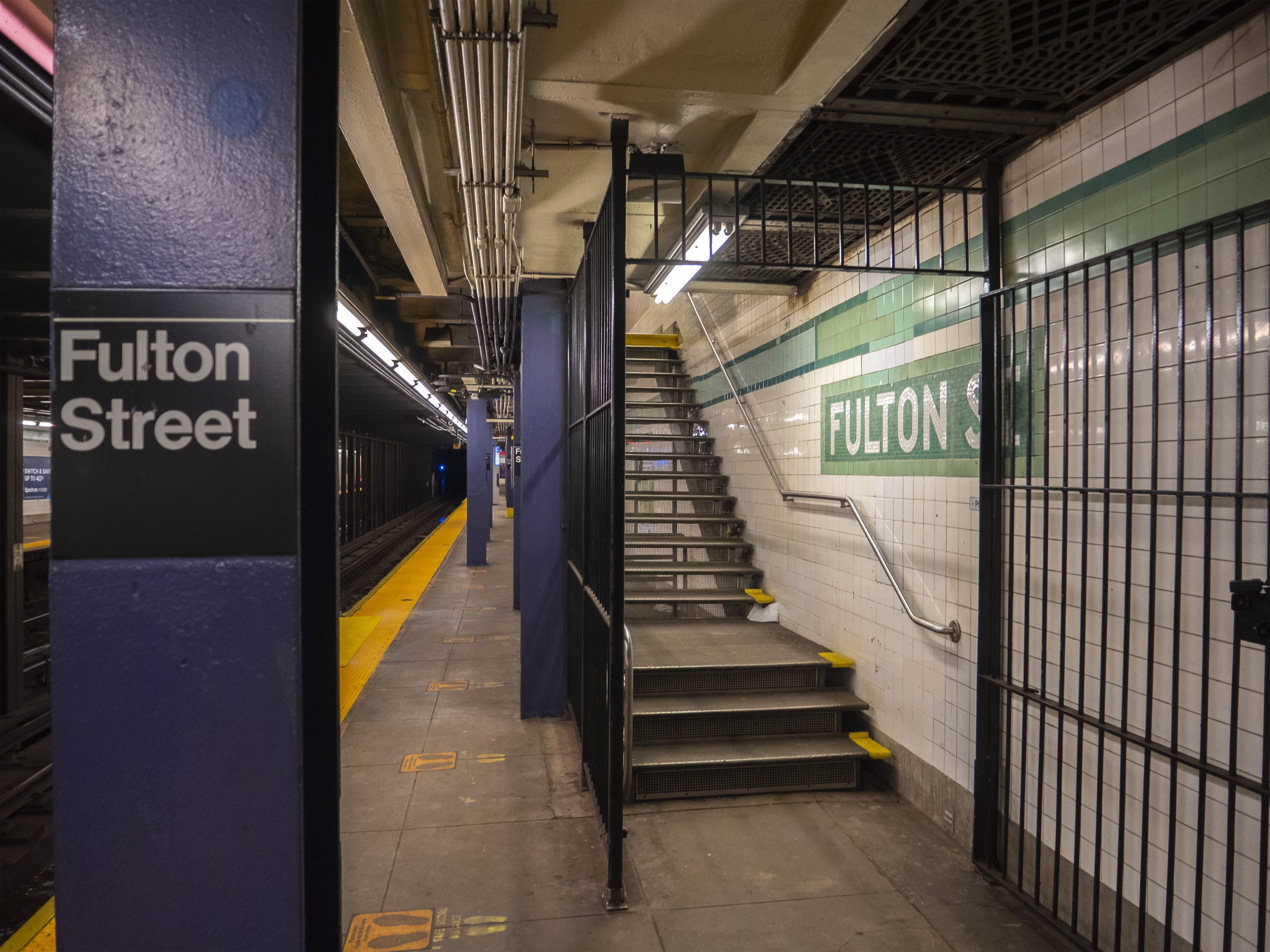
South Portland Avenue exit staircase on the northbound platform

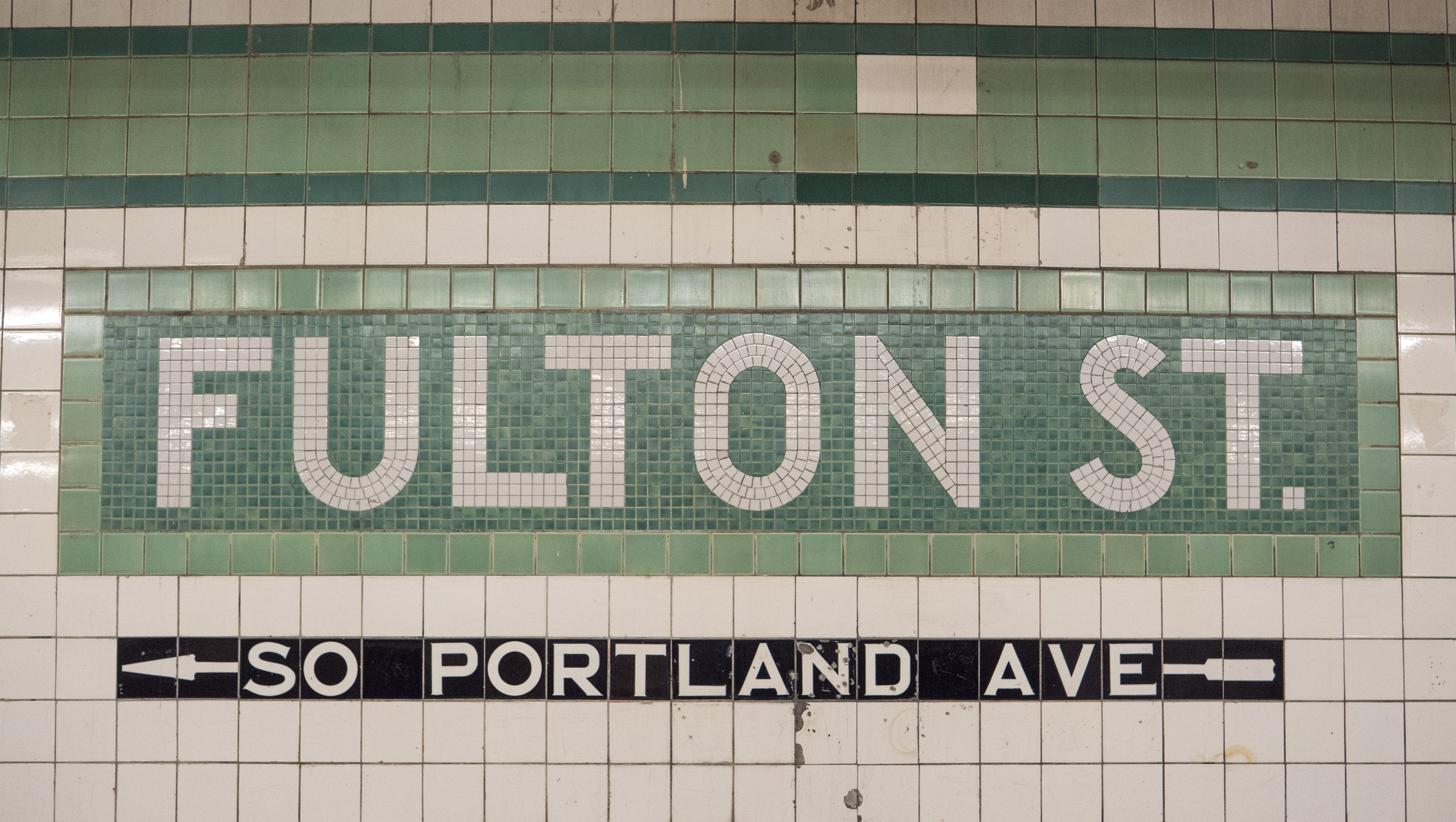
Mosaic name tablet and directional sign

This underground station has two tracks and two side platforms. The G stops at the station at all times. The station is between Clinton–Washington Avenues to the north and Hoyt–Schermerhorn Streets to the south.

Both platforms have a lime green trim line with a dark green border and mosaic name tablets reading "FULTON ST." in white sans-serif font on a dark green background and lime green border. Small black "FULTON" tile captions in white lettering run below the trim line at regular intervals and directional signs in the same style are below some of the name tablets. The tiles were part of a color-coded tile system used throughout the IND. The tile colors were designed to facilitate navigation for travelers going away from Lower Manhattan. Because the Crosstown Line does not merge into a line that enters Manhattan at either end, all stations on the line had green tiles. Blue I-beam columns run along both platforms at regular intervals with alternating ones having the standard black station name plate in white lettering.

The station is very close to the Crosstown Line's junction with the IND Fulton Street Line just west of Lafayette Avenue, although the two stations do not have an in-system transfer. Riders on Manhattan-bound A and C trains can catch a glimpse of this station's platforms as well as the northbound track of the Crosstown Line through the right-side windows a few seconds after leaving Lafayette Avenue. There is an employee-only connection between the two stations via the tunnels.

A proposed transfer to the busy Atlantic Avenue–Barclays Center complex was rejected by the MTA due to the long walking distance between the two stations.

=== Exits ===
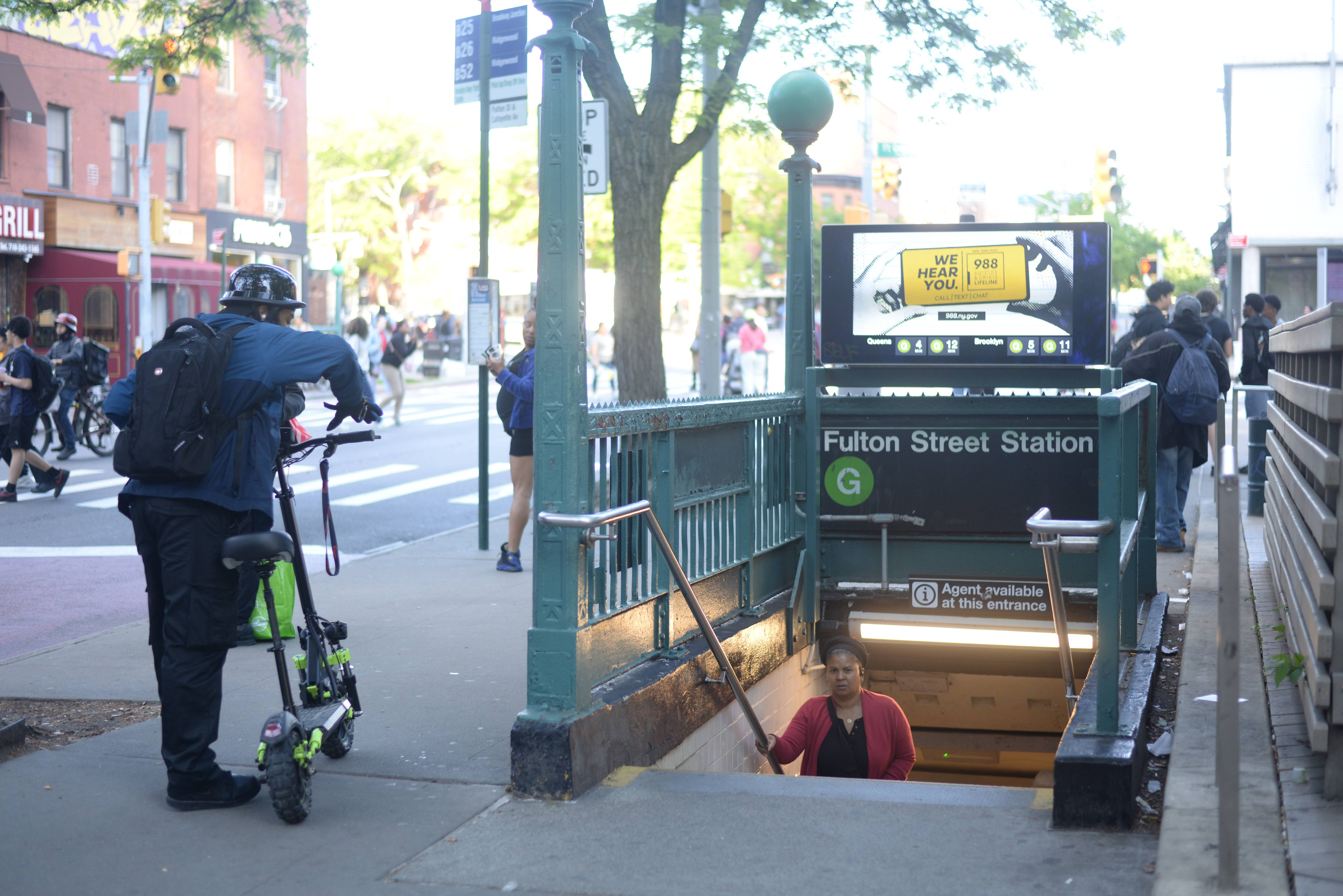
Entrance in Fowler Square, at the west end of the station.

The station's full-time fare control area is at the extreme south (geographical west) end of the Church Avenue-bound platform. A bank of turnstiles at platform level leads to a token booth and one staircase going up to the northeast corner of Lafayette Avenue and Fulton Street. A crossunder here connects to the Queens-bound platform.

This station has a mezzanine above the platforms and tracks near the north end. However, most of it has been converted to employee-use only and the staircases leading up to it from the platforms are gated shut or sealed off. At the extreme north (geographical east) end of the station, a single open staircase from each platform goes up to a single full-height turnstile before a staircase goes up to either western corner of South Portland and Lafayette Avenues, the northwestern one for the Church Avenue-bound platform and the southwestern one for the Queens-bound platform. These exits were closed in the mid-1980s due to concerns over maintenance expense and potential crime, but the southwestern corner entrance (for northbound trains) was reopened in July 2005 following community pressure, while the northwestern corner entrance (for southbound trains) was reopened some time between January and June 2009.

== Nearby points of interest ==
- Barclays Center
- Brooklyn Academy of Music
- Brooklyn Technical High School
- Fort Greene Park
- Irondale Center
- Mark Morris Dance Center
- MoCADA
