= Bedford–Nostrand Avenues station =

New York City Subway station in Brooklyn

Bedford–Nostrand Avenues
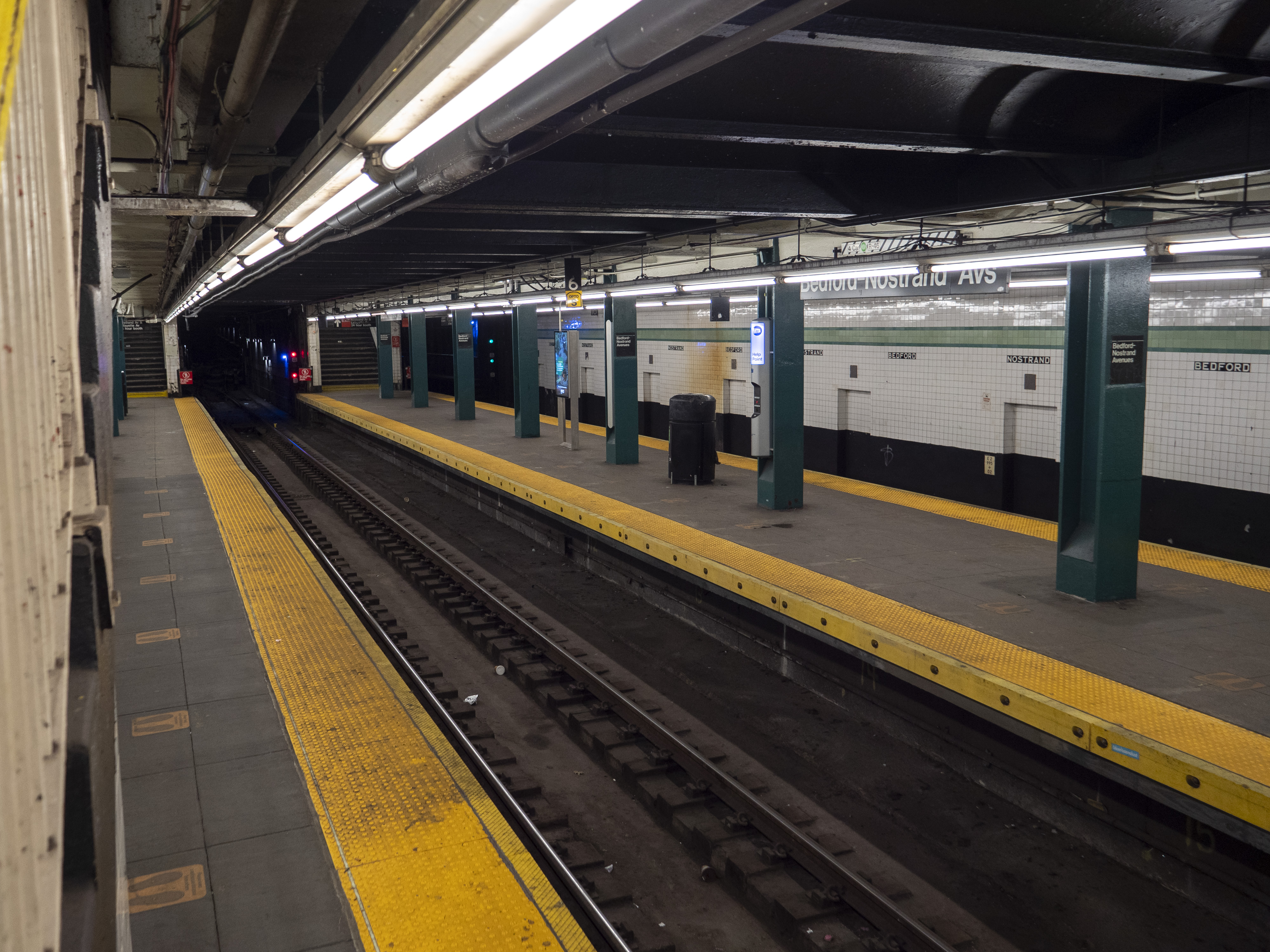
- View from southbound platform

Station statistics
- Address: Lafayette Avenue between Nostrand Avenue & Bedford Avenue; Brooklyn, New York
- Borough: Brooklyn
- Locale: Bedford–Stuyvesant
- Coordinates: 40.689587°N 73.953567°W
- Division: B (IND)
- Line: IND Crosstown Line
- Services: G (all times)
- Transit: NYCT Bus: B38, B44, B44 SBS
- Structure: Underground
- Platforms: 2 island platforms cross-platform interchange
- Tracks: 3 (2 in regular service)

Other information
- Opened: July 1, 1937 (89 years ago)
- Accessible: No; planned

Traffic
- 2025: 2,213,779 ▲9.3%
- Rank: 167 out of 423
Services
Preceding station	New York City Subway	Following station
Myrtle–Willoughby Avenues toward Court Square	G (New York City Subway service)	Classon Avenue toward Church Avenue
Location
Location within New York City Subway
Location within New York City
Location within New York
Track layout
Street map
Station service legend
Symbol	Description
Stops all times	Stops all times

The Bedford–Nostrand Avenues station is a station on the IND Crosstown Line of the New York City Subway. Located at Lafayette Avenue between Bedford and Nostrand Avenues in Bedford–Stuyvesant, Brooklyn, it is served by the G train at all times.

== History ==
This station opened on July 1, 1937, when the entire Crosstown Line was completed between Nassau Avenue and its connection to the IND Culver Line. On this date, the GG was extended in both directions to Smith–Ninth Streets and Forest Hills–71st Avenue.

In July 2025, the MTA announced that it would install elevators at 12 stations, including the Bedford–Nostrand Avenues station, as part of its 2025–2029 capital program. The elevators would make the station fully compliant with the Americans with Disabilities Act of 1990.

== Station layout ==
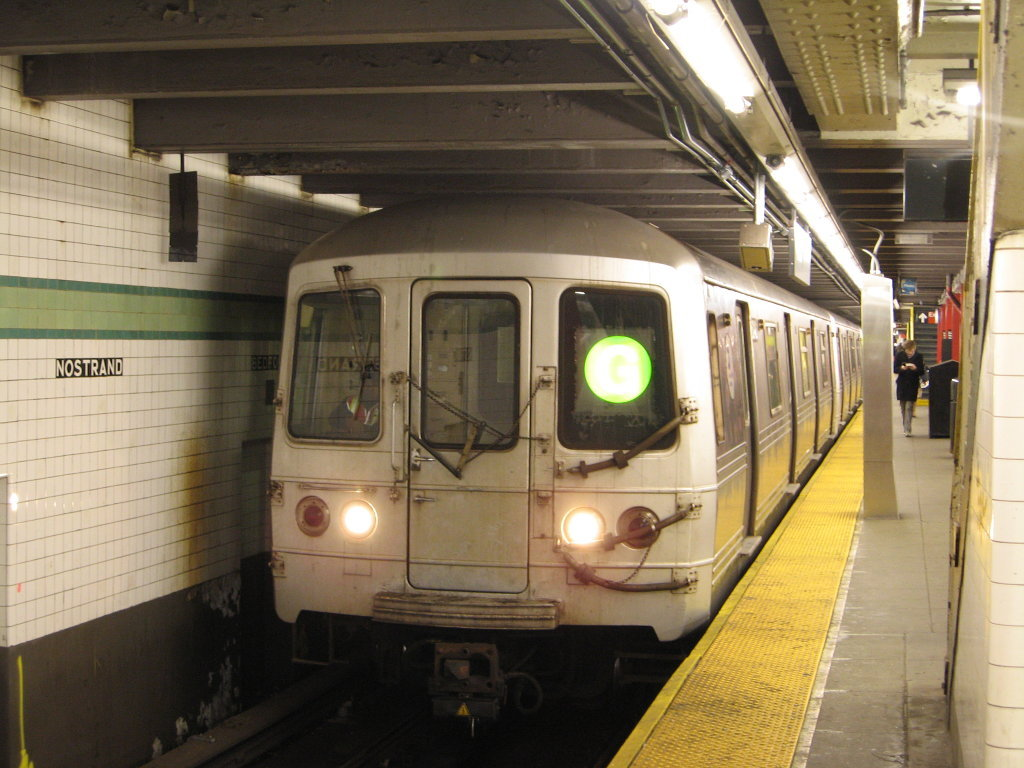
An R46 G train arrives at the station

This underground station has three tracks and two island platforms. The G stops at the station at all times. The station is between Myrtle–Willoughby Avenues to the north and Classon Avenue to the south.

Both outer track walls have a light green trim line with a dark green border. Below the trim line are small black tile captions at regular intervals that alternate between "BEDFORD" and "NOSTRAND" in white lettering. The tiles were part of a color-coded tile system used throughout the IND. The tile colors were designed to facilitate navigation for travelers going away from Lower Manhattan. Because the Crosstown Line does not merge into a line that enters Manhattan at either end, all stations on the line had green tiles. Both platforms have green I-beam columns (formerly painted red) running along them at regular intervals, alternating ones having the standard black station name plate in white lettering.

=== Exits ===
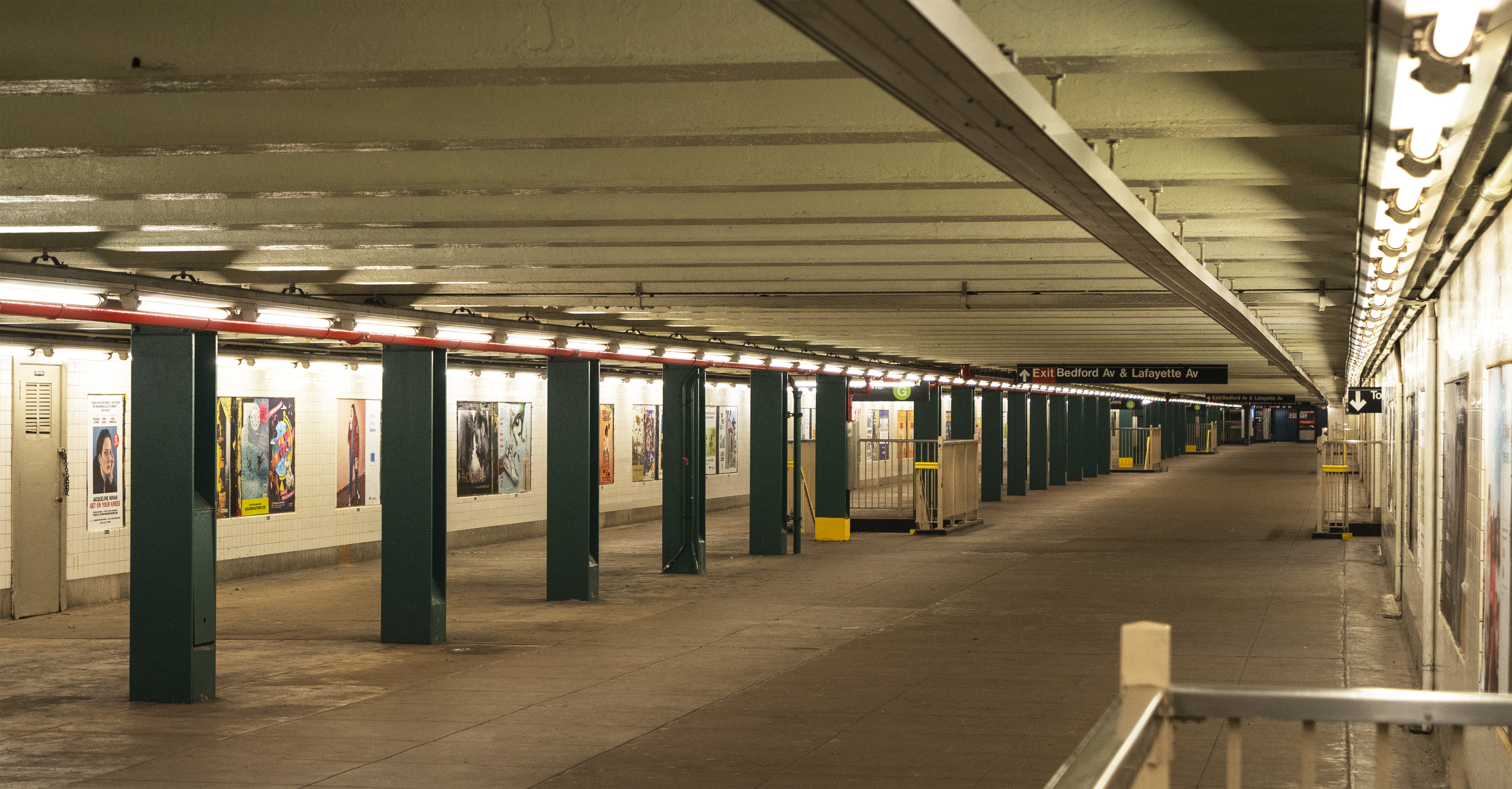
Station mezzanine

This station has a full-length mezzanine above the platforms and tracks with staircases to each side at regular intervals that connect the two fare control areas. The full-time one is at the north (geographical east) end. It has a turnstile bank, token booth, two staircases going up to the western corners of Nostrand and Lafayette Avenues, and two more staircases going up to the eastern corners of Nostrand and Lafayette Avenues that have since been boarded up. The fare control area at the south (geographical west) end of the mezzanine is unstaffed, containing just full height turnstiles and staircases to all corners of Bedford and Lafayette Avenues. However, the two staircases on the western corners have been boarded up. They had been previously exit-only. A gate seals off the passageway towards the stairs.

=== Middle track and expansion provisions ===
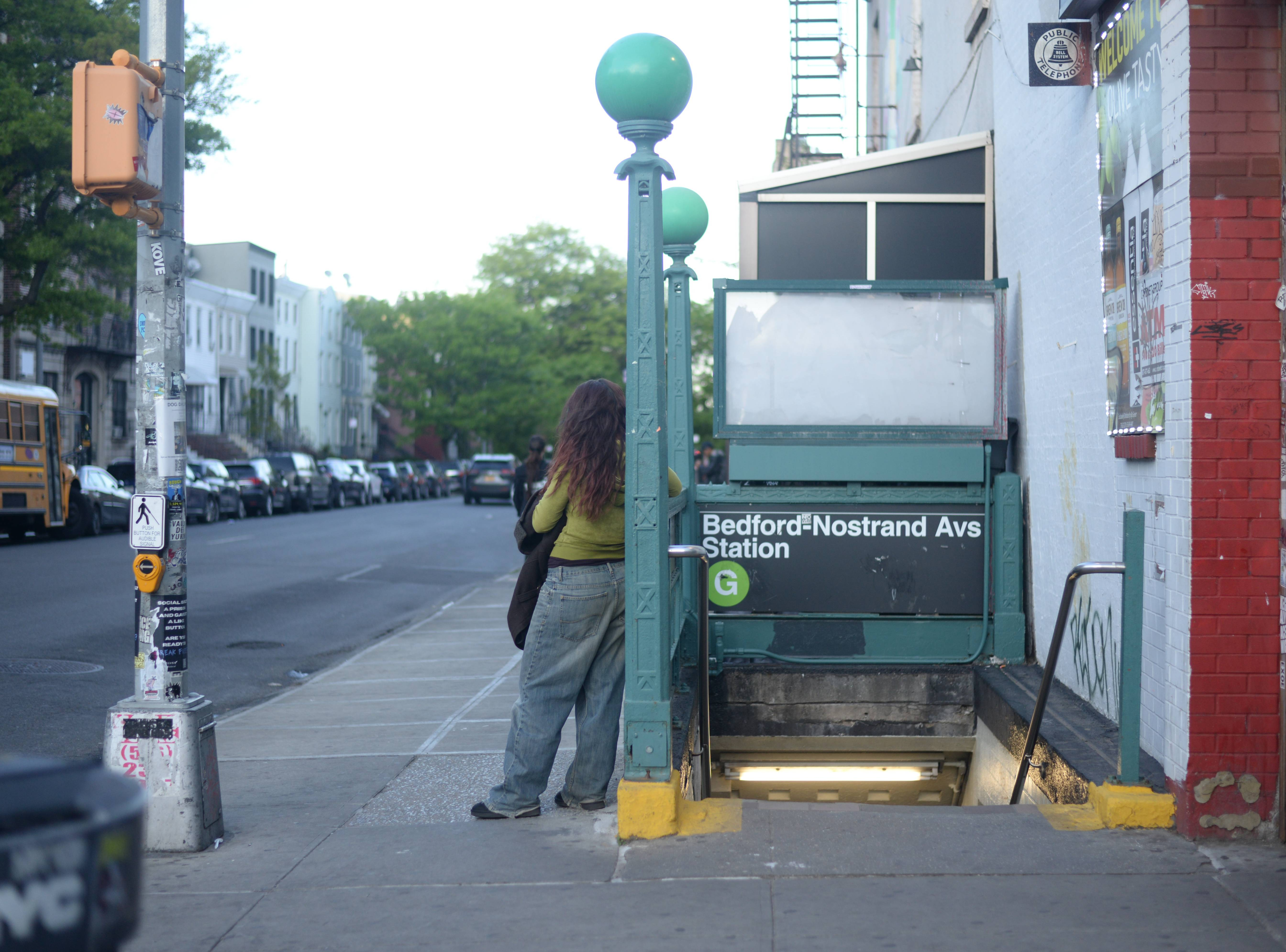
Station entrance on Bedford Avenue.

The middle track is used for storage of rush hour trains, or for maintenance and refuse trains. West (railroad south) of this station, the center track has switches to the two outer tracks before ending at a bumper block, while the trackway continues into Classon Avenue. East (railroad north) of the station, the middle track splits into two tracks that ramp down under the outer tracks before those tracks curve north. The tail tracks continue to Marcy Avenue and end at bumper blocks. A signal and switch tower is located in the tunnel north of the station, staffed during rush hour and midday service, but primarily used during construction reroutes if trains need to be terminated at the station.

Unused in regular service, the middle and tail tracks were originally intended for an unbuilt extension proposed in the IND Second System. Not part of the first official plan in 1929, it was proposed by the city Board of Transportation on October 12, 1930 as an addition to the original plans. The plan was for a line to continue east along Lafayette Avenue to Broadway (at Kosciuszko Street of the BMT Jamaica Line), then northeast along Stanhope Street to a junction with the BMT Myrtle Avenue Line and a planned IND Myrtle-Central Avenues Line along Myrtle Avenue (between the Central Avenue and Knickerbocker Avenue stations). The IND would then run east along Myrtle Avenue past the Myrtle El, then along Central Avenue in Queens (distinct from the Central Avenue in Brooklyn) to 73rd Place and Cooper Avenue in Glendale, Queens, adjacent to the Long Island Rail Road's Montauk Branch. The line would have likely continued along or parallel to the Montauk and Rockaway Beach Branches of the LIRR to Rockaway Beach and Far Rockaway. Upon completion of the extension, the center track would have been used to terminate short-run trains, or to provide an additional track to hold trains during peak hours.

Following the construction of the subway, Banneker Playground was created atop the line's curve from Lafayette Avenue onto Marcy Avenue.
