= Kosciuszko Street station =

New York City Subway station in Brooklyn

Kosciuszko Street
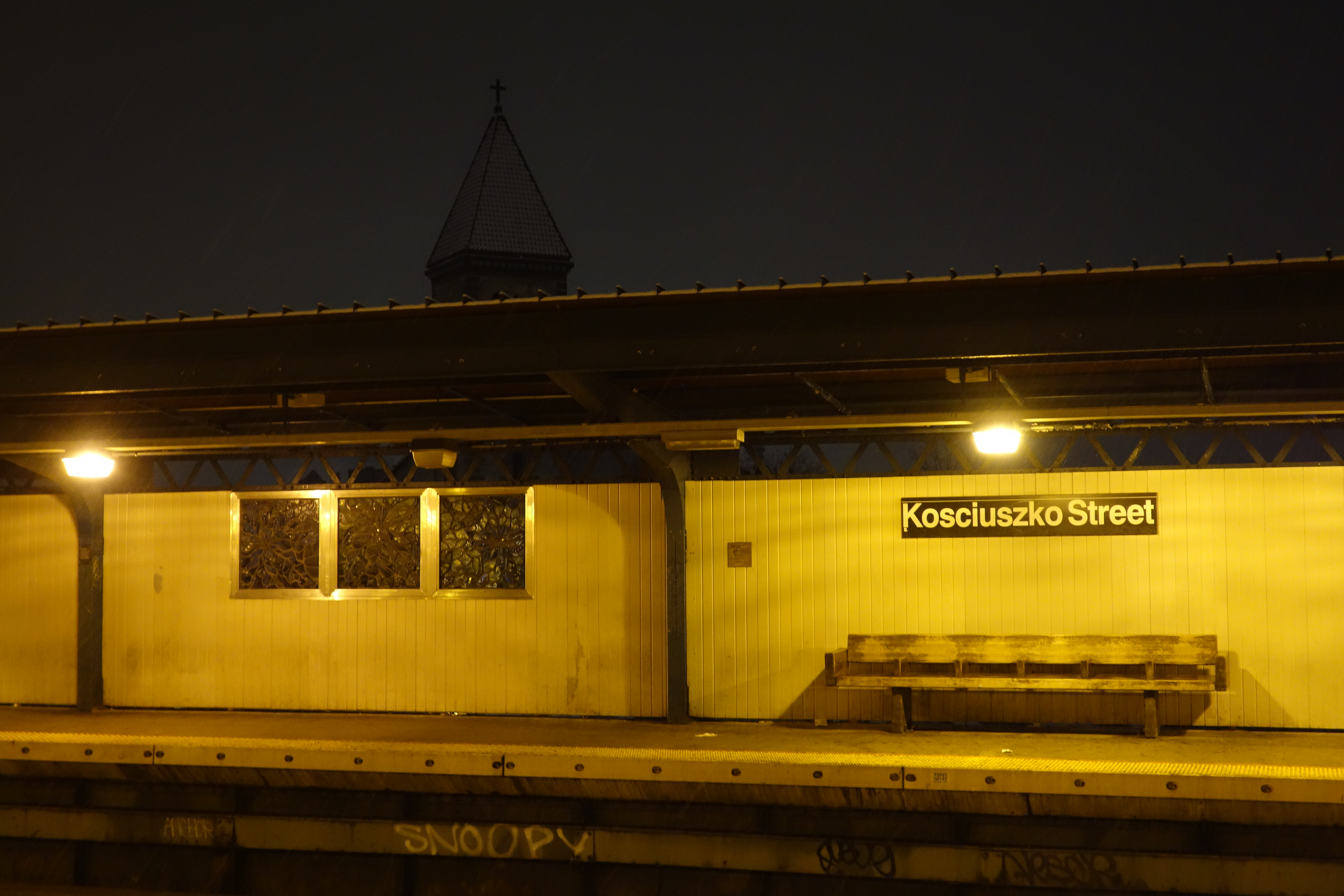
- View of northbound platform from across tracks

Station statistics
- Address: Kosciuszko Street and Broadway; Brooklyn, New York
- Borough: Brooklyn
- Locale: Bedford–Stuyvesant, Bushwick
- Coordinates: 40.6933°N 73.9287°W
- Division: B (BMT)
- Line: BMT Jamaica Line
- Services: J (all times)
- Transit: NYCT Bus: B38, B46, B46 SBS, B47, Q24
- Structure: Elevated
- Platforms: 2 side platforms
- Tracks: 3 (2 in regular service)

Other information
- Opened: June 25, 1888; 138 years ago

Traffic
- 2025: 1,415,047 ▲8.6%
- Rank: 238 out of 423
Services
Preceding station	New York City Subway	Following station
Myrtle Avenue J toward Broad Street	J/Z (New York City Subway service)	Halsey Street J skip-stop
Myrtle Avenue J toward Broad Street	J/Z (New York City Subway service)	Gates Avenue J toward Jamaica Center–York College
does not stop here
Location
Location within New York City Subway
Location within New York City
Location within New York
Track layout
Street map
Station service legend
Symbol	Description
Stops all times except rush hours in the peak direction	Stops all times except rush hours in the peak direction
Stops rush hours in the peak direction only	Stops rush hours in the peak direction only
Stops all times	Stops all times
Stops all times except late nights	Stops all times except late nights

The Kosciuszko Street station is a local station on the BMT Jamaica Line of the New York City Subway. It is served by the J train at all times. The Z train skips this station when it operates.

== Station layout ==
This elevated station has two side platforms and three tracks; the center express track is not used in regular service.

The artwork here is called Euphorbias by Ronald Calloway and has a floral theme.

=== Exits ===
Eastern stair entrance

The station has exits on both the west (railroad north) end and the east (railroad south) end of its platforms.

On the east end, each platform has a single staircase leading to an elevated station house beneath the tracks. It has a turnstile bank and token booth. Outside fare control, two staircases lead to both western corners of Kossuth Place, Patchen Avenue, Lafayette Avenue, and Broadway, just east of Kosciuszko Street.

The western exits are now emergency exits leading to both eastern corners of DeKalb Avenue and Broadway. These exits were closed in the 1980s due to high crime. The closed entrance is about a block from the northern terminus of the B46 Select Bus Service at DeKalb Avenue. There is a closed station house around the intermediate level of the staircases.
