= Bedford Avenue =

Avenue in Brooklyn, New York

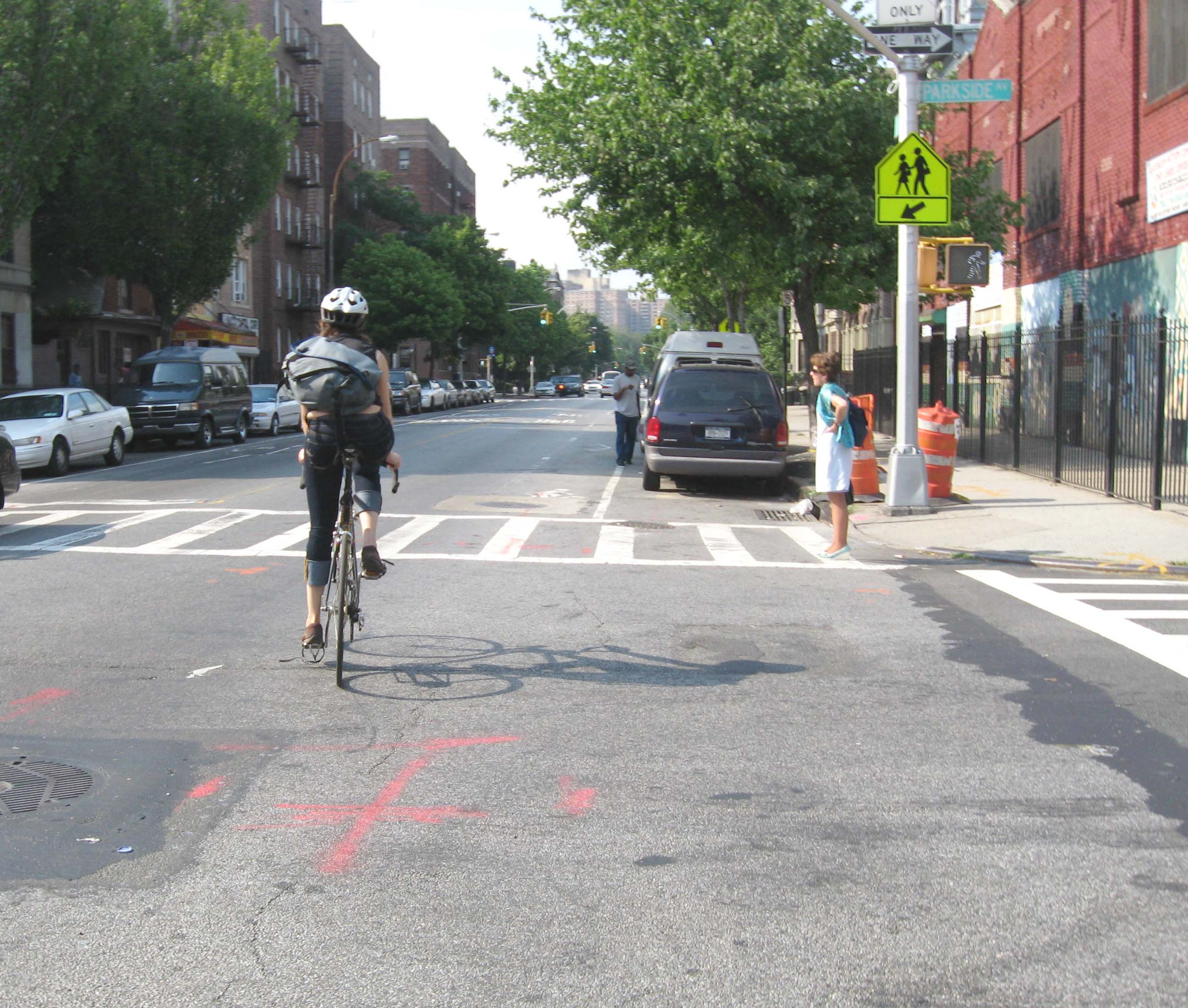
- Crossing Parkside Avenue in northern Flatbush
- Interactive map of Bedford Avenue
- Owner: City of New York
- Maintained by: NYCDOT
- Length: 10.2 mi (16.4 km)
- Location: Brooklyn, New York City
- South end: Emmons Avenue in Sheepshead Bay
- Major junctions: NY 27 in Prospect Lefferts Gardens; Eastern Parkway in Crown Heights
- North end: Manhattan Avenue in Greenpoint
- East: East 26th Street (South Brooklyn); Spencer Street (Bedford–Stuyvesant); Driggs Avenue (Williamsburg)
- West: East 24th Street (South Brooklyn); Skillman Street (Bedford–Stuyvesant); Berry Street (Williamsburg)

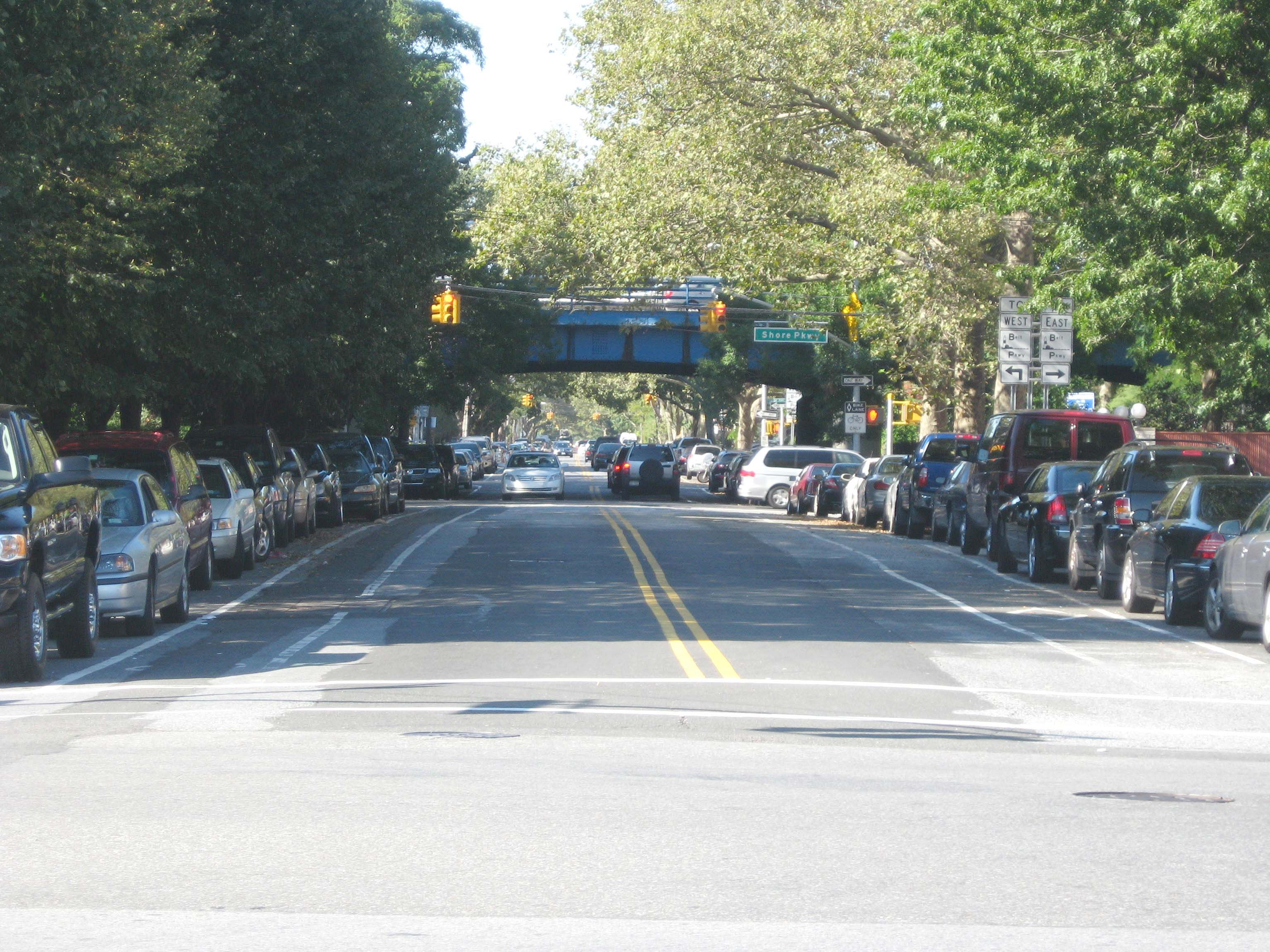
South end at Sheepshead Bay

Bedford Avenue is the longest street in Brooklyn, New York City, stretching 10.2 miles (16.4 km) and 132 blocks, from Manhattan Avenue in Greenpoint south to Emmons Avenue in Sheepshead Bay, and passing through the neighborhoods of Williamsburg, Bedford–Stuyvesant, Crown Heights, Flatbush, Midwood, Marine Park, and Sheepshead Bay.

== History ==
Bedford Road, passing through Bedford Pass, was an important north-south route in the 18th century for traffic between the farming village of Flatbush and the headwaters of Newtown Creek. In the 19th century, it was extended south to the shore, and late in the century, it became one of the earliest paved roads in the rapidly growing eastern suburbs of the City of Brooklyn.

Bedford Avenue is an amalgam of various historical roads. For example, in Williamsburg, Bedford Avenue was known as Fourth Street in the late 1800s.

== Transportation ==
Automobile traffic flows in two directions: south of Grant Square, at Dean Street; and one-way northbound north of that location. The northernmost block of Bedford Avenue, between the intersections of Lorimer Street/Nassau Avenue and Manhattan Avenue in Greenpoint, was formerly bi-directional. In July 2018, this block was made one-way eastbound, with all traffic on northbound Bedford Avenue being forced to turn onto eastbound Nassau Avenue, at the Lorimer Street intersection.

Northbound and southbound bicycle lanes are painted on the avenue south of Grant Square. The bike lanes were first installed in 2007. Hasidic Jewish residents in Williamsburg successfully advocated for the removal of a 14-block stretch of the lane in 2009, citing safety concerns; the move was controversial, and cyclists attempted to repaint an unofficial lane on the avenue after it was removed. A northbound protected bike lane from Dean Street to Flushing Avenue in Bedford–Stuyvesant was added in 2024, but part of the lane was removed the next year due to complaints about frequent crashes.

=== Public transportation ===
Bedford Avenue has the following New York City Subway stations:

- The Bedford Avenue (L train) station is located at Bedford Avenue and North 7th Street in Williamsburg.
- The Bedford–Nostrand Avenues (G train) station is located at Bedford and Lafayette Avenues in Bedford-Stuyvesant.
- The Nostrand Avenue station (A and C trains) has entrances on Bedford Avenue.

Bus service on Bedford Avenue is provided by the following:

- Northbound, the B44 SBS runs on the avenue from Dean Street to Taylor Street, and is joined by the B44 local from Fulton Street to Flushing Avenue. Every other SBS trip terminates at Flushing, and local service is extended to Taylor when SBS isn’t running.
- From Dean Street, northbound B49 service runs on the avenue to its northern terminal at Fulton Street, while southbound service goes to Foster Avenue.
- The B6 and B11 run between Glenwood Road and Avenue J.
- Long Island City-bound B62 buses run from Broadway to Lorimer Street.

== Buildings ==
The many different building types common in Brooklyn are evident at some point on the avenue, from attached and detached single-family houses in Sheepshead Bay and Midwood, to brownstone rowhouses in Crown Heights and Bedford-Stuyvesant and apartment buildings in Williamsburg and Greenpoint. In addition, the avenue passes through neighborhoods representative of Brooklyn's cultural and ethnic diversity. African-American, Caribbean, West African, Hasidic, Latin American, Russian, and Polish neighborhoods are all found along the avenue.

Designated landmarks include the Studebaker Building and the 23rd Regiment Armory.
