= Classon Avenue station =

New York City Subway station in Brooklyn

Classon Avenue
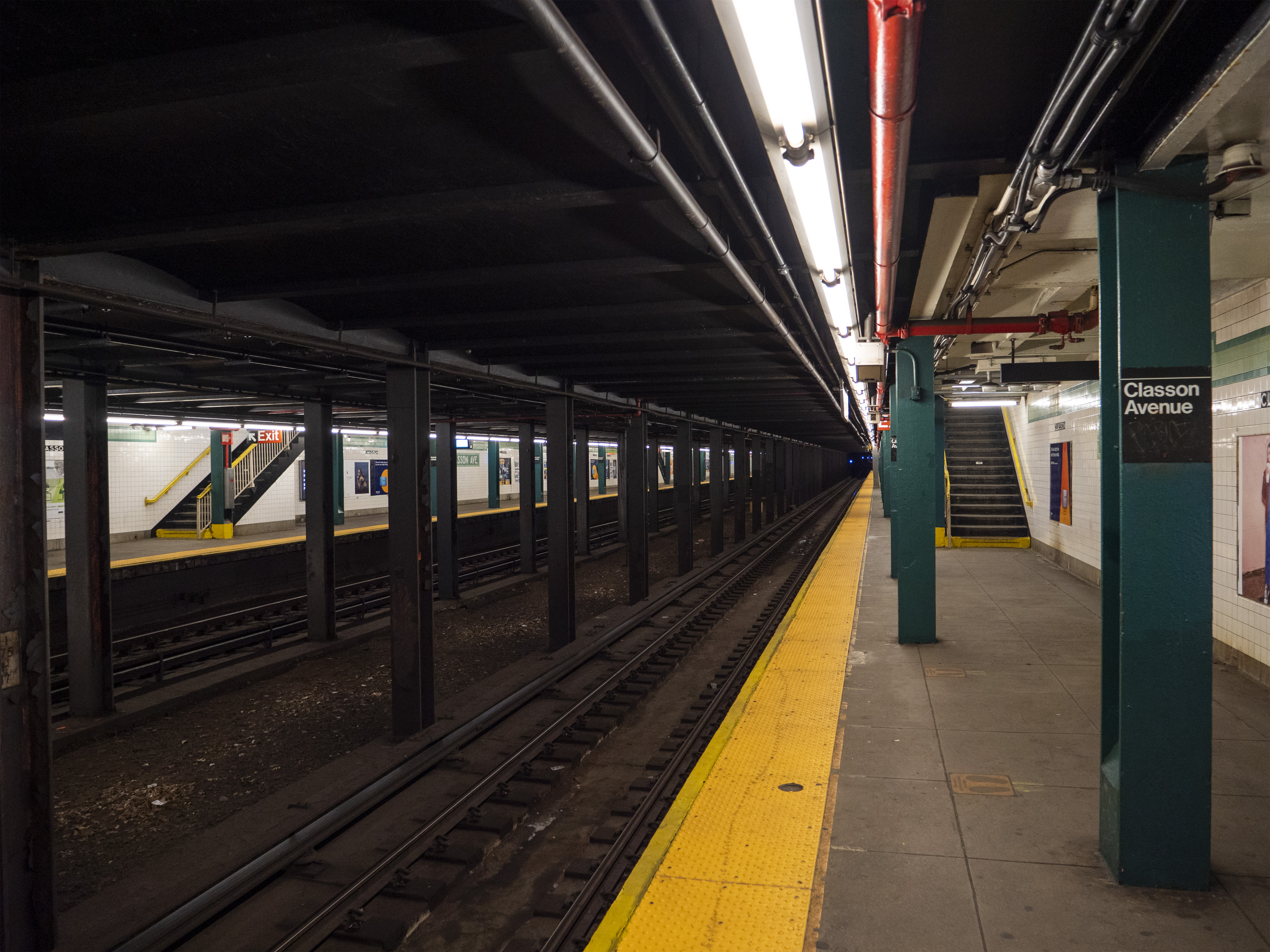
- View from southbound platform

Station statistics
- Address: Classon Avenue & Lafayette Avenue; Brooklyn, New York
- Borough: Brooklyn
- Locale: Bedford–Stuyvesant, Clinton Hill
- Coordinates: 40.688839°N 73.960047°W
- Division: B (IND)
- Line: IND Crosstown Line
- Services: G (all times)
- Transit: NYCT Bus: B38, B48
- Structure: Underground
- Platforms: 2 side platforms
- Tracks: 2

Other information
- Opened: July 1, 1937; 89 years ago
- Accessible: No; under construction

Traffic
- 2025: 1,328,361 ▲10.5%
- Rank: 252 out of 423
Services
Preceding station	New York City Subway	Following station
Bedford–Nostrand Avenues toward Court Square	G (New York City Subway service)	Clinton–Washington Avenues toward Church Avenue
Location
Location within New York City Subway
Location within New York City
Location within New York
Track layout
Street map
Station service legend
Symbol	Description
Stops all times	Stops all times

The Classon Avenue station (locally /ˈklɔːsɪn/ KLAW-sin) is a station on the IND Crosstown Line of the New York City Subway. Located at the intersection of Classon and Lafayette Avenues on the border of Bedford–Stuyvesant and Clinton Hill, Brooklyn, it is served at all times by the G train.

== History ==
This station opened on July 1, 1937, when the entire Crosstown Line was completed between Nassau Avenue and its connection to the IND Culver Line. At the time, the GG service ran between Smith–Ninth Streets and Forest Hills–71st Avenue.

Under the 2015–2019 Metropolitan Transportation Authority Capital Plan, this station, along with 32 others, was planned to have undergone a complete overhaul as part of the Enhanced Station Initiative. Updates would have included cellular service, Wi-Fi, USB charging stations, interactive service advisories and maps, and improved signage and station lighting.

However, most of these renovations were deferred until the 2020–2024 Capital Program due to a lack of funding. In 2019, the MTA announced that this station would become ADA-accessible as part of the agency's 2020–2024 Capital Program.

A request for proposals was put out on May 18, 2023 for the contract for a project bundle to make 13 stations accessible, including Classon Avenue. The contract to add three elevators at the station was awarded in December 2023. Work on the elevators began in August 2024, after U.S. Senator Chuck Schumer and U.S. Representative Hakeem Jeffries provided $900 million to the MTA for elevators at 13 stations, including Classon Avenue. In addition to three elevators, the project will include the construction of four additional turnstiles and seven staircases.

== Station layout ==
This underground station has two side platforms and two tracks with space for a center track. The G stops at the station at all times. The station is between Bedford–Nostrand Avenues to the north and Clinton–Washington Avenues to the south.

Both platforms have a light green trim line with a dark green border and name tablets reading "CLASSON AVE." in white sans-serif lettering on a dark green background and light green border. Small "CLASSON" tile captions and directional signs in white lettering on a black background run below the trim line and name tablets. The tiles were part of a color-coded tile system used throughout the IND. The tile colors were designed to facilitate navigation for travelers going away from Lower Manhattan. Because the Crosstown Line does not merge into a line that enters Manhattan at either end, all stations on the line had green tiles. Hunter green (previously dark blue) I-beam columns run along both platforms at regular intervals with alternating ones having the standard black station name plate in white lettering.

The space for an additional center track between the two outer ones was meant for the unbuilt IND Second System. It would have been an extension of the center track at Bedford–Nostrand Avenues, which dead-ends on either side of that station. Railroad south of Classon Avenue, the two tracks curve closer to each other and the center trackway ends.

The south end of the southbound platform and the north end of the northbound one have room for proposed control towers. Those spaces are now used for crew facilities.

=== Exits ===
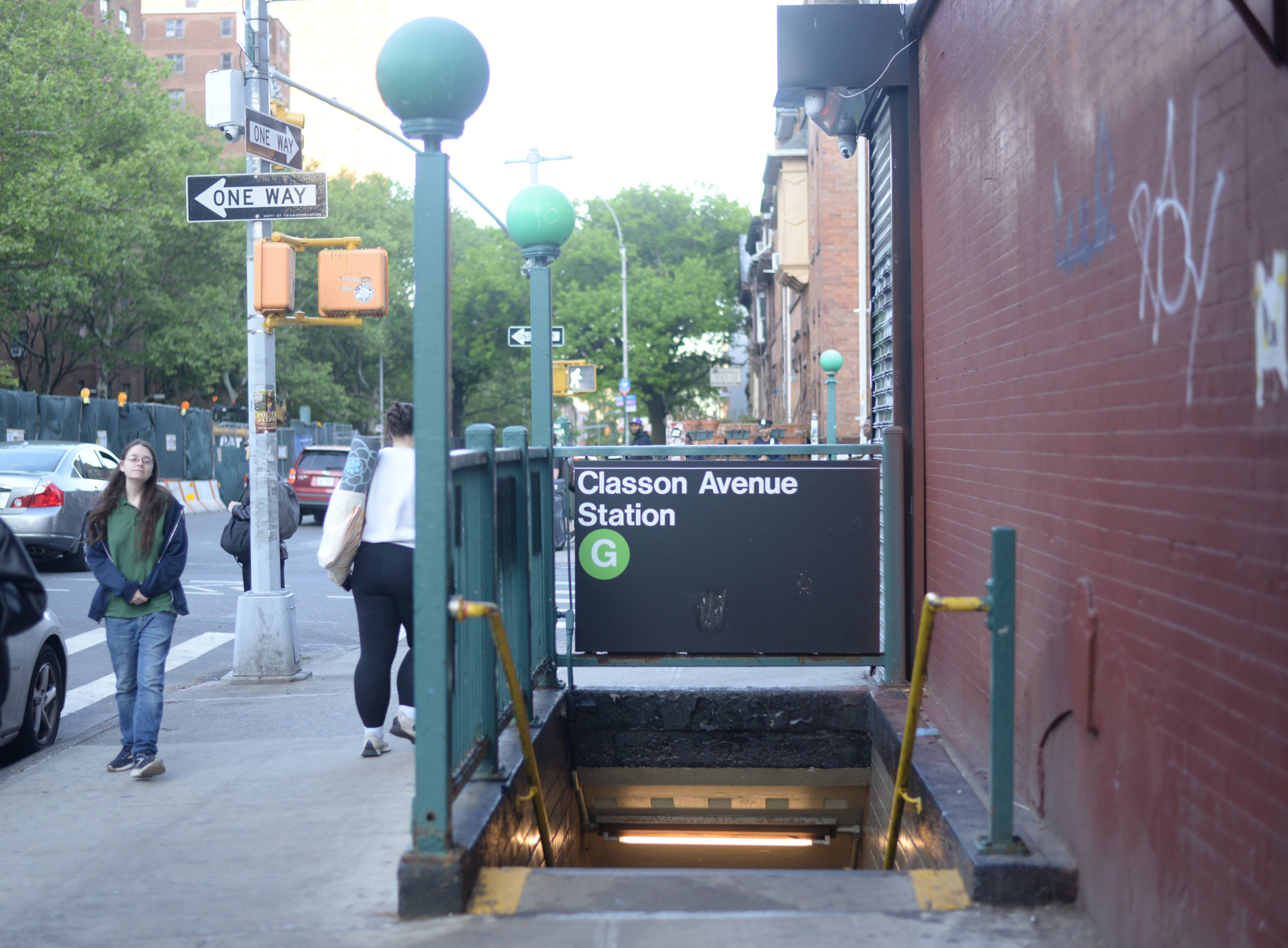
Entrance at the southwest corner of Classon and Lafayette Avenue.

This station has a full length mezzanine above the platforms and tracks supported by dark green I-beam columns. The mezzanine is split by a fare control area at the center with a turnstile bank, token booth, and three stairs going up to all corners of Classon and Lafayette Avenues except the northeast one. Currently, only the northern half is open to the public and has two staircases to each platform. The southern half is closed, but is planned to be partly reopened as part of ADA accessibility work at the station; it will have one staircase to each platform.
