= Clinton–Washington Avenues station (IND Crosstown Line) =

New York City Subway station in Brooklyn

Clinton–Washington Avenues
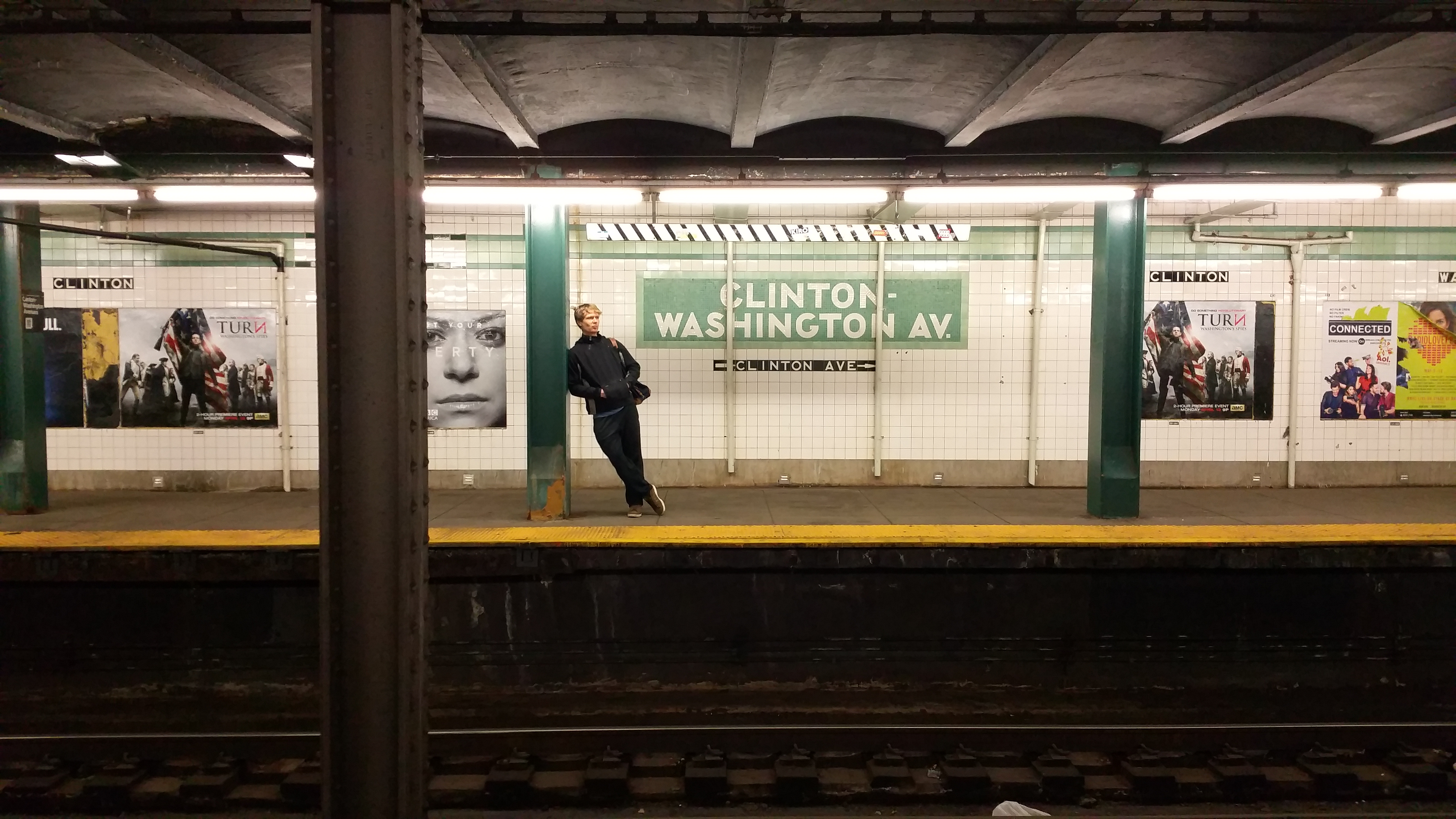

Station statistics
- Address: Lafayette Avenue between Clinton Avenue & Washington Avenue; Brooklyn, New York
- Borough: Brooklyn
- Locale: Clinton Hill
- Coordinates: 40.688058°N 73.96687°W
- Division: B (IND)
- Line: IND Crosstown Line
- Services: G (all times)
- Transit: NYCT Bus: B38, B69
- Structure: Underground
- Platforms: 2 side platforms
- Tracks: 2

Other information
- Opened: July 1, 1937; 89 years ago

Traffic
- 2025: 1,411,117 ▲20.7%
- Rank: 239 out of 423
Services
Preceding station	New York City Subway	Following station
Classon Avenue toward Court Square	G (New York City Subway service)	Fulton Street toward Church Avenue
Location
Location within New York City Subway
Location within New York City
Location within New York
Track layout
Street map
Station service legend
Symbol	Description
Stops all times	Stops all times

The Clinton–Washington Avenues station is a station on the IND Crosstown Line of the New York City Subway. Located at Lafayette Avenue between Clinton and Washington Avenues in Clinton Hill, Brooklyn, it is served by the G train at all times.

== History ==
This station opened on July 1, 1937, when the entire Crosstown Line was completed between Nassau Avenue and its connection to the IND Culver Line. On this date, the GG was extended in both directions to Smith–Ninth Streets and Forest Hills–71st Avenue.

== Station layout ==
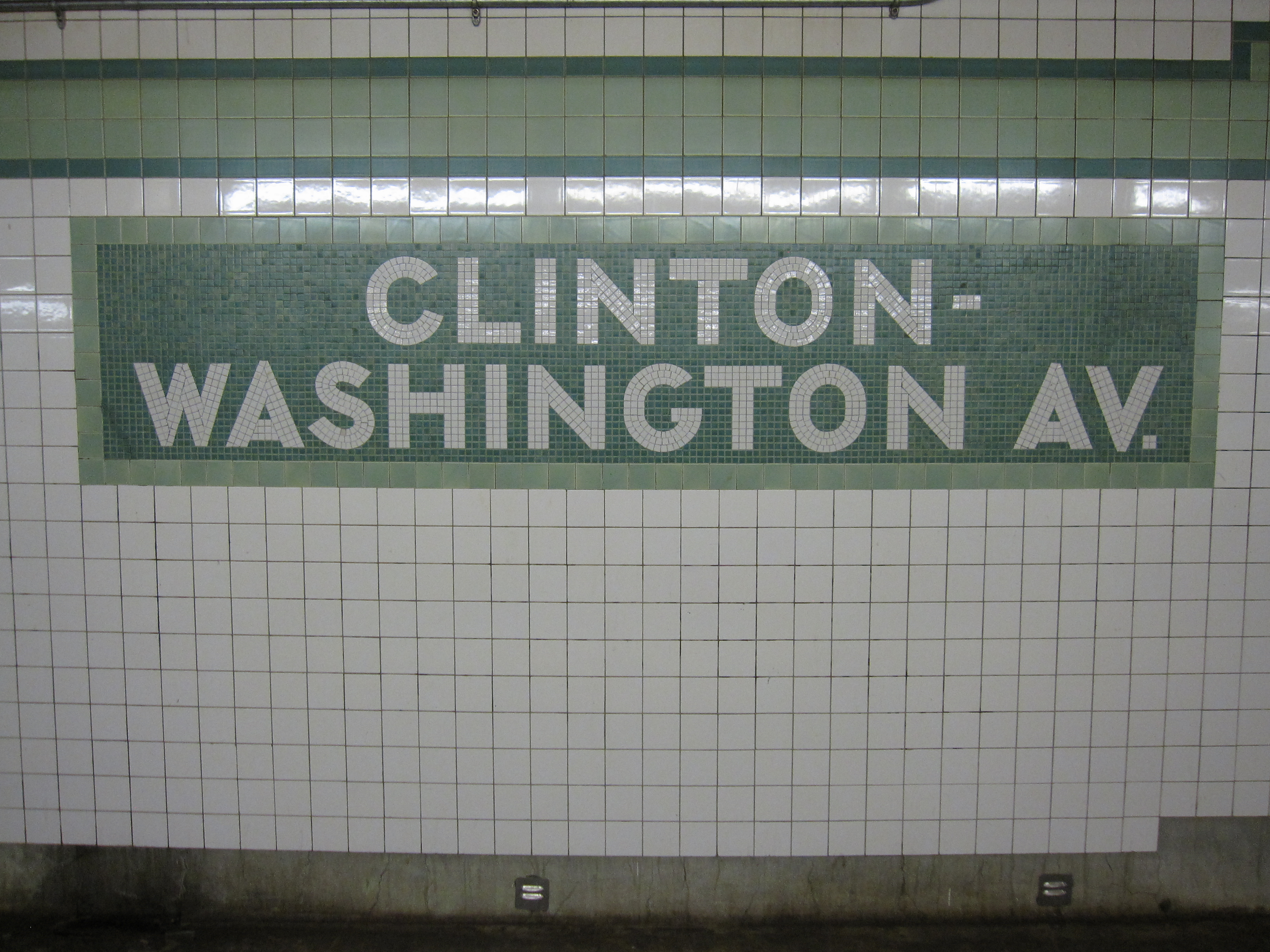
Mosaic name tablet

This underground station has two tracks and two side platforms. The G stops at the station at all times. The station is between Classon Avenue to the north and Fulton Street to the south.

Both platforms have a light green trim line with a dark green border and mosaic name tablets reading "CLINTON - WASHINGTON AV." on two lines in white sans-serif lettering on a dark green background and a lighter green border. Beneath the trim line and name tablets are small tile directional signs and station names (alternating between "CLINTON" and "WASHINGTON") in white lettering on a black background. The tiles were part of a color-coded tile system used throughout the IND. The tile colors were designed to facilitate navigation for travelers going away from Lower Manhattan. Because the Crosstown Line does not merge into a line that enters Manhattan at either end, all stations on the line had green tiles. Hunter green (previously yellow) I-beam columns run along both platforms at regular intervals, alternating ones having the standard black station name plate in white lettering.

The mezzanine has five murals of artwork, each of different names and artists. They are Night and Day by Jim Porter installed in 1998, Safe Passage by Dan Simmons, an untitled artwork by Maku, Fusion by Jamal Ince installed in 2000, and Mercury by John Woodrow Kelley installed in 2000.

=== Exits ===
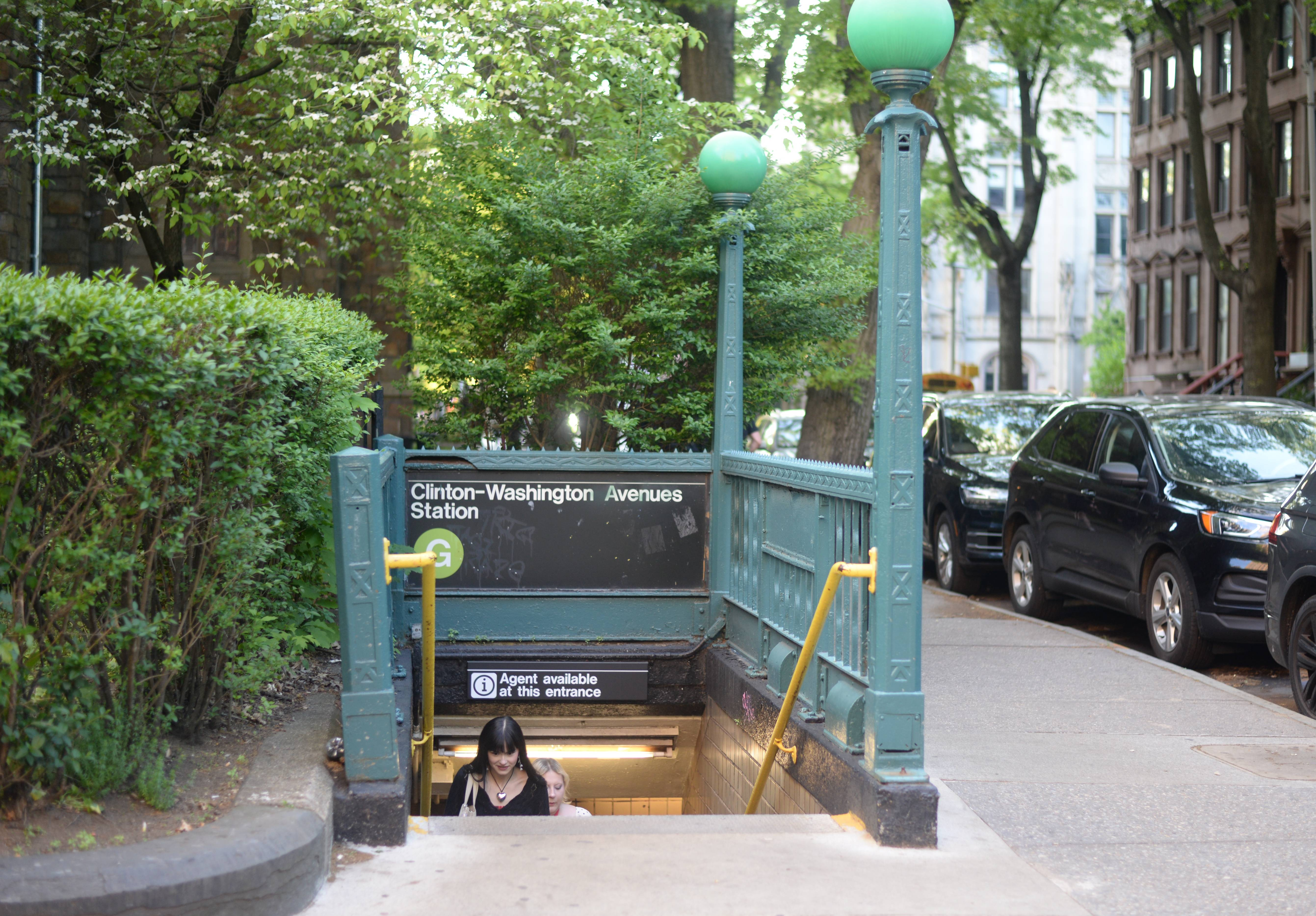
Entrance at the southwest corner of Clinton and Lafayette Avenues.

This station has a full length mezzanine above the platforms and tracks supported by yellow I-beam columns. The center of the mezzanine is outside fare control and has a token booth and two street stairs at each end. The ones on the west (railroad south) go up to the northeast and southwest corners of Clinton and Lafayette Avenues while the ones on the east (railroad north) end go up to either eastern corners of Washington and Lafayette Avenues. The center of the mezzanine also has a bank of turnstiles, two exit-only turnstiles, and two staircases going down to each platform.

At either end of the mezzanine are unstaffed entrances/exits containing two exit-only turnstiles, one high entry/exit turnstile, and one staircase to each platform. Both of these fare control areas have a crossover that allow a free transfer between directions. A short staircase is required to reach the center mezzanine from the Clinton Avenue fare control area due to a higher ceiling.

== Nearby points of interest ==
- Pratt Institute
- Adelphi University
- Saint Joseph College
- Bishop Loughlin High School
