= B38 (New York City bus) =

Bus route in Brooklyn, New York

b38 b38
- DeKalb Avenue Line
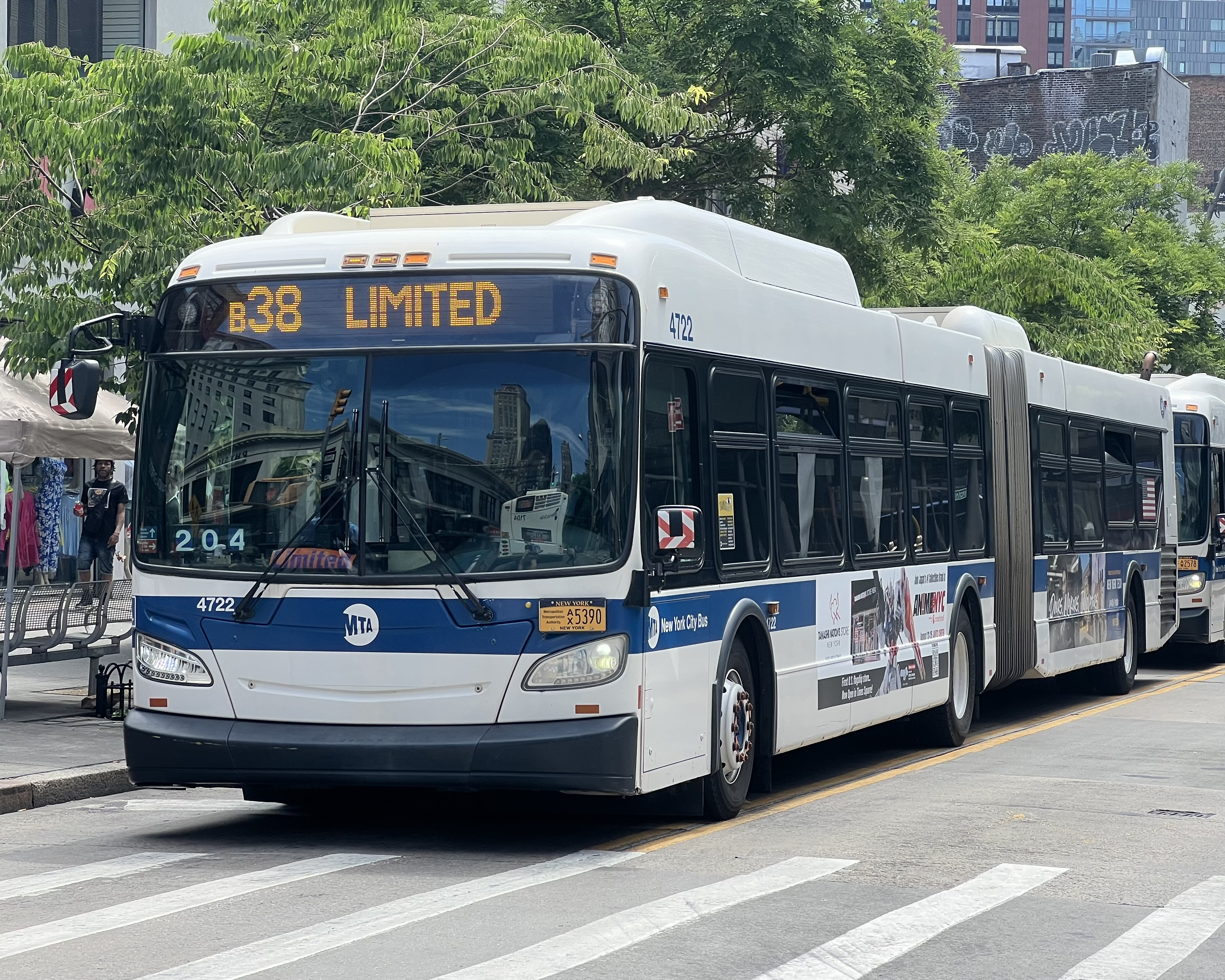
- A 2012 XD60 (4722) on the Downtown Brooklyn-bound B38 Limited along Fulton Street in June 2024.

Overview
- System: MTA Regional Bus Operations
- Operator: New York City Transit Authority
- Garage: Grand Avenue Depot
- Vehicle: New Flyer Xcelsior XD60 (main vehicle); New Flyer Xcelsior XD40; New Flyer Xcelsior XDE40; New Flyer Xcelsior XE40(supplemental)

Route
- Locale: Brooklyn and Queens, New York, U.S.
- Communities served: Ridgewood, Bushwick, Bedford–Stuyvesant, Clinton Hill, Fort Greene, Downtown Brooklyn
- Start: Downtown Brooklyn–Cadman Plaza & Tillary Street
- Via: Lafayette Avenue (eastbound) / DeKalb Avenue (westbound)
- End: Ridgewood, Queens
- Length: 5.9 miles (9.5 km)
- Other routes: B26 Halsey/Fulton Streets; B52 Gates Avenue; B54 Myrtle Avenue

Service
- Operates: All times (Seneca/Catalpa), All times except late nights (Metropolitan/Starr)
- Annual patronage: 3,382,577 (2025)
- Transfers: Yes
- Timetable: B38

The DeKalb Avenue Line is a public transit line in Brooklyn and Queens, New York City, running mostly along DeKalb Avenue, as well as eastbound on Lafayette Avenue (as part of a one-way pair), between Downtown Brooklyn and Ridgewood, Queens. Originally a streetcar line, it is now the B38 DeKalb/Lafayette Avenues bus route, operated by the New York City Transit Authority. It has a daily ridership of 18,000.

At its east end, after crossing into Queens, the line turns southeast on Seneca Avenue and ends just short of Myrtle Avenue, at Catalpa Avenue. A branch runs northeast on Stanhope Street to Linden Hill Cemetery.

== Route description ==
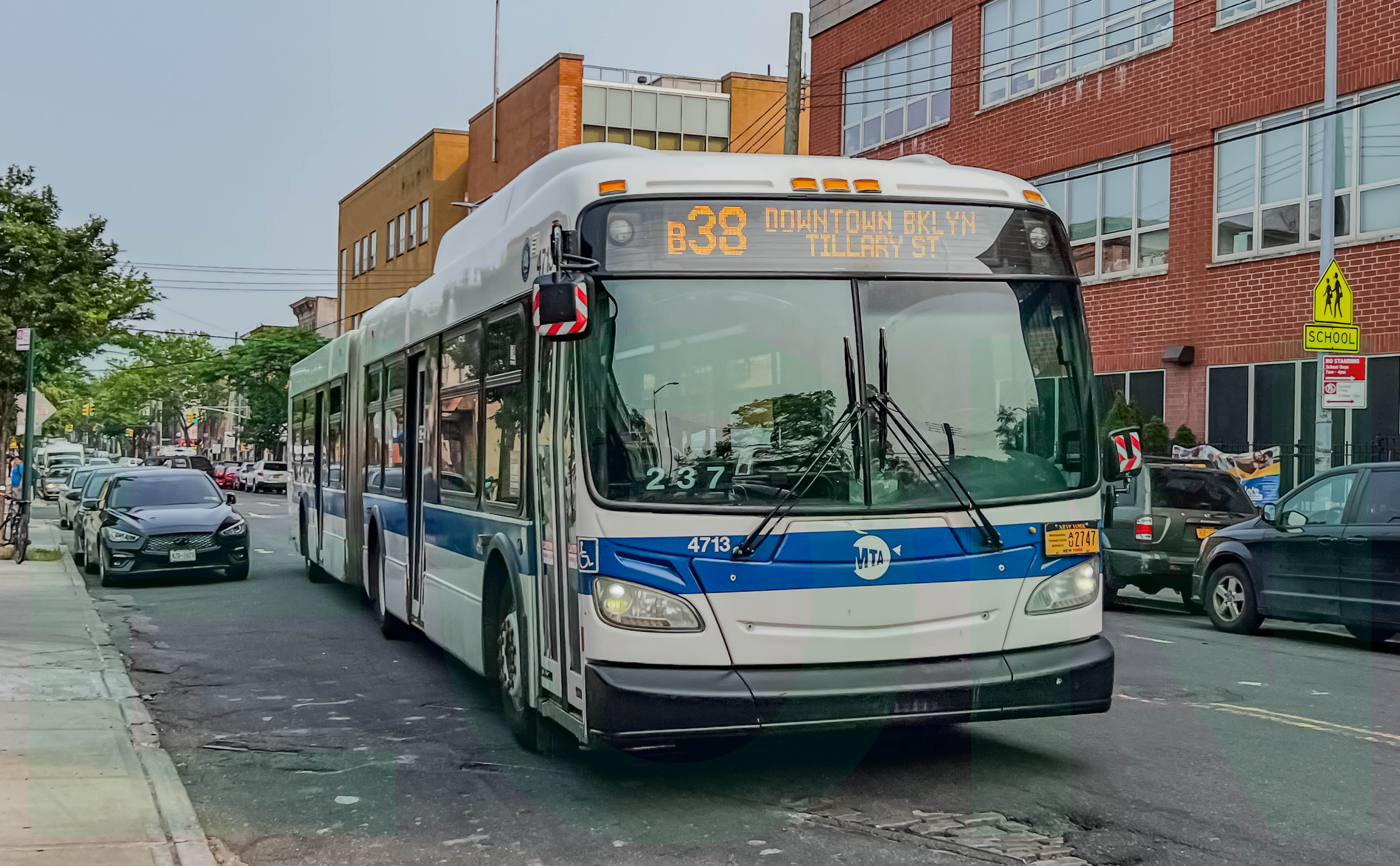
A 2012 XD60 (4713) on the Downtown Brooklyn-bound B38 in May 2023

The B38 bus route begins at a loop around Borough Hall in Downtown Brooklyn. It heads east on Fulton Street, splitting onto DeKalb Avenue (westbound) and Lafayette Avenue (eastbound). After crossing Broadway, eastbound buses return to DeKalb Avenue via Bushwick Avenue. The route crosses into Ridgewood, Queens and turns southeast on Seneca Avenue; every other bus turns northeast on Stanhope Street to a loop around Linden Hill Cemetery, while the rest continue along Seneca Avenue to just shy of Myrtle Avenue. Along the way, transfers can be made to the subway at Court Street – Borough Hall (2, 3, 4, 5, N, R, and W), Jay Street – MetroTech (A, C, and F and <F>), DeKalb Avenue (BMT Fourth Avenue and Brighton Lines) (B, D, N, Q, R, and W), Classon Avenue (G), Kosciuszko Street (J), DeKalb Avenue (BMT Canarsie Line) (L), and Seneca Avenue (M).

The B38 also employs a limited-stop service during the daytime on weekdays, making limited stops between Flatbush Avenue and Seneca Avenue. While the limited-stop service is running, B38 Limiteds serve Catalpa Avenue while local B38 buses serve the Linden Hill Cemetery. There is no overnight service to Linden Hill Cemetery.

== History ==
=== Streetcar service ===
After a legal battle with the Coney Island and Brooklyn Railroad (Smith Street Line), which shared Water Street west of Main Street, and in which it was decided that the CI&B would own two tracks and give the BC&N trackage rights over one, the Brooklyn City and Newtown Rail Road opened the line to the public on January 28, 1862. The route stretched from Fulton Ferry east to stables at Throop Avenue and a depot at Marcus Garvey Boulevard (then Yates Avenue, later Sumner Avenue). Tracks were laid in Fulton Street, Front Street, Gold Street, Willoughby Street, University Plaza (then Debevoise Street), and DeKalb Avenue. The eastbound track, in Water Street and Bridge Street rather than Front Street and Gold Street, was soon opened. By July, the line was extended northeast on DeKalb Avenue and southeast on Seneca Avenue to the Myrtle Avenue Park in Ridgewood, Queens.

In order to enable the company to avoid the narrow Debevoise Street and a dangerous westbound curve at Debevoise Street and DeKalb Avenue, a law was passed in 1869 to allow a single track in DeKalb Avenue and Gold Street between Debevoise Street and Willoughby Street. The company laid a single track plus a "siding", but used both for revenue service, rerouting all trains in both directions to the new route in August 1869. Eastbound trains were moved back to Willoughby Street and Debevoise Street once a single track was built to replace the two; by then, the Hunter's Point and Prospect Park Railroad (Crosstown Line) was also using Willoughby Street.

Starting on May 3, 1871, the Park Avenue Railroad's Vanderbilt Avenue Line shared the tracks between Fulton Ferry and Concord Street. In March 1872, a law was passed to allow the BC&N to build in DeKalb Avenue west from Debevoise Street to Fulton Street, and use the Brooklyn City Rail Road's trackage in Fulton Street to Fulton Ferry. After some opposition from the City Railroad, the route was changed in April to turn off on Washington Street after passing City Hall. Despite objections from Washington Street residents, the new route, using Washington Street north to Front and Water Streets, was opened on September 4, 1872. The old route continued to be used by short-turn trains to Yates Avenue. The BC&N stopped using the old route later that decade, but the Vanderbilt Avenue Line continued to use it until 1883, when it built a track in Concord Street west of Bridge Street in order to serve the new Brooklyn Bridge.

The Coney Island and Brooklyn Railroad leased BC&N on December 1, 1897 and this became an important CI&B branchline. The DeKalb Avenue and North Beach Railroad (also leased to the Coney Island and Brooklyn) built the branch on Stanhope Street. Buses were substituted for streetcars on January 30, 1949.

=== Bus service ===
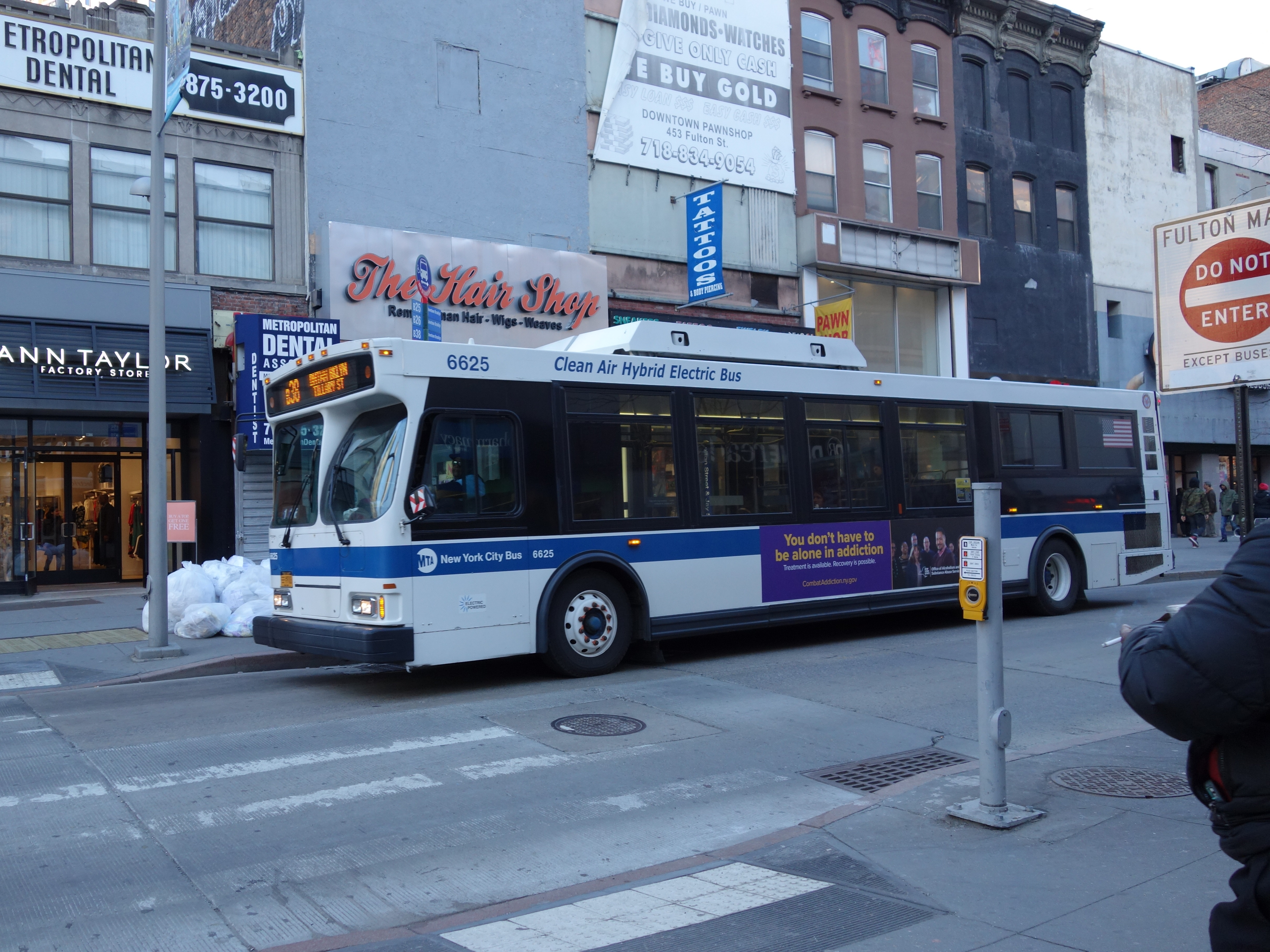
A 2005 Orion VII OG HEV (6625) on the B38 on Smith Street at Fulton Mall

Prior to January 2019, the B38 local was based out of the Grand Avenue Depot while the B38 Limited was based out of the Fresh Pond Depot. On weekends, buses from both depots were utilized on the local route. On January 6, 2019, the B38 became fully assigned to the Grand Avenue Depot since the route was planned to be converted to using articulated buses, which was announced by the MTA in July 2019. Consistent with the conversions of other bus routes, the frequency of service was decreased by 1 to 3 minutes on weekdays, and by 2 to 3 minutes on weekends, as each articulated bus can fit 115 passengers, compared to the 85 riders that can fit onto a standard 40 feet (12 m)-long bus. In order to accommodate the longer articulated bus stops, four bus stops in Brooklyn and five stops along Seneca Avenue in Queens were discontinued during the week of August 12–16, 2019. In addition, 14 bus stops were adjusted. The route started using articulated buses on September 1, 2019.

On December 1, 2022, the MTA released a draft redesign of the Brooklyn bus network. As part of the redesign, all B38 buses would operate to Catalpa Avenue at all times, and the Metropolitan Avenue/Linden Hill Cemetery branch would be discontinued. Closely-spaced stops would be removed. The B38 Limited would also be discontinued because the increased stop spacing would make it redundant. In 2026, the city government announced plans to add bus lanes to Lafayette and DeKalb Avenues to speed up B38 buses.

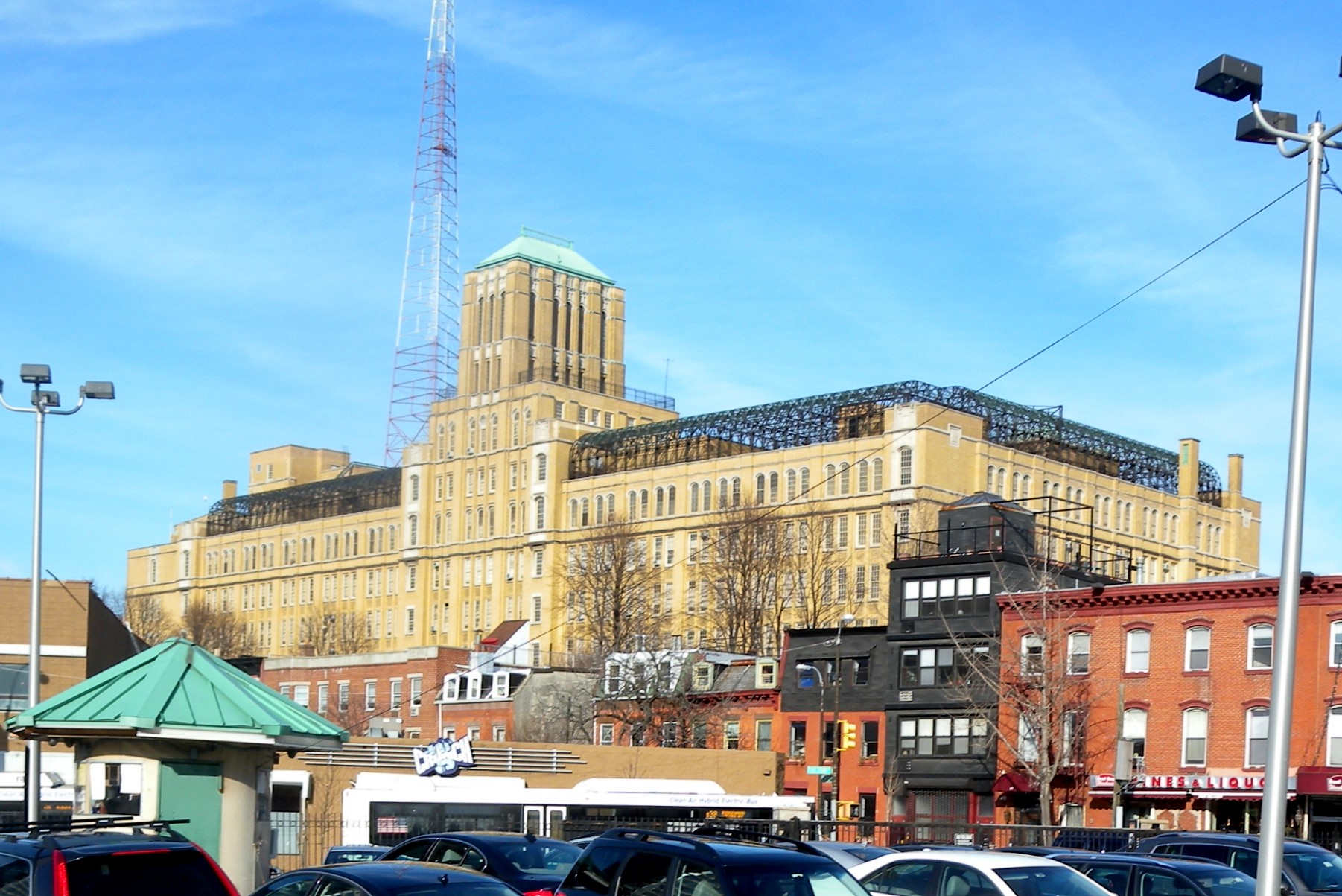
An Orion VII NG HEV on the Metropolitan Avenue-bound B38 local near Brooklyn Tech, as seen from Ashland Place in Fort Greene

== Connecting bus routes ==
- B25, B26, B41, B52, B103 (at Tillary Street)
- B45, B65 (at Joralemon/Fulton Streets)
- B57, B62, B67 (at Jay Street)
- B69 (at Vanderbilt Avenue)
- B48 (at Classon/Franklin Avenues)
- B44, B44 SBS (at Bedford/Nostrand Avenues)
- B43 (at Tompkins/Throop Avenues)
- B15 (at Marcus Garvey Boulevard/Lewis Avenue)
- B46, B46 SBS (at Malcolm X Boulevard)
- B47, Q24 (at Broadway)
- B54 (at Myrtle Avenue, Brooklyn)
- B60 (at Wilson Avenue)
- B13 (at Wyckoff Avenue)
- Q54 (at Metropolitan Avenue; Stanhope only)
- Q55, Q58, Q98 (at Myrtle Avenue, Queens; Seneca only)
