= List of streetcar lines in Queens =

The following streetcar lines once operated in Queens, New York City, United States.

== BMT ==
The Brooklyn-Manhattan Transit Corporation concentrated on Brooklyn, but had some lines into Queens. Only the ones that significantly entered Queens are shown here; see list of streetcar lines in Brooklyn for the others (mainly into Ridgewood).

Name	From	To	Route	Notes
Metropolitan Avenue Line	Brooklyn	Jamaica	Metropolitan Avenue	built by the Broadway Ferry and Metropolitan Avenue Railroad in 1867 abandoned June 12, 1949 now the Q54 bus
Richmond Hill Line	Brooklyn	Jamaica	Myrtle Avenue	established in the late 1890s abandoned April 26, 1950 now the Q55 bus
Jamaica Line	Brooklyn	Jamaica	Jamaica Avenue	opened by the East New York and Jamaica Railroad on May 7, 1863 abandoned November 30, 1947 now the Q56 bus
Flushing Avenue Line	Brooklyn	Maspeth	Flushing Avenue	abandoned November 21, 1948 now the B57 bus
Flushing–Ridgewood Line	Ridgewood	Flushing	Fresh Pond Road, Grand Avenue, and Corona Avenue	established on November 1899 and abandoned July 17, 1949 now the Q58 bus
Grand Street Line	Brooklyn	Elmhurst	Grand Avenue	built by the Grand Street and Newtown Railroad in 1876 abandoned December 11, 1949 now the Q59 bus
North Beach Line	Corona	North Beach	Junction Boulevard	established 1895 abandoned August 25, 1949 now the Q72 bus
Cypress Hills Cemetery Line	Ridgewood	Cypress Hills Cemetery	Cypress Avenue	opened by the Bushwick Railroad as the Bushwick Avenue Line on May 26, 1878, then split on May 1, 1946. abandoned September 1, 1947, and replaced with the B18 bus until its abandonment in 2002

== Long Island Electric ==
The Long Island Electric Railway operated lines in eastern Queens until 1926. These lines were later operated by Jamaica Central Railways, until the company reorganized as Jamaica Buses, with bus service replacing trolley service in 1933.

Name	From	To	Route	Notes
	Jamaica	Nassau County towards Hempstead (became NY&LI at the city line)	Jamaica Avenue and Hempstead Avenue	abandoned November 25, 1933 now the Q110 bus
Liberty Avenue Line	Brooklyn	Jamaica	Liberty Avenue and South Road	abandoned 1933 now the Q112 bus
Jamaica−Far Rockaway line	Jamaica	Far Rockaway	Guy R. Brewer Boulevard, Rockaway Boulevard, Mott Avenue, Wanser Avenue, and the Long Island Rail Road's Far Rockaway Branch	established in 1897 and abandoned December 2, 1933 now the Q113 and Q114 buses.

== Manhattan and Queens Traction ==
The Manhattan and Queens Traction Company was originally part of the South Shore Traction Company based in Sayville, New York, which planned to build lines throughout Central and Western Suffolk, as well as Nassau and Queens County, before selling off its only lines to the Suffolk Traction Company, and moving to New York City. Before reorganizing itself as M&QT, it operated a line across the Queensboro Bridge from Manhattan to Long Island City until April 1937.

Name	From	To	Route	Notes
Queens Boulevard Line	Manhattan	South Jamaica	Queens Boulevard and Sutphin Boulevard	established January 29, 1913 and abandoned April 17, 1937 now the Q60 bus
Van Dam Industrial Spur	Long Island City	Long Island City	Van Dam Street	abandoned

== New York and Long Island Traction ==
The New York and Long Island Traction Company operated east to Freeport, Hempstead, and Mineola in Nassau County.

Name	From	To	Route	Notes
Mineola Line	Queens Village	Nassau County towards Mineola	Jamaica Avenue	abandoned April 3, 1926 now the n24 bus
Jamaica-Hempstead Line	Jamaica (Long Island Electric Railway terminates at the Queens-Nassau Line)	Hempstead	160th Street Jamaica to Belmont Park on 160th Street, Jamaica Avenue, and Hempstead Avenue (Turnpike)	Joint NY&LI - LIER service. abandoned April 3, 1926 now the n6 bus
Brooklyn-Freeport Line	Brooklyn	Nassau County towards Freeport	Rockaway Boulevard, North Conduit Avenue, and Sunrise Highway	abandoned April 3, 1926; parts of line replaced by Q7, Q85, n4 buses

== New York and Queens County ==
The New York and Queens County Railway operated in northern Queens. In 1932 it was reorganized as the New York and Queens Transit Corporation, and ended trolley service as it evolved into the Queens-Nassau Transit Lines in 1937.

Name	From	To	Route	Notes
Flushing–Jamaica Line	Jamaica	Flushing	164th Street, 45th Avenue, and Bowne Street	established 1899 and abandoned 1937 now part of the Q65 bus
College Point Line	Flushing	College Point	College Point Boulevard	established 1890 and abandoned 1937 now part of the Q65 bus
Corona Line	Woodside	Flushing	37th Avenue, 61st Street, Woodside Avenue, Broadway, 43rd Avenue, and private right-of-way	established 1894 and abandoned August 3, 1925
Cemetery Route	Hunters Point	Middle Village	Borden Avenue and 69th Street	established March 1, 1874 and abandoned 1937 now the Q67 bus

== Steinway Lines ==
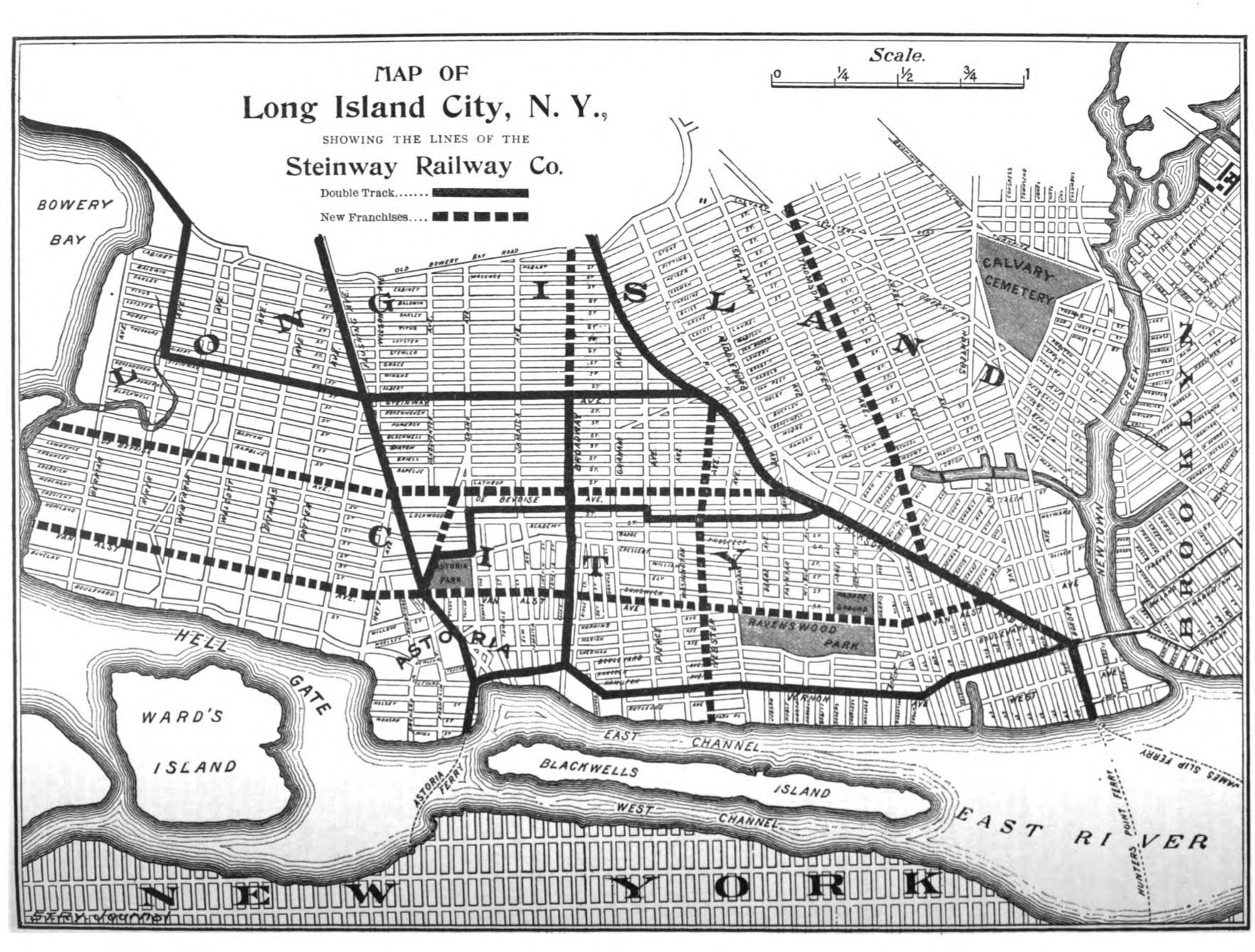
Long Island City Steinway Railway Company c 1894

The Steinway Railway started operating in northwestern Queens in 1922. In the fall of 1939, the company was renamed as Steinway Omnibus and began operating bus lines over former trolley lines and in 1959 changed their name again to Steinway Transit.

Name	From	To	Route	Notes
Steinway Street Line	Midtown Manhattan; 59th Street & 2nd Avenue	Steinway	Jackson Avenue, Northern Boulevard, Steinway Street, and 19th Avenue	established 08/12/1883 abandoned 11/01/1939 now the Q101 bus
31st Street Line	Long Island City or Midtown Manhattan; 59th Street & 2nd Avenue	Astoria Ferry	Jackson Avenue, 31st Street, Newtown Avenue, and Astoria Boulevard	established 1894 abandoned 09/29/1939 now the Q102 bus
Vernon Boulevard Line	Hunters Point	Astoria Ferry	Vernon Boulevard	established June 1875 abandoned 09/29/1939 now the Q103 bus
Broadway Line	Astoria Ferry	Woodside	Broadway	established 1894 abandoned 09/29/1939 now the Q104 bus
Flushing Avenue Line	Astoria	Bowery Bay	Astoria Boulevard	established 1894 abandoned 12/06/1935 now the Q19 bus
Jackson Avenue Line	Long Island City	Woodside	Jackson Avenue, Northern Blvd	established 1894 abandoned 09/29/1939 replaced partially by B62, Q100 buses

== Ocean Electric ==
The Ocean Electric Railway operated on The Rockaways.

Name	From	To	Route	Notes
	Hammels	Neponsit	Rockaway Beach Boulevard from Beach 75th Street to Beach 116th Street, north to Newport Avenue, west to Beach 142nd Street to Neponsit Avenue to west of Beach 149th Street.	Built from 1904-1916; abandoned October 25, 1928 now Q22 and Q35
	Hammels	Hammels Beach	Hammels Wye; South Leg along Beach 84th Street (formerly Fairview Avenue).	abandoned
	Far Rockaway	Hammels	Long Island Rail Road on the original LIRR tracks shared with LIRR trains Far Rockaway Branch then down Beach 84th Street to join the Rockaway Beach Boulevard line.	abandoned September 9, 1926 now New York City Subway's IND Rockaway Line
	Far Rockaway	Roche's Beach	Long Island Rail Road original Far Rockaway station at Mott Avenue, south on Central Avenue (now Beach 20th Street to New Haven and Brookhaven Avenue, then south on Rockaway Turnpike (now Beach 19th Street) to Roche's Beach, just south of today's Seagirt Boulevard	abandoned September 14, 1924

== New York and North Shore Traction ==
The New York and North Shore Traction Company operated from northeastern Queens east into Nassau County. By 1920, the company converted itself into the North Shore Bus Company.

Name	From	To	Route	Notes
North Shore Line	Flushing	Nassau County towards Roslyn and Hicksville LIRR Station	35th Avenue, 39th Avenue, and Northern Boulevard	established 1907 abandoned 1920 replaced by Q12, n20(G/H) buses
Whitestone Line	Flushing	Whitestone	35th Avenue, 149th Street, and 150th Street	established August 1910 abandoned 1920 operated as the Q14 bus until 2010, replaced with similar Q15A

== See also ==
- List of streetcar lines in the Bronx
- List of streetcar lines in Brooklyn
- List of streetcar lines in Manhattan
- List of streetcar lines in Staten Island
- List of streetcar lines on Long Island
- List of town tramway systems in the United States
