= Q114 =

Q114 or Q-114 may refer to:

- Quran 114, "Mankind" (an-nās), the last chapter of the Islamic Holy book
- Jamaica–Far Rockaway line, which consists partially of the Q114 bus line
