= Concord Line =

Concord Line may refer to the following transit lines:

- Yellow Line of Bay Area Rapid Transit (BART), known as the Concord–Daly City line until 1995
- Concord Line (Staten Island), a streetcar line of the Staten Island Midland Railway abandoned 1927 and replaced by buses; see List of streetcar lines in Staten Island#Staten Island Midland Railway
