= Boulevard Line (disambiguation) =

The Boulevard Line is a railway line in Copenhagen, Denmark.

Boulevard Line may also refer to the following transit lines:

- Broadway Line (Midtown Manhattan surface), previously the Boulevard Line, in New York City
- Southern Boulevard Line, a streetcar Line in the Bronx, New York City
