= List of streetcar lines in Brooklyn =

Brooklyn, New York streetcar network

The following streetcar lines once operated in Brooklyn, New York City, New York, United States.

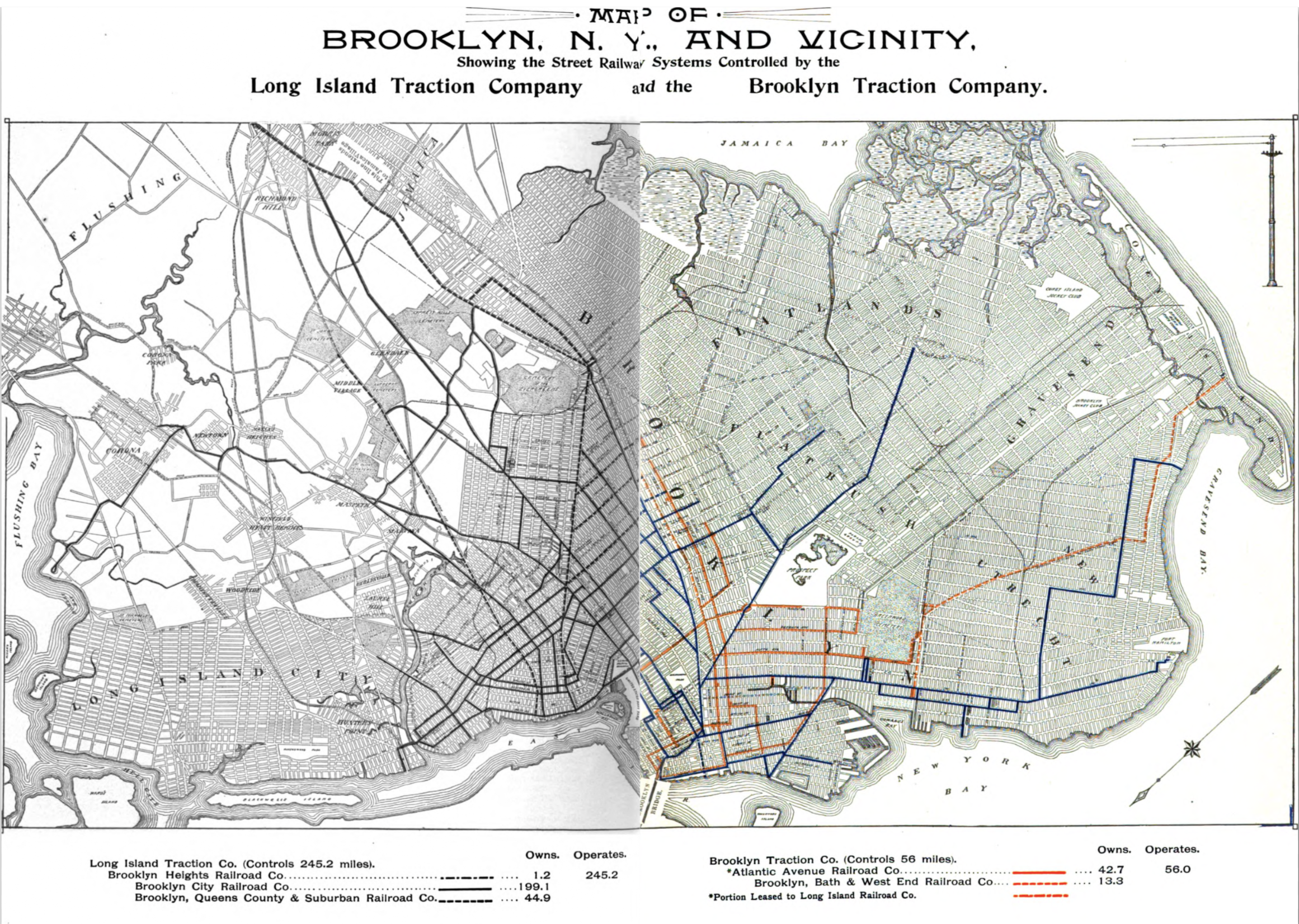
Long Island Traction Company And Brooklyn Traction Company c. 1894

== History ==
The history of surface line operation in Brooklyn is long and very complicated, and is best presented under one of the following sub-articles which maintain the proper family tree for each of the lines listed below. These subsidiary articles are:

BRT/BMT subsidiaries

- Brooklyn and Queens Transit Corporation, the main company after 1929
- Brooklyn City Railroad
- Brooklyn Heights Railroad
- Brooklyn, Queens County and Suburban Railroad
- Coney Island and Brooklyn Railroad
- Coney Island and Gravesend Railway
- Nassau Electric Railroad

Companies not owned by the BRT/BMT or jointly owned

- Brooklyn and North River Railroad
- Bush Terminal Railroad
- Coney Island, Sheepshead Bay and Ocean Avenue Railroad
- Manhattan Bridge Three Cent Line
- Marine Railway
- Maspeth Railroad and Bridge Company
- Van Brunt Street and Erie Basin Railroad

== BMT ==
Almost every surface line in Brooklyn eventually came under control of the Brooklyn and Queens Transit Corporation, a subsidiary of the Brooklyn–Manhattan Transit Corporation, prior to the takeover of the lines by the New York City Board of Transportation on June 5, 1940. Many of the lines ended at the Brooklyn Bridge in downtown Brooklyn or Williamsburg Bridge in Williamsburg, with some going over to the Park Row or Essex Street terminals in Manhattan. The small number of BMT streetcar lines that operated only in Queens are also included here.

Name	From	To	Major streets	Established	Abandoned	Notes
=== East-west lines ===
Sea Gate Line	Sea Gate	Sheepshead Bay	Surf Avenue, Neptune Avenue, and Emmons Avenue	1890	December 1, 1946	now the B36 bus
Norton's Point Line	Sea Gate	Coney Island	private right-of-way	1879	November 7, 1948	now the B74 bus
Norton's Point Shuttle	Sea Gate	West 37th St.	private right-of-way	1910	September 26, 1935; also ran June 1943	became B36 shuttle bus, now discontinued
86th Street Line	Bay Ridge	Coney Island	3rd Avenue, 5th Avenue, 86th Street, and Cropsey Avenue	1894	August 12, 1948	now the B1 bus (part)
Bay Ridge Avenue Line	Bay Ridge	Coney Island	3rd Avenue, Bay Ridge Avenue, 13th Avenue, 86th Street, and Cropsey Avenue	May 22, 1891	May 15, 1949	now the B64 bus (part)
Bergen Beach Line	Flatbush	Bergen Beach	Flatbush Avenue and Avenue N	May 1896	August 6, 1930 (east end); March 5, 1951 (whole line)	now the B41 bus
Cortelyou Road Line	Kensington	Flatbush	Cortelyou Road and 16th Avenue	1898	July 23, 1930	Converted to trolley coach on July 23, 1930, then to B23 bus on 10/31/1956. Discontinued on June 27, 2010 due to a budget crisis.
Holy Cross Cemetery Line	Prospect Park South	Holy Cross Cemetery	Tilden Avenue	September 1883	April 1, 1951	
Church Avenue Line	Greenwood Heights	Brownsville	39th Street and Church Avenue	1897	October 31, 1956	now the B35 bus
Gravesend and Church Avenues Line	Kensington	Brownsville	Gravesend Avenue (McDonald Avenue) and Church Avenue	1895	June 1, 1949	same service continued as short run of Church Avenue Line until 10/31/1956; not replaced
New Lots Avenue Line	Brownsville	New Lots	New Lots Avenue	1881	September 1, 1947	now the B15 bus
Fifteenth Street Line	Red Hook	Windsor Terrace	Hamilton Avenue and 15th Street	1890s	December 1, 1945	now the B61 and B67 buses (parts)
Union Street Line	Red Hook	Windsor Terrace	Union Street and Prospect Park West	1894	December 1, 1945	then replaced by the B71 bus until 2010
St. Johns Place Line	Downtown	Brownsville	Atlantic Avenue, Sterling Place, St. Johns Place, and Rockaway Avenue	1877	August 24, 1947	now the B45 bus
Bergen Street Line	Red Hook	Ozone Park, Queens	Sackett Street, Bergen Street, and Liberty Avenue	1894	July 20, 1947	now the B65 bus
Fulton Street Line	Downtown	East New York	Fulton Street	July 3, 1854	August 10, 1941	now the B25 bus
Putnam Avenue Line	Downtown	Ridgewood, Queens	Fulton Street, Putnam Avenue, and Halsey Street	1885	September 21, 1941; restored November 29, 1942 to February 5, 1950	now the B26 bus
Greene and Gates Avenues Line	Downtown	Ridgewood, Queens	Fulton Street, Greene Avenue, and Gates Avenue	1874	October 5, 1941	now the B52 bus
DeKalb Avenue Line	Brooklyn Bridge	Ridgewood, Queens	DeKalb Avenue and Seneca Avenue	1862	January 30, 1949	now the B38 bus
Montague Street Line	Downtown		Montague Street	July 20, 1891	1924	
Myrtle Avenue and Court Street Line	Red Hook	Ridgewood, Queens	Court Street and Myrtle Avenue	April 3, 1938	July 17, 1949	now the B54 and B57 buses
Park Avenue Line	Brooklyn Bridge	Trinity Cemetery	Park Avenue and Wilson Avenue	1871	June 19, 1930	
Flushing Avenue Line	Brooklyn Bridge	Maspeth, Queens	Flushing Avenue	July 3, 1854	November 21, 1948	now the B57 bus
Broadway Line	Williamsburg Bridge	Cypress Hills	Broadway and Fulton Street	March 22, 1859	January 15, 1950	now the Q24 (ex-B22) bus
Williamsburg Bridge Local	Williamsburg Bridge		Williamsburg Bridge	December 1, 1923	December 4, 1948	now the B39 bus
Jamaica Line	Ocean Hill	Jamaica, Queens	Fulton Street and Jamaica Avenue	May 7, 1863	November 30, 1947	now the Q56 (ex-B56) bus
Bushwick Avenue Line	Williamsburg Bridge	Ridgewood, Queens	Meserole Street, Bushwick Avenue, and Myrtle Avenue	May 26, 1878	September 1, 1947	Originally ran to Cypress Hills Cemetery (see below), route split May 1, 1946
Wilson Avenue Line	Williamsburg Bridge	Canarsie	Johnson Avenue, Wilson Avenue, and Rockaway Avenue	1895	May 27, 1951	now the B60 bus
Cypress Hills Cemetery Line	Ridgewood, Queens	Cypress Hills Cemetery, Queens	Cypress Avenue	1878	September 1, 1947	Route split from the Bushwick Avenue Line (see above) on May 1, 1946, then replaced by the B18 bus until 2002, now the B13 bus
Richmond Hill Line	Ridgewood, Queens	Jamaica, Queens	Myrtle Avenue	late 1890s	April 26, 1950	now the Q55 (ex-B55) bus
Metropolitan Avenue Line	Williamsburg Bridge	Jamaica, Queens	Grand Street and Metropolitan Avenue	1895	June 12, 1949	now the Q54 (ex-B53) bus
Metropolitan Avenue Shuttle	Williamsburg	East Williamsburg	Metropolitan Avenue	Unknown	1920	
Flushing-Ridgewood Line	Ridgewood, Queens	Flushing, Queens	Fresh Pond Road, Grand Avenue, and Corona Avenue	November 1899	July 17, 1949	now the Q58 (ex-B58) bus
Grand Street Line	Williamsburg	Maspeth, Queens	Grand Street and Grand Avenue	October 15, 1860	December 11, 1949	now the Q59 (ex-B59) bus
Calvary Cemetery Line	Greenpoint	Calvary Cemetery, Queens	Greenpoint Avenue	1889	January 26, 1930	now the B24 bus
=== North-south lines ===
Furman Street Line	Red Hook	Downtown	Columbia Street and Furman Street	1860	1930	
Hicks Street Line	Red Hook	Cobble Hill	Hicks Street	1889	January 24, 1920	
Erie Basin Line	Red Hook	Brooklyn Bridge	Columbia Street	late 1890s	March 5, 1944	now the B61 bus
Crosstown Line	Red Hook	Greenpoint	Columbia Street, Flushing Avenue, Wythe Avenue, Driggs Avenue, Bedford Avenue, and Manhattan Avenue	May 28, 1855	January 27, 1951	now the B61 and B62 bus
65th Street-Fort Hamilton Line	Fort Hamilton	Sunset Park	3rd Avenue and 2nd Avenue	1892	March 1, 1942	
Hamilton Avenue Line	Bay Ridge	Red Hook	3rd Avenue and Hamilton Avenue	1868	November 1, 1943	
Smith Street Line	Windsor Terrace	Brooklyn Bridge	9th Street and Smith Street	1866	February 11, 1951	now the B57 bus
Third Avenue Line	Fort Hamilton	Brooklyn Bridge	3rd Avenue	July 3, 1854	March 1, 1942	B37 bus until June 2010, service restored June 29, 2014
Fifth Avenue Line	Fort Hamilton	Cobble Hill	5th Avenue and Atlantic Avenue	1868	February 20, 1949	now the B63 bus
Seventh Avenue Line	Windsor Terrace	Brooklyn Bridge	7th Avenue and Flatbush Avenue	late 1890s	February 11, 1951	now the B67 bus
Eighth Avenue Line	Bay Ridge	Sunset Park	8th Avenue and 39th Street	December 1, 1916	May 15, 1949	now the B70 bus
West End Line	Coney Island	Sunset Park	New Utrecht Avenue	1864	June 28, 1947	
Sixteenth Avenue Line	New Utrecht	Kensington	16th Avenue	1893	January 26, 1930	absorbed into Cortelyou Road trolley coach
McDonald Avenue Line	Coney Island	Windsor Terrace	McDonald Avenue	1916	October 31, 1956	portion north of Cortelyou Road now the B67/B69 buses
Coney Island Avenue Line	Coney Island	Windsor Terrace	Coney Island Avenue	1890	November 30, 1955	now the B68 bus
Greenpoint Line	Downtown	Greenpoint	Myrtle Avenue, Kent Avenue, and Franklin Street	October 1854	August 17, 1942	
Flatbush Avenue Line	Marine Park	Downtown	Flatbush Avenue	July 14, 1860	March 5, 1951	now the B41 bus
Vanderbilt Avenue Line	Windsor Terrace	Downtown	Vanderbilt Avenue and Flushing Avenue	1869	August 20, 1950	now the B69 bus
Franklin Avenue Line	Prospect Park South	Williamsburg Bridge	Franklin Avenue and Wythe Avenue	1895	October 28, 1945	now the B48 bus
Ocean Avenue Line	Sheepshead Bay	Crown Heights	Ocean Avenue and Rogers Avenue	1895	April 29, 1951	now the B49 bus
Nostrand Avenue Line	Sheepshead Bay	Williamsburg Bridge	Nostrand Avenue and Lee Avenue	1895	April 1, 1951	now the B44 bus
Meeker and Marcy Avenues Line	Stuyvesant Heights	Greenpoint	Marcy Avenue and Meeker Avenue	1912	April 17, 1939	now the B24 bus
Tompkins Avenue Line	Prospect Park	Williamsburg Bridge	Empire Boulevard, Kingston Avenue, and Tompkins Avenue	1873	August 24, 1947	now the B43 bus
Union Avenue Line	Ridgewood, Queens	Greenpoint	Knickerbocker Avenue, Flushing Avenue, and Union Avenue	April 27, 1890	December 1, 1945	
Lorimer Street Line	Prospect Park South	Greenpoint	Franklin Avenue, Lorimer Street, and Nassau Avenue	November 6, 1884	December 14, 1947	now the B48 bus
Graham Avenue Line	Brooklyn Bridge	Hunters Point, Queens	Flushing Avenue, Graham Avenue, and Manhattan Avenue	July 3, 1854	December 21, 1948	now the B43 bus
Sumner Avenue Line	Brownsville	Williamsburg Bridge	98th Street, Sumner Avenue (Marcus Garvey Boulevard), and Broadway	1866	July 20, 1947	now the B15 bus
Utica and Reid Avenues Line	Flatlands	Williamsburg Bridge	Utica Avenue, Reid Avenue, and Broadway	1937	March 18, 1951	now the B46 bus
Ralph Avenue Line	Brownsville	Williamsburg Bridge	98th Street, Ralph Avenue, and Broadway	late 1890s	November 1, 1943	now the B47 bus
Ralph and Rockaway Avenues Line	Brownsville	Williamsburg Bridge	Rockaway Avenue, Ralph Avenue, and Broadway	1905	May 27, 1951	now the B47 bus
Rockaway Parkway Line	Canarsie Landing	Canarsie	Rockaway Parkway	1917	April 29, 1951	now the B42 bus
North Beach Line	Elmhurst, Queens	North Beach, Queens	Junction Boulevard	1895	August 24, 1949	now the Q72 (ex-B72) bus

== Other companies ==
Name	From	To	Major streets	Established	Abandoned	Notes
Manhattan Bridge Three Cent Line	Downtown Brooklyn	Chinatown, Manhattan	Manhattan Bridge	September 1912	November 13, 1929	
Hudson Avenue Line	Prospect Park	Downtown	Flatbush Avenue and Hudson Avenue	late 1867	1871	

== See also ==
- Trolley dodger
- List of streetcar lines in the Bronx
- List of streetcar lines in Manhattan
- List of streetcar lines in Queens
- List of streetcar lines in Staten Island
- List of streetcar lines on Long Island
- List of town tramway systems in the United States

== Maps ==
- BMT map
- Google Map of New York City streetcar lines as of 1932
- Animated timeline of NYC streetcar abandonment 1932–1957
