= Guy R. Brewer Boulevard buses =

Bus routes in Queens, New York

q111 rush, q113 ltd, q114 rush q115
- Jamaica−Far Rockaway line
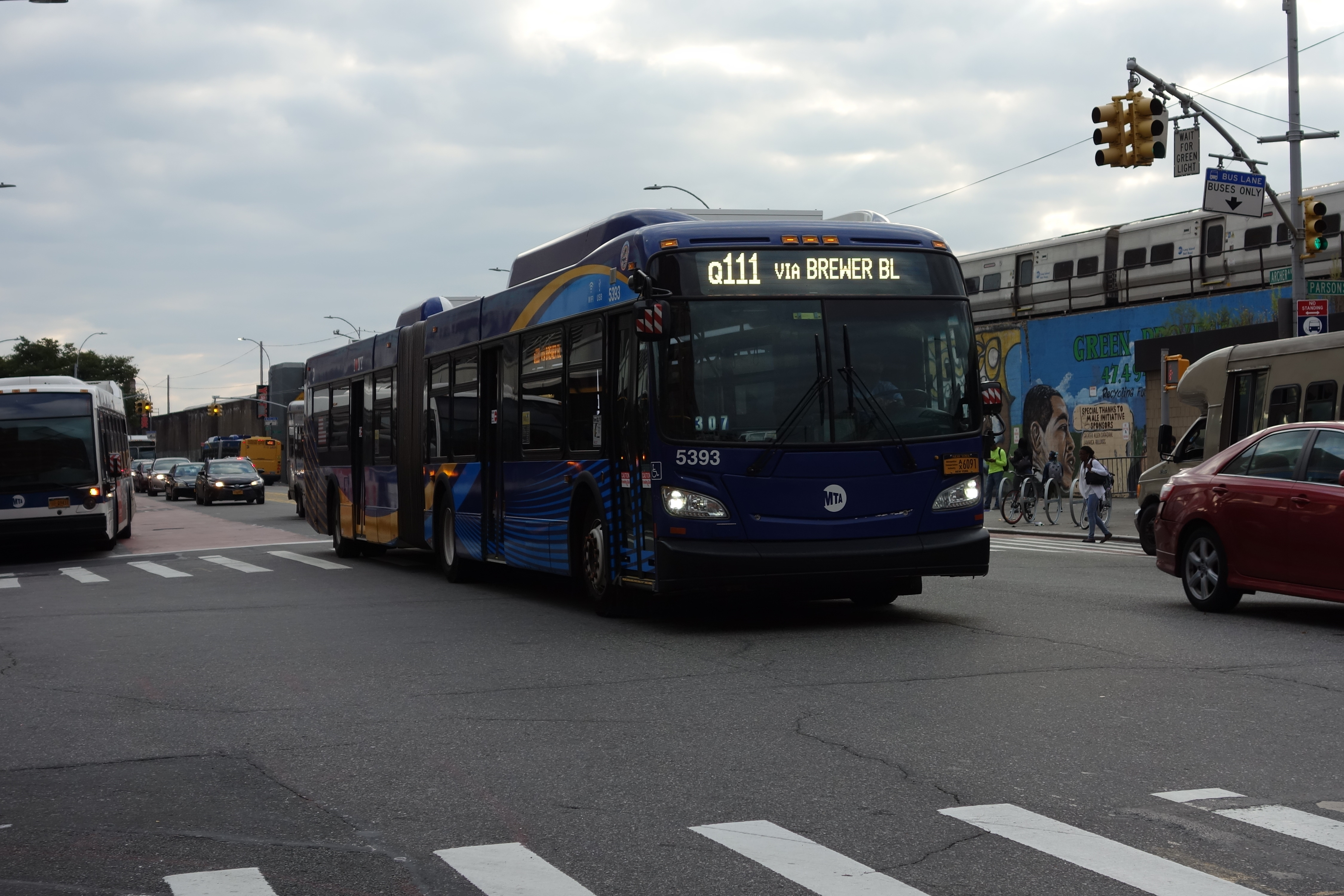
- A 2016 XD60 (5393) on the Parsons Boulevard-bound Q111 at Jamaica Center in October 2018

Overview
- System: MTA Regional Bus Operations
- Operator: MTA Bus Company
- Garage: Baisley Park Depot
- Vehicle: New Flyer Xcelsior XD60 (main vehicle); Nova Bus LFS (supplemental service)
- Began service: 1897 (trolley line); 1930 (Rockaway-Nassau bus); 1933 (full bus route)

Route
- Locale: Queens and Nassau County, New York, U.S.
- Communities served: Queens: Jamaica, South Jamaica, Springfield Gardens, Rosedale, Far Rockaway; Nassau County: Woodmere, Cedarhurst, Inwood, Lawrence
- Start: Jamaica, Queens – Parsons Boulevard & Hillside Avenue
- Via: Guy R. Brewer Boulevard, 147th Avenue (Q111), Rockaway Boulevard (Q113, Q114), Nassau Expressway (Q113)
- End: Q111: Rosedale, Queens – Francis Lewis Boulevard & 148th Avenue; Cedarhurst, Nassau County – Peninsula Boulevard and Rockaway Turnpike (select rush hours only); Q113/Q114: Far Rockaway, Queens – Seagirt Boulevard & Beach 20th Street Q115: Springfield Gardens – Guy R. Brewer Boulevard & Farmers Boulevard
- Length: Q111: 6.5 miles (10.5 km); Q113/Q114: 12 miles (19 km); Q115: 3.9 miles (6.3 km)

Service
- Operates: 24 hours (Q111, Q114, Q115) (Note: Q113 operates all times except early mornings and nights) (Note: Q114 operates local during early mornings and nights)
- Annual patronage: Q111: 1,932,574 (2025); Q113: 791,039 (2025); Q114: 1,361,806 (2025); Q115: 460,746 (2025)
- Transfers: Yes
- Timetable: Q111 Q113/Q114 Q115

The Q111, Q113, Q114, and Q115 bus routes constitute a public transit line between the Jamaica and Far Rockaway neighborhoods of Queens, New York City, running primarily along Guy R. Brewer Boulevard. The Q113 limited and Q114 rush routes provide limited-stop service between Jamaica and Far Rockaway, connecting two major bus-subway hubs, and crossing into Nassau County. The Q115 local route runs exclusively within Queens. The Q111 rush route provides limited-stop service on Guy R. Brewer Boulevard and local service on 147th Avenue, running exclusively in Queens, with the exception of select rush-hour trips to or from Cedarhurst in Nassau County. Some of the last bus routes to be privately operated in the city, they are currently operated by the MTA Bus Company brand of MTA Regional Bus Operations. The Q113 and Q114 are one of the few public transit options between the Rockaway peninsula and "mainland" New York City.

The corridor was originally a streetcar line that began operation in 1897, referred to as the Far Rockaway line, Jamaica−Far Rockaway line, Far Rockaway−Jamaica line or Jamaica and Far Rockaway line. In 1933, the railroad company reorganized as Jamaica Buses and began operating buses (the predecessor to the Q113) along the route under a franchise with New York City. The Q111 and Q113 would be operated under a subsidy of the New York City Department of Transportation (NYCDOT) until January 2006, when Jamaica Buses was absorbed by the MTA Bus Company. On August 31, 2014, the Q114 was split from the Q113 to provide additional limited-stop service. On June 29, 2025, the Q115 was established to provide local service for all three routes.

== Route description and service ==
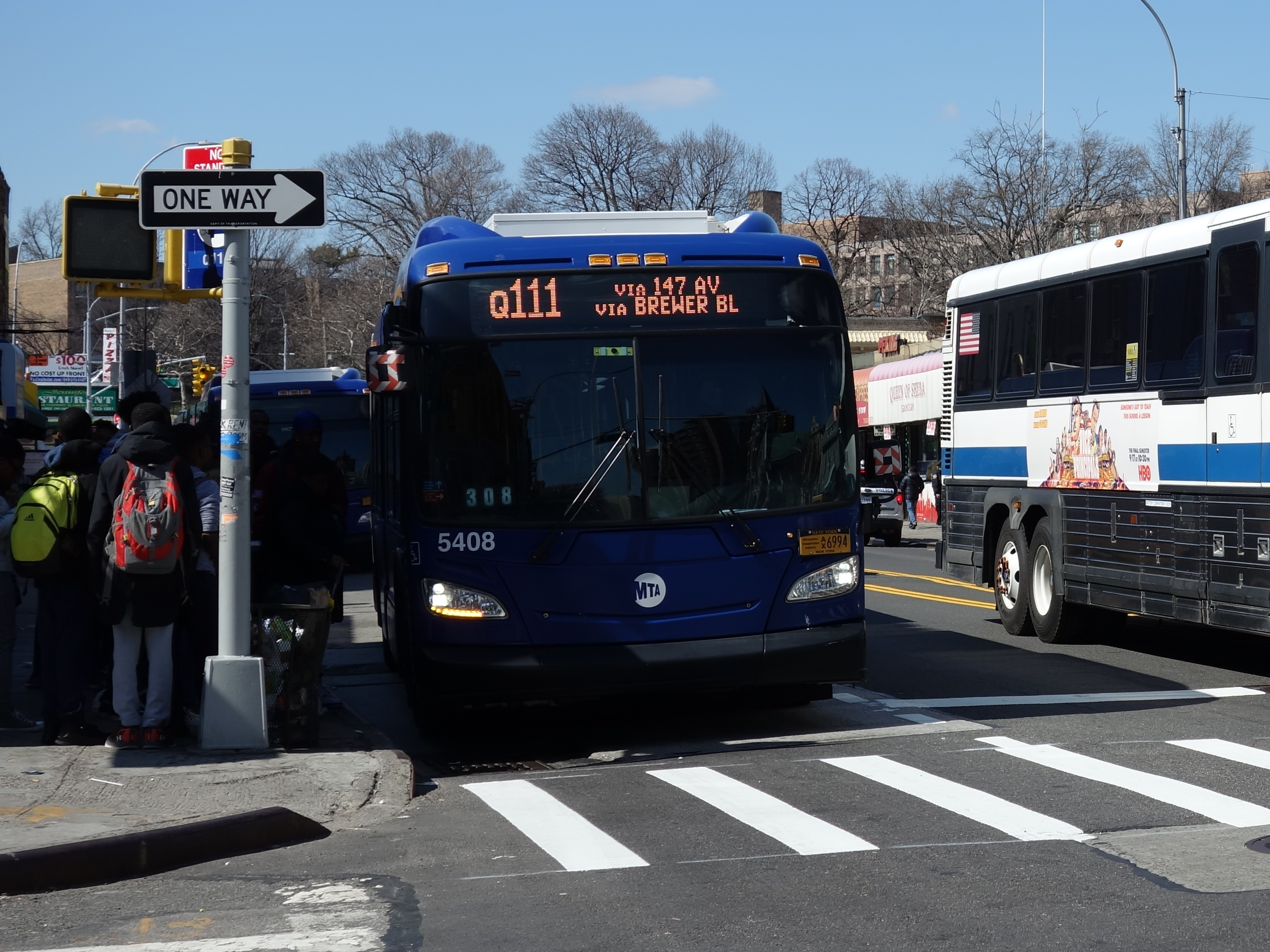
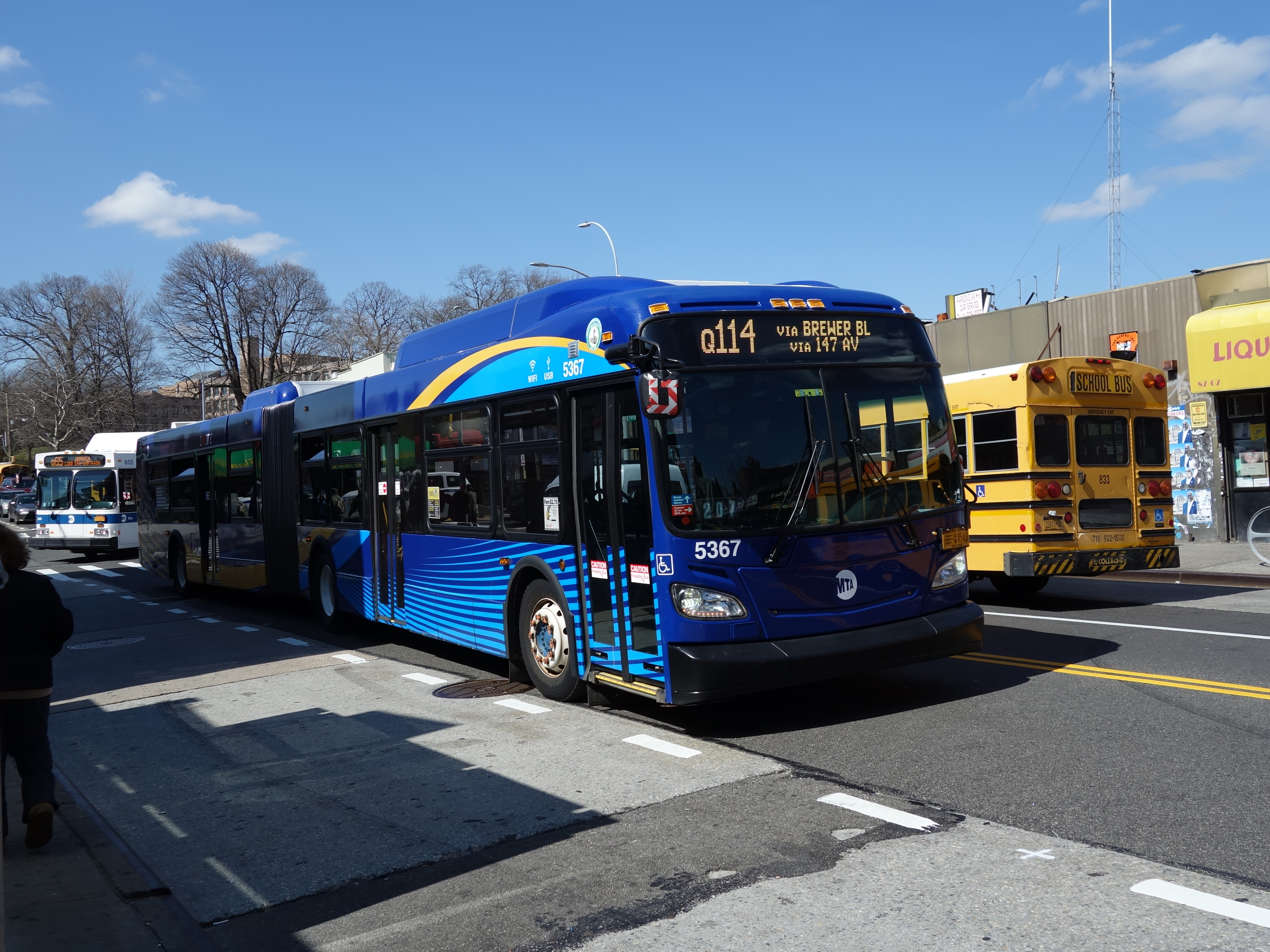
Two XD60s: one 2016 (5408) on the Jamaica-bound Q111 (top) terminating, and one 2015 (5367) on the Q114 Limited to Far Rockaway via 147th Avenue (bottom) at Parsons Boulevard/88th Avenue in Jamaica.

=== Streetcar route ===
The original streetcar line began at a terminal at 160th Street (at that time known as Washington Street) and Jamaica Avenue. The terminal was later moved east to what is now 168th Street when the New York City Subway's BMT Jamaica Line was extended to the area in 1918. The route ran south down New York Avenue through southeast Queens, then connected to Nassau County along Rockaway Road and the Jamaica and Rockaway Turnpike. It then traveled west along several local streets before reentering Queens and terminating at Mott Avenue at the Far Rockaway station of the Long Island Rail Road's Far Rockaway Branch (now the Far Rockaway–Mott Avenue station of the Rockaway subway line). The line terminated at the Far Rockaway station's plaza and trolley terminal, which was shared with the lines of the Ocean Electric Railway. Short-run service was operated between Jamaica and Farmers Avenue (now Farmers Boulevard) or Hook Creek at the county line; similar short-turn service is currently employed by the entire route of the Q115 bus. Originally single-tracked, the line gained a second track between Jamaica and Baisley Boulevard beginning in 1911.

=== Current bus service ===
The current Q113 and Q114 routes largely follow the original trolley route, with some exceptions. Prior to June 2019, the Q114 turned onto 147th Avenue and Brookville Boulevard near the Queens-Nassau County line before following the Nassau County route to Far Rockaway. The Q113 routing, running the original route between Jamaica and the county line, bypasses most of the Nassau County route via the southern portion of the Nassau Expressway and Central Avenue. Since June 2019, the Q114 operates along the same route as the Q113 between Jamaica and the Nassau Expressway, because of flooding problems along southern Brookville Boulevard. South of the Far Rockaway subway station, both routes travel along Mott Avenue, Cornaga Avenue, Beach 9th Street, and Seagirt Boulevard to Beach 20th Street near the Wavecrest Gardens Apartments; this extension was added in the 1950s. Both the Q113 and Q114 are direct successors to the streetcar line, and make limited stops along Guy R. Brewer Boulevard in Queens. The Q113 is classified as a limited-stop route, making limited stops for its entire length, while the Q114 is a rush route, making local stops outside the limited section on Guy R. Brewer Boulevard.

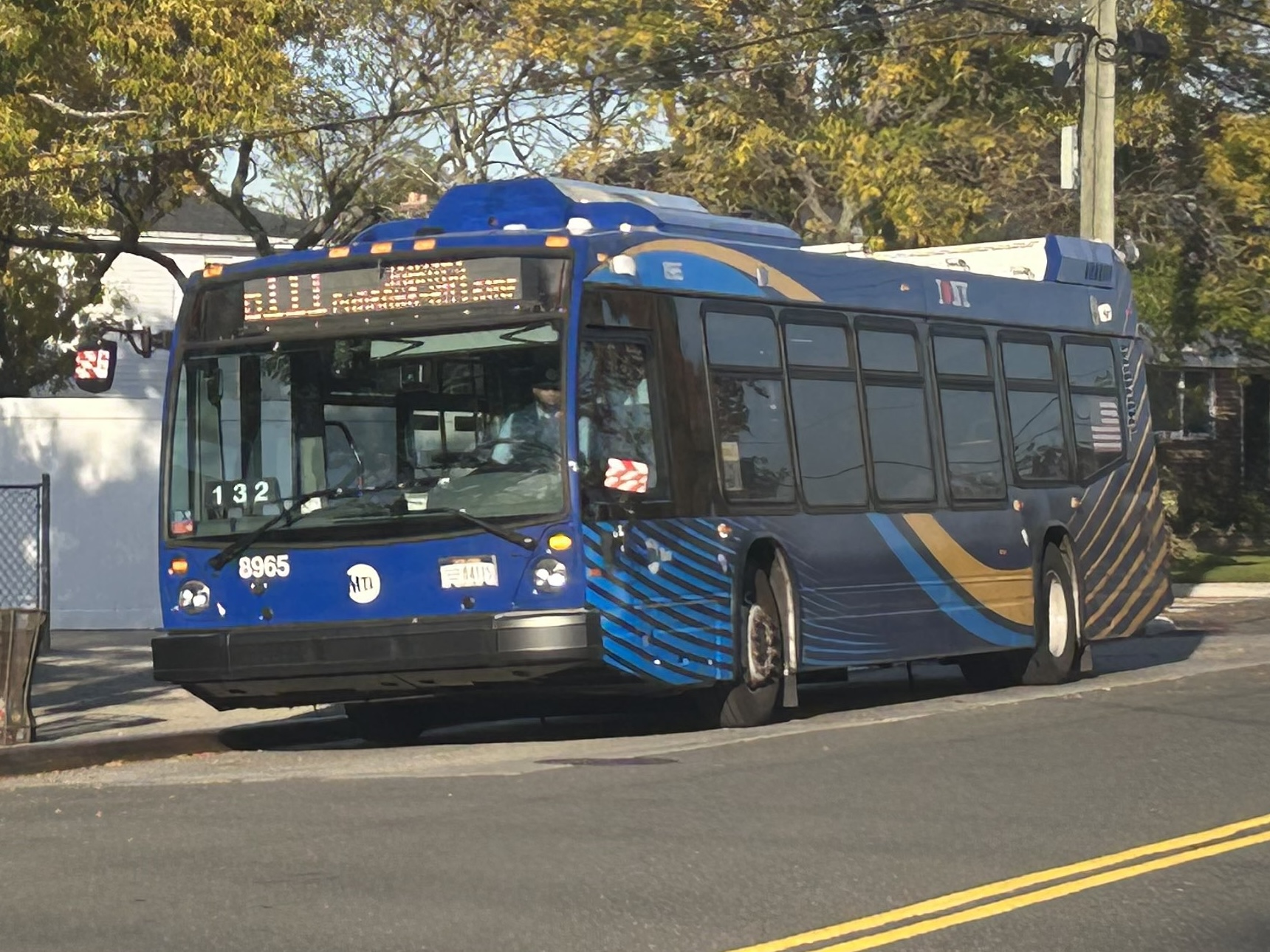
A 2022 NovaBus LFS (8965) on the Jamaica-bound Q111, used as a supplement to the articulated fleet

The Q111 is classified as a rush route, making limited stops south along Brewer Boulevard and local stops east along 147th Avenue. It terminates at Francis Lewis Boulevard in Rosedale, Queens near the border with South Valley Stream in Nassau County. One weekday trip in each direction continues past Rosedale into Nassau County, turning south and west via Peninsula Boulevard and ending at Rockaway Turnpike in Cedarhurst. This trip departs Jamaica at 7:30am and departs Cedarhurst at 4:14pm. The Q111 route along 147th Avenue and in Nassau County mirrors the original planned routing of the trolley line, which was never constructed.

The Q115 makes local stops south along Brewer Boulevard, terminating at Farmers Boulevard in Springfield Gardens. When school is in session, two trips to Jamaica originate at 132nd Avenue where Redwood Middle School is located. Both depart at 2:30pm and make the same local stops as regular service.

Many roads along the routes have been renamed. New York Avenue would later become New York Boulevard, and was renamed Guy R. Brewer Boulevard in 1982 after local politician Guy Brewer. Rockaway Road and the Jamaica and Rockaway Turnpike are now called Rockaway Boulevard (in Queens) and the Rockaway Turnpike (in Nassau), respectively.

== History ==
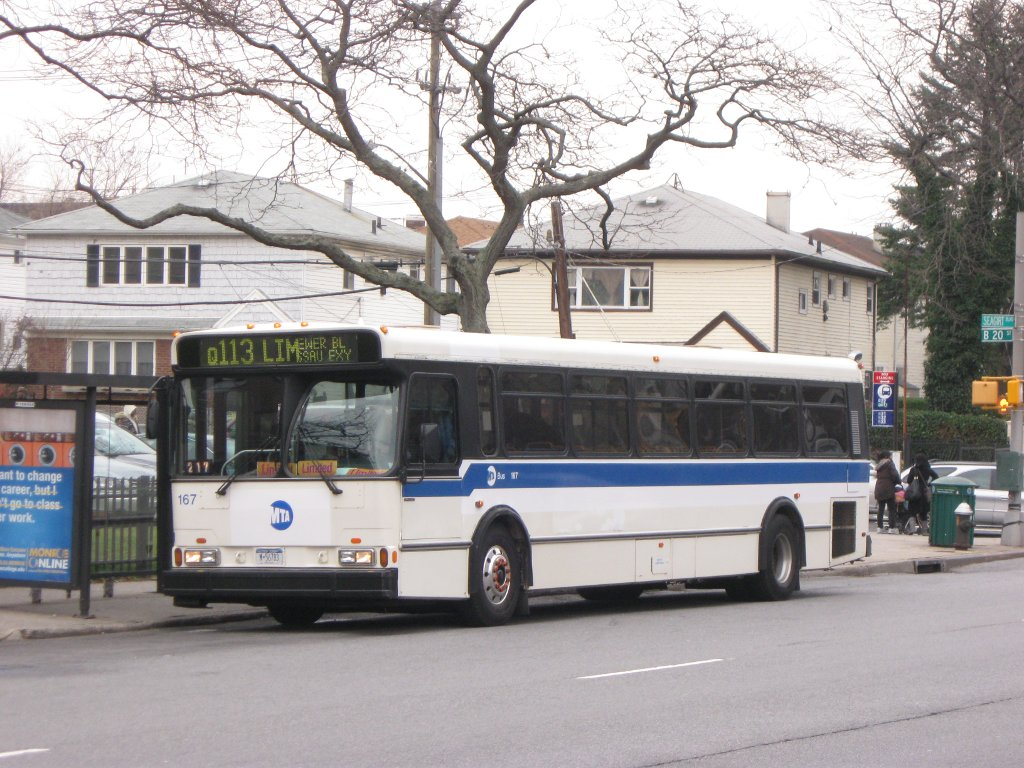
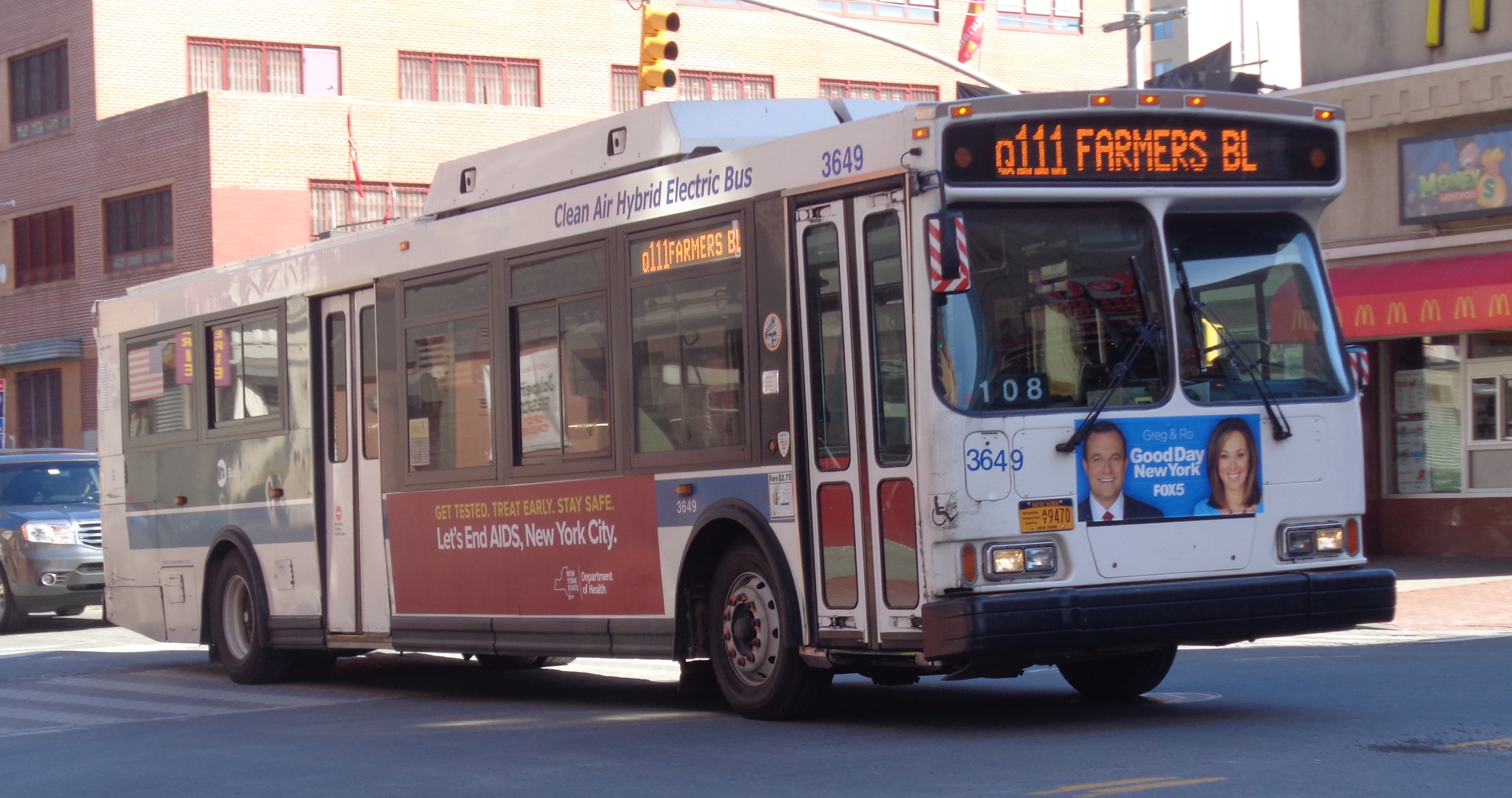
A former Bee-Line Bus System 1996 Orion V (167) on the Q113, which just ended its trip at the Seagirt Boulevard terminus in Far Rockaway (top), and an Orion VII OG HEV (3649) on the Farmers Blvd-bound Q111 at Parsons Blvd/Jamaica Ave (bottom). Both buses are retired.

=== As a streetcar line ===
The streetcar line was originally operated by the Long Island Electric Railway (LIER), which was incorporated in 1894. On October 11 of that year, the company applied for a line between the then-Long Island towns of Jamaica, Hempstead, and Far Rockaway. Construction of the line began in 1895 along with the company's streetcar line along Liberty Avenue. As originally planned, the line would have been long and circuitous south of 147th Avenue, traveling east into Rosedale and Valley Stream, then back west towards Far Rockaway. The more direct Rockaway Turnpike route was ultimately selected, after the company secured exclusive rights to use the road. While the company's other three lines began operation in 1896, the Far Rockaway line was delayed due to construction over swampy land near the Queens-Nassau border, and disputes with the Long Island Rail Road over the crossing with the LIRR's Montauk Branch. The first portion of the line between Jamaica and Baisley Boulevard began on September 1, 1896, operating on Sundays only. Service was extended south to Farmers Boulevard on May 2, 1897. The full line to Far Rockaway began operations on June 6, 1897.

On October 13, 1899, the LIER was purchased by the New York & North Shore Railway Company (a subsidiary of the New York and Queens County Railway), which operated the Flushing–Jamaica Line along today's 164th Street. On March 12, 1900, through service on the combined routes began between Flushing and Far Rockaway. This service ended on August 1, 1901 after the LIER was bought out by the Hogan Brothers, a group of trolley line surveyors who worked on both the Flushing and Far Rockaway lines. A second track was added to the line between Jamaica and Linden Boulevard in 1903. The LIER would become part of the Interborough Rapid Transit Company (IRT) on January 19, 1906. The interest of IRT owner August Belmont, Jr. (builder of Belmont Park served by another LIER line) originated from the popularity of the Far Rockaway line during summer months to the resorts on the Rockaway peninsula, and its service to the Jamaica Race Course in modern-day Rochdale Village, Queens. Much of the rest of the route had yet to be paved or settled, with trolleys stopping at major farmhouses and fields as opposed to intersections. The tracks along Rockaway Boulevard were susceptible to washout due to marshy land and the tidal conditions of Hook Creek.

In October 1914, a second track began operation between Jamaica and Linden Boulevard. In 1916, New York City took over the rights to Rockaway Boulevard/Rockaway Turnpike, paving and grading the road. The western half of the road was widened, while the eastern half on which the trolley line resided retained its original width. In 1917, the line would receive automatic block signaling and iron trolley poles to replace the original wooden ones.

=== Decline and conversion into bus service ===
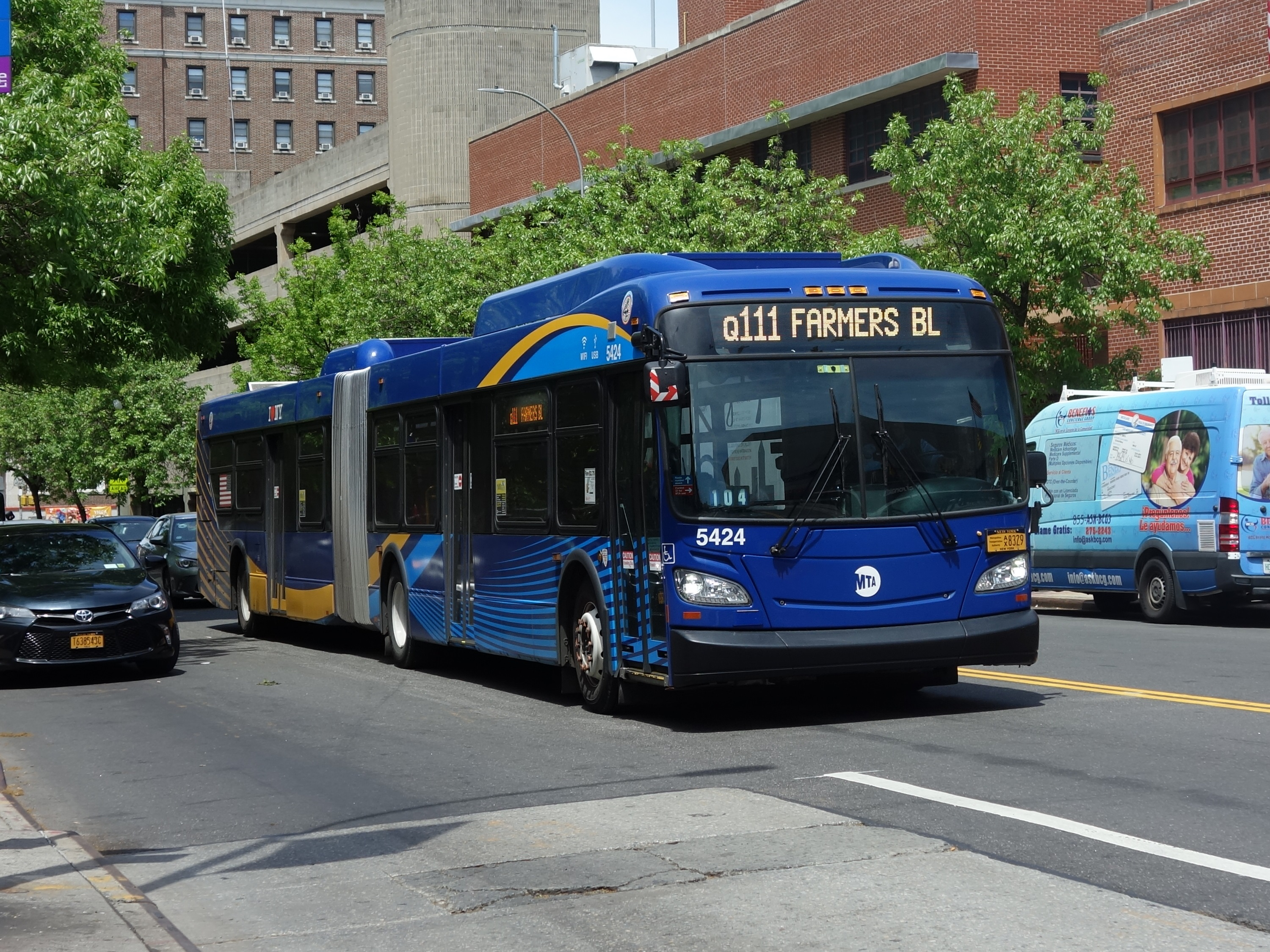
Until June 28, 2025, alternate Q111 buses, like this 2016 XD60 (5424) at Parsons Blvd/Jamaica Ave pictured here, short-turned at Farmers Boulevard in Springfield Gardens.These trips have been converted to the Q115.

Following labor and material shortages due to World War I, the line and its rolling stock fell into disrepair, leading to complaints from passengers, increased headways between trips, and high employee turnover. On July 6, 1921, a fire broke out at the company's trolley barn at New York Avenue and Linden Boulevard in Cedar Manor (modern-day South Jamaica/Springfield Gardens), destroying much of the company's rolling stock. The railway went bankrupt and was sold in 1926 by the company's debtors, the Bank of Manhattan (now part of JPMorgan Chase), reorganizing as the Jamaica Central Railways in March of that year. As part of the reboot, one mile of new track was installed along the Far Rockaway line, including an extension of the second New York Boulevard track south to Farmers Boulevard. The line retained its popularity due to housing booms in South Jamaica and other neighborhoods along the route.

Around this time, many streetcar lines in Queens and the rest of the city began to be replaced by buses, particularly after the unification of city's three primary transit companies in June 1940. On April 21, 1931, Jamaica Central created a subsidiary known as Jamaica Buses, Inc. to convert its trolley lines to bus franchises. The Rockaway-Nassau portion of the Far Rockaway route began operating as a bus line (without a franchise) in September 1930, with the streetcar line between Jamaica and the county line continuing to operate. On November 12, 1933 the full route began operations as a single bus line. The Jamaica-Far Rockaway service would become "Route B". Due to the length of the route, it originally operated on a two-zone (then-ten cent) fare, as did the streetcar route before it. Additional buses were run between Jamaica and Baisley Boulevard at the Jamaica Racetrack. Beginning on June 15, 1935, during summer months (June to September) the route was extended south from Far Rockaway station to Seagirt Avenue (now Seagirt Boulevard) to serve Ostend Beach, Roche Beach, and other beaches on the southern coast of the Rockaway peninsula. The northern terminal was moved from Jamaica Avenue to the Parsons Boulevard station of the IND Queens Boulevard Line on Hillside Avenue on April 24, 1937. On October 10, 1938, overnight service was initiated on the route, running between Jamaica and either Farmers Boulevard or the Nassau County line at Hook Creek.

On April 20, 1952, the route was extended full-time from the Far Rockaway station to Seagirt Boulevard, in order to serve the Wavecrest Gardens Apartments, and following the disruption of LIRR service between the Rockaway Peninsula and mainland Queens. At this time, the route was split into Route B (Jamaica-Hook Creek) and Route D (Far Rockaway), in addition to the special Jamaica Racetrack service (Route H). Around 1960, Route D was renamed the Q113, and Route B became the Q111 route between Jamaica and the intersection of New York Boulevard (Brewer Boulevard) and 147th Avenue. In July of that year, an extension of the Q111 was approved, creating its current routing in Rosedale and Nassau County. At some point after 1975, the Q113 was rerouted from Rockaway Boulevard to Brookville Boulevard south of 147th Avenue. This was due to the crash of Eastern Air Lines Flight 66 on June 24, 1975, which shut down Rockaway Boulevard for some time; the change to the Q113 route was made permanent around this time. On December 11, 1988, the travel path of the Q111 and Q113 in Downtown Jamaica was altered to serve the newly opened Jamaica Center–Parsons/Archer subway station.

=== MTA takeover ===
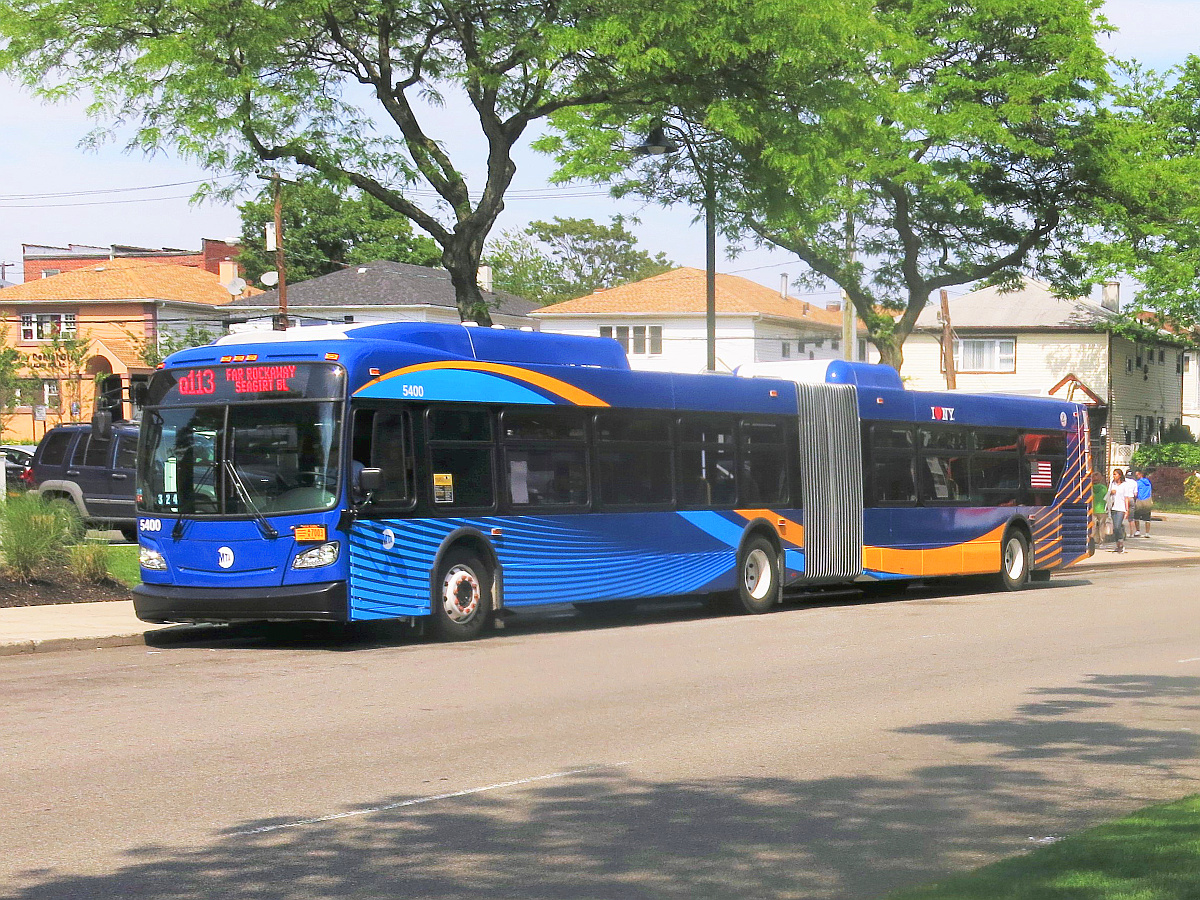
A 2016 New Flyer Xcelsior XD60 (5400) on the Q113 at Seagirt Boulevard in Far Rockaway having just completed its trip, with the new 2016 livery.

On January 30, 2006, the MTA Bus Company took over operations of the Jamaica Bus routes. At this time, the Q113 ran two services: the Q113 local, which made all stops, and the Q113 Limited (also known as the "Q113 Express"), which skipped all stops between Rockaway Turnpike at the Queens–Nassau border and the Far Rockaway LIRR station. The limited service only ran during weekday rush hours. On March 12, 2007, the limited-stop service was expanded to midday hours and Saturdays, and limited stops were added to the route along Guy R. Brewer Boulevard. The Q113 limited was also shifted in Nassau County from Sheridan Boulevard and Burnside Avenue onto the Nassau Expressway. In addition, the Q113 local was expanded to 24-hours a day at this time.

On July 3, 2011, the Q113 Limited was shifted from 147th Avenue and Brookville Boulevard onto the more direct route via Rockaway Boulevard between the end of Brewer Boulevard and the Nassau County line. As part of the change, two limited stops (Springfield Lane/222nd Street on 147th Avenue, and 147th Road on Brookville Boulevard) were eliminated, becoming local-only stops, while a limited stop at 147th Avenue and Brewer Boulevard was added for the Q113 Limited. In late 2012, the Q113 local was routed away from the Far Rockaway LIRR station at Nameoke Street, instead traveling directly to the Mott Avenue subway station. In addition, a three-hour transfer window applied on the MetroCard from transfers from any subway station to the Q113 or Q22, and then to the n31, n32, and n33 routes of NICE.

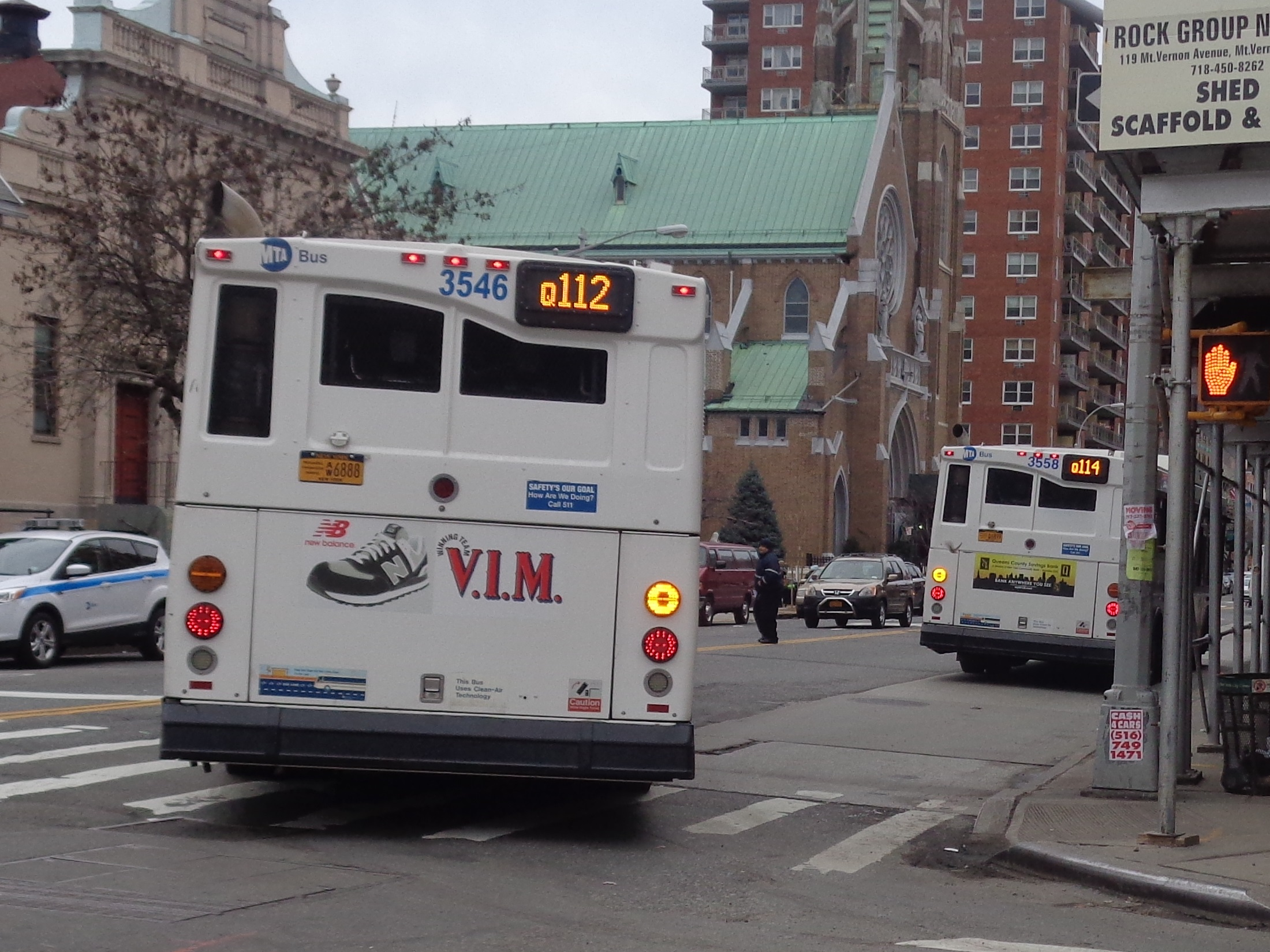
Two 2006 Orion VII OG HEVs, 3546 on the Q112 and 3558 on the Q114 at Parsons Boulevard/88th Avenue.

On August 31, 2014, the Q113 local was converted into a limited-stop service called the Q114, running along Guy R. Brewer Boulevard, 147th Avenue, and Brookville Boulevard, and local in Nassau County and the Rockaways. The limited stops eliminated in 2011 were restored for Q114 service, with two additional limited stops added. The 2007, 2011, and 2014 changes had originally been proposed in a Urbitran Associates study for the New York City Department of Transportation in 2004, when the bus routes were privately operated. On January 4, 2015, Q114 local service was expanded into evening hours, and Q114 local service now began operating after Q113 Limited service ends. On February 1, 2015, Q114 Limited service started stopping at 147th Avenue and 230th Place (Jamaica-bound) and 147th Avenue and 230th Street (Far Rockaway-bound). In 2016, the corridor began operating low-floor articulated buses in conjunction with its standard-length fleet. This was planned going back to 2012. In August 2016, the MTA announced plans to eventually convert the Q113 into a Select Bus Service (SBS) route; this had been previously proposed by the Pratt Center for Community Development.

In April 2017, the MTA announced its intention to modify the Q114's route in Nassau County in order to speed up service. West of Lawrence Avenue, the route would continue westward on Mott Avenue instead of turning south on Lawrence. The Q114 would instead turn southwest onto Nassau Expressway before turning northwest onto Bayview Avenue, eliminating a zigzagged route along Lawrence Avenue, Wanser Avenue, and Doughty Boulevard. The new routing was implemented on July 2, 2017. The reroute eliminated four bus stops in the Inwood neighborhood. On January 6, 2019, the southern terminal for Jamaica-bound buses was shifted to Seagirt Boulevard and Crest Road from Beach 20th Street and Seagirt Boulevard. On June 30, 2019, Q114 service was shifted from 147th Avenue and Brookville Boulevard onto a more direct route via Rockaway Boulevard between the end of Brewer Boulevard and the Nassau County line due to regular tidal flooding on Brookville Boulevard. As part of the change, four limited stops (222nd Street on 147th Avenue, 230th Street/230th Place on 147th Avenue, 147th Road and Brookville Boulevard, and 148th Road and Brookville Boulevard) were discontinued. Service at the stops along 147th Avenue would continue to be served by the Q111, while service was entirely discontinued at the stops along Brookville Boulevard.

=== Bus redesign ===
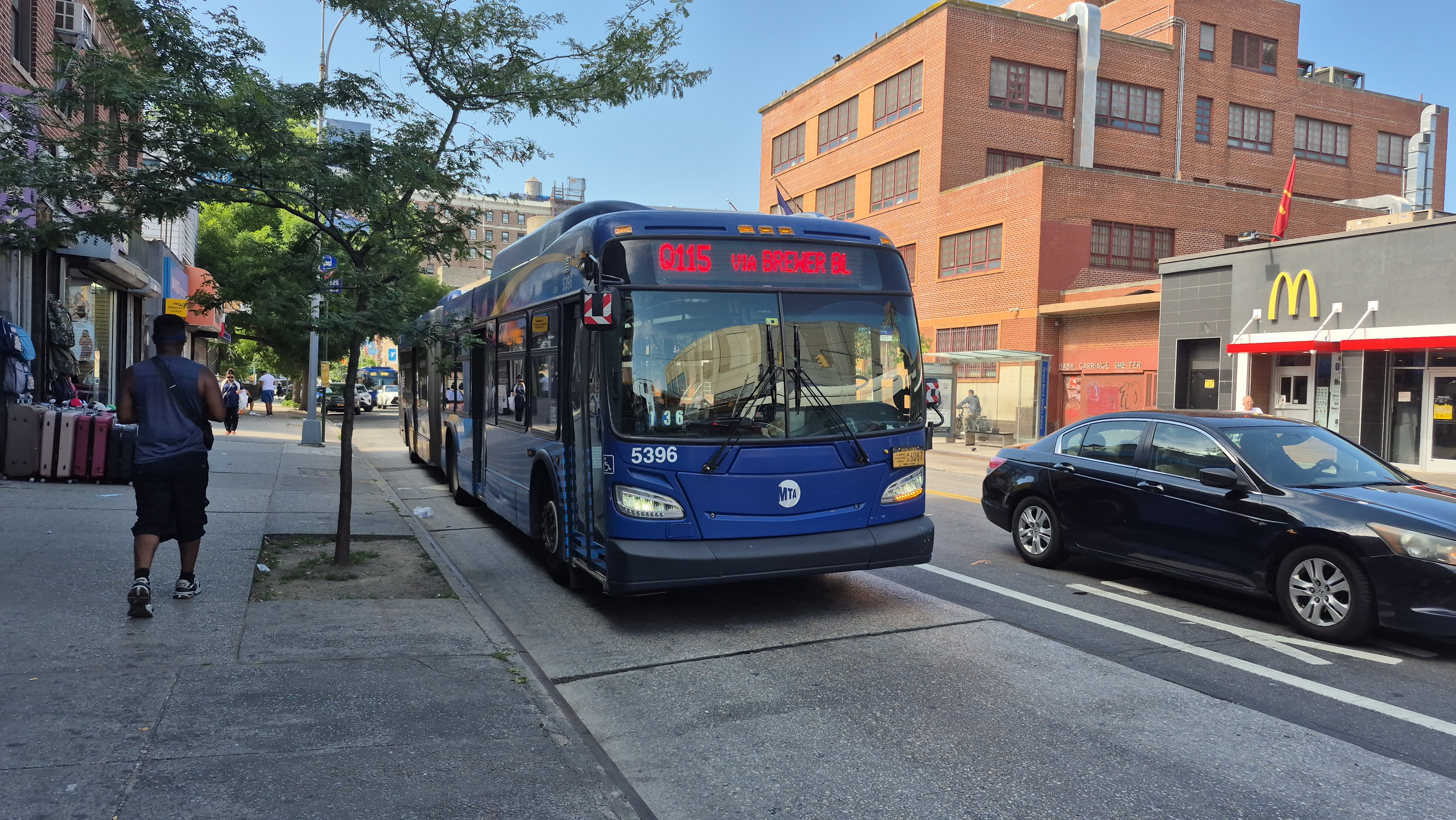
XD60 5396 on the Q115

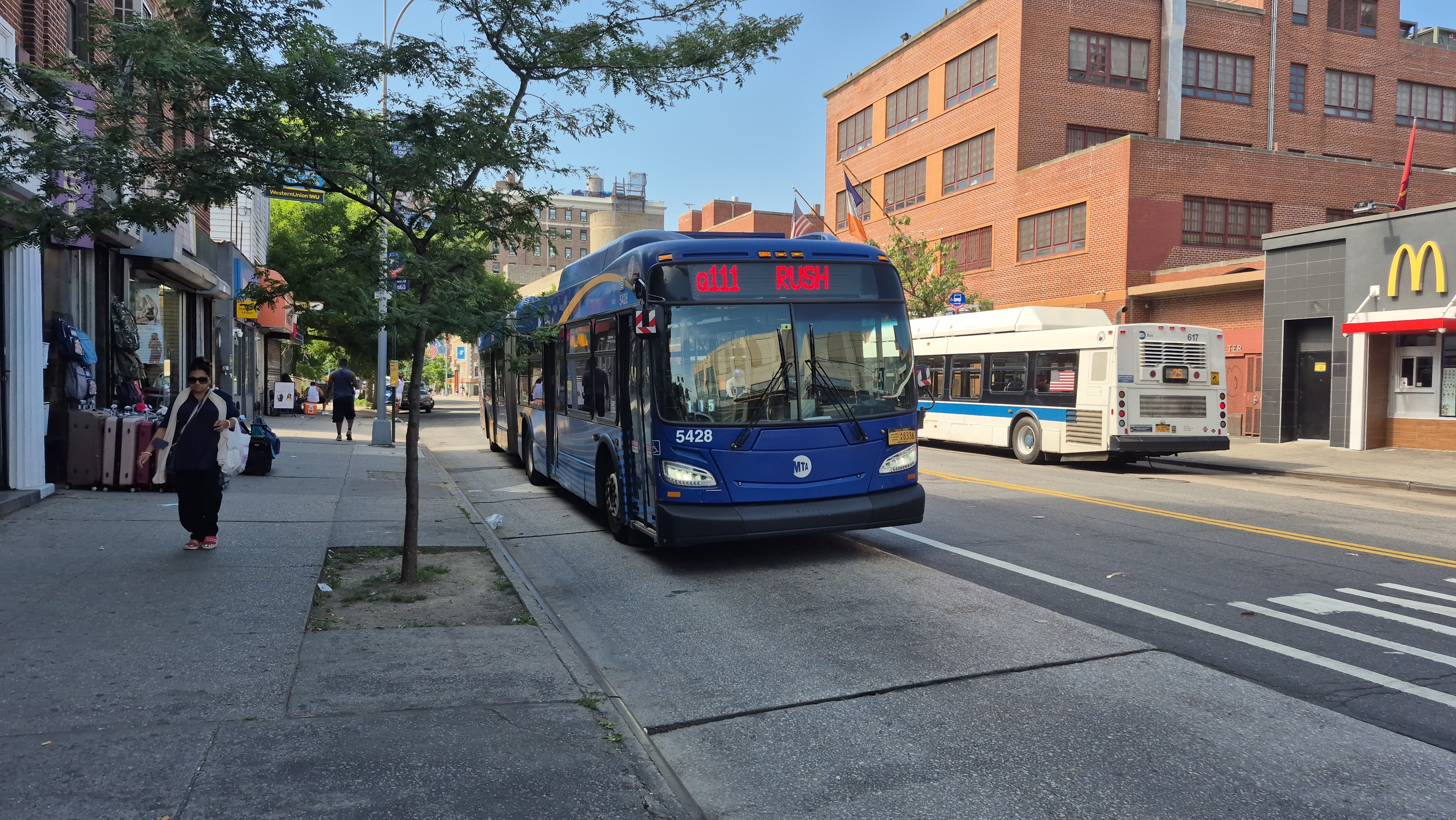
XD60 5428 on the Q111 Rush

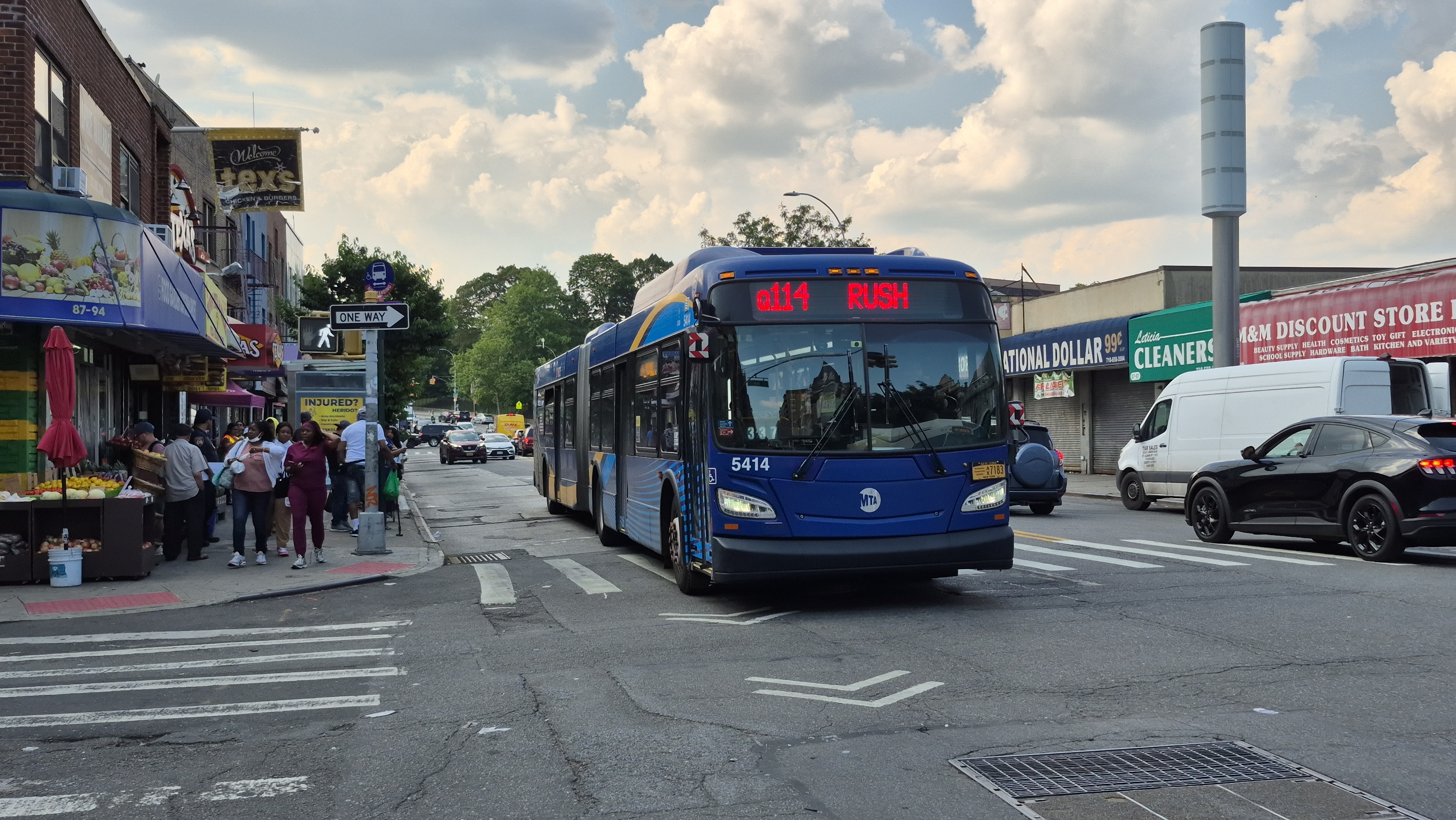
2015 NFI XD60 #5414 on the Q114 Rush

In December 2019, the MTA released a draft redesign of the Queens bus network. As part of the redesign, the Guy R. Brewer Boulevard routes would have been replaced with a "high-density" limited-stop route, the QT13, and an "intra-borough" route, the QT19. Two "subway connector" routes would have also run on the corridor with a non-stop section on Guy R. Brewer Boulevard: the QT43, taking over part of the old Q85 to Rosedale, and the QT45, taking over part of the old Q114 to 147th Avenue. The redesign was delayed due to the COVID-19 pandemic in New York City in 2020, and the original draft plan was dropped due to negative feedback.

A revised plan was released in March 2022. As part of the new plan, the Q111 and Q114 would instead become "rush" routes with nonstop sections on Guy R. Brewer Boulevard, stopping only at major intersections and transfer points, with a new Q115 route making local stops on the corridor. However, the Peninsula Boulevard Q111 trips and the Q113 would be discontinued.

A final Queens bus-redesign plan was released in December 2023. The Q111 and Q114 would still become "rush" routes with limited-stop sections, and the new Q115 route would make local stops on the corridor, but the Q111's Peninsula Boulevard trips would be retained.

On December 17, 2024, addendums to the final plan were released. Among these, the current Q113 route was retained but will directly serve the intersection of Guy R. Brewer Boulevard & Archer Avenue like the other route proposals on Brewer serving Jamaica. The Q114 had stop changes made and current frequencies retained, while the new Q115 also had stop changes made and will become a "Local" route. On January 29, 2025, the current plan was approved by the MTA Board, and the Queens Bus Redesign went into effect in two different phases during Summer 2025. All four routes are part of Phase I, which began on June 29, 2025.

== Incidents ==
On October 14, 1995, an out-of-control car collided head-on with a Q113 bus along the narrow Brookville Boulevard. The accident killed two of the people in the car as well as injured 25 people on the bus, three of them critically.

== See also ==
- List of streetcar lines in Queens
- Jamaica Buses
