= List of streetcar lines in Staten Island =

The following electric streetcar lines once operated in Staten Island, New York, United States. The first trip was on July 4, 1892, and the last was on January 26, 1934. The streetcar lines were mostly preceded by horse-car lines, and have generally been superseded by MTA Staten Island bus routes.

== Richmond Light and Railroad Company ==
The Richmond Light and Railroad Company (previously named Staten Island Electric Railroad, later Richmond Railways) operated a system in northeastern Staten Island.

Name	From	To	Streets	Established	Abandoned	Notes
1	Port Ivory	St. George Ferry Terminal	Richmond Terrace	1902	January 21, 1934	now the S40 bus
2	Shore Acres	St. George Ferry Terminal	Bay Street	1902	January 7, 1934	now the S51 bus
3	Port Richmond	St. George Ferry Terminal	Richmond Terrace, Clove Road, Castleton Avenue, Brook Street, Victory Boulevard, and Bay Street	1902	January 14, 1934	now the S46 bus
4	Bulls Head	Port Richmond	Richmond Avenue, Forest Avenue, and Port Richmond Avenue	1902	December 31, 1933	now the S59 bus
5	Ward Hill	St. George Ferry Terminal	Jersey Street and Richmond Terrace	1902	December 31, 1933	now the S52 bus
6	Port Richmond	St. George Ferry Terminal	Richmond Terrace	1902	January 21, 1934	now the S40 bus
7	Port Richmond	St. George Ferry Terminal	Richmond Terrace, Jewett Avenue, Victory Boulevard, and Bay Street	1927	January 26, 1934	originally the Midland Railway's Silver Lake Line; now the S62 and S66 buses

== Staten Island Midland Railway ==
The Staten Island Midland Railway (previously Midland Electric Railroad) operated in central Staten Island, and was continued by city-operated streetcars and trolleybuses during 1920–1927.

Name	From	To	Streets	Established	Abandoned	Notes
Midland Beach Line	Midland Beach	St. George Ferry Terminal	Midland Avenue, Lincoln Avenue, Richmond Road, Van Duzer Street, Broad Street, Canal Street, Wright Street, Van Duzer Street, Victory Boulevard, and Bay Street	1896	1927	operated as the S72 bus until 1992
Concord Line	Port Richmond	St. George Ferry Terminal	Richmond Terrace, Jewett Avenue, Victory Boulevard, Clove Road, Richmond Road, Van Duzer Street, Broad Street, Canal Street, Wright Street, Van Duzer Street, Montgomery Street, Hyatt Street, and Bay Street	June 10, 1886	October 16, 1927	now the S53, S66, and S74 buses
Manor Road Line	Todt Hill	Livingston	Manor Road, Delafield Avenue, Clove Road, Castleton Avenue, and Broadway	1885	August 21, 1927	now the S54 bus
Richmond Line	Richmondtown	St. George Ferry Terminal	Richmond Road, Van Duzer Street, Broad Street, Canal Street, Wright Street, Van Duzer Street, Victory Boulevard, and Bay Street	1868	October 16, 1927	now the S74 bus
Silver Lake Line	Port Richmond	St. George Ferry Terminal	Richmond Terrace, Jewett Avenue, Victory Boulevard, and Bay Street	1896	–	taken over by the Richmond Light and Railroad Company as route 7 in 1927

== See also ==
- Staten Island Railway
- List of streetcar lines in the Bronx
- List of streetcar lines in Brooklyn
- List of streetcar lines in Manhattan
- List of streetcar lines in Queens
- List of streetcar systems in the United States
