= List of streetcar lines in the Bronx =

The following streetcar lines once operated in the Bronx, New York City, New York, United States. Every line in the Bronx eventually came under control of the Third Avenue Railway.

Name	From	To	Major streets	Established	Abandoned	Notes
A Westchester Avenue Line	The Hub	Westchester Square	Westchester Avenue	1892	July 10, 1948	now the Bx4 (formerly Bx42) bus
B Bailey Avenue Line	Kingsbridge	Fordham	Bailey Avenue and Fordham Road	1906	June 27, 1948	converted to the former Bx24 bus. Bx1 and Bx10 now covers all of Bailey Avenue
B Boston Road Line	Mott Haven	Morris Park	3rd Avenue, Boston Road, and Morris Park Avenue	1892	August 21, 1948	now the Bx21 (formerly Bx26) bus
C Bronx and Van Cortlandt Parks Crosstown Line	Riverdale (city line)	West Farms Square	Broadway, Kingsbridge Road, Fordham Road, Southern Boulevard, 180th Street, and Boston Road	1892	January 24, 1948	now the Bx9 (formerly Bx20) bus
City Island Line	Pelham Bay Park station on the Hell Gate Line	City Island	Orchard Beach Road and City Island Avenue	1884	August 8, 1919	Replaced in 1990 by the Bx29 bus
D Dyre Avenue Line	Eastchester		Dyre Avenue	Unknown	June 28, 1938	remnant of the Fifth Avenue Line in Mount Vernon, Westchester County
Fordham and Woodlawn Line	East Harlem, Manhattan	Woodlawn	3rd Avenue, Fordham Road, Webster Avenue, and Gun Hill Road	1892	July 1, 1918	
Jerome Avenue Line	Washington Heights, Manhattan	Woodlawn (city line)	155th Street and Jerome Avenue	1892	September 4, 1921	
L St. Ann's Avenue Line	Mott Haven	Morrisania	St. Ann's Avenue	1911	July 10, 1948	converted to the former Bx32 bus, discontinued in 1984.
M Morris Avenue Line	Mott Haven	Morrisania	Lincoln Avenue and Morris Avenue	1913	January 1, 1941	now the Bx32 (formerly Bx25) bus
O Ogden Avenue Line	Washington Heights, Manhattan	Washington Heights, Manhattan	155th Street, Ogden Avenue, and 181st Street	1892	October 25, 1947	now the Bx13 (formerly Bx37) bus
P Pelham Bay Park Line	Westchester Square	Pelham Bay Park	Westchester Avenue	1910	August 17, 1940	now the Bx24 (Bx14 before June 27, 2010; formerly Bx22).
Randall Avenue Line	unknown	Hunts Point?	Randall Avenue	Unknown	July 15, 1921	
S Harlem Shuttle	East Harlem, Manhattan	Mott Haven	3rd Avenue	1892	August 5, 1941	
S Sedgwick Avenue Line	Morrisania	East Tremont	161st Street, Sedgwick Avenue, Burnside Avenue, Tremont Avenue	1892	September 8, 1921 south of West Tremont Avenue (Morris Heights); June 27, 1948 east of West Tremont Avenue	became the Bx39 Sedgwick bus and Bx49 Highbridge bus, but no longer a bus route
S Southern Boulevard Line	Mott Haven	Belmont	Bruckner Boulevard and Southern Boulevard	1892	August 21, 1948	now the Bx19 (formerly Bx31) bus
T Tremont Avenue Line	Morris Heights	Throgs Neck	Burnside Avenue and Tremont Avenue	1892	August 21, 1948	now the Bx40 and Bx42 buses
U University Avenue Line	Washington Heights, Manhattan	Kingsbridge	181st Street, University Avenue, and Kingsbridge Road	1892	October 25, 1947	now the Bx3 (formerly Bx38) bus
V Sound View Avenue Line	Hunts Point	Clasons Point	Westchester Avenue and Sound View Avenue	May 29, 1909	March 8, 1947	now the Bx27 bus
V Williamsbridge Line	East Tremont	Wakefield (city line)	Tremont Avenue, Morris Park Avenue, and White Plains Road	1892	August 21, 1948	now the Bx39 (formerly Bx28) bus
W Webster and White Plains Avenues Line	The Hub	Wakefield (city line)	Melrose Avenue, Webster Avenue, Gun Hill Road, and White Plains Road	1892	June 27, 1948	now the Bx41 bus
W Willis Avenue Line	West 130th Street Ferry, Manhattan	Woodlawn (city line)	125th Street, Willis Avenue, Third Avenue, Fordham Road, Webster Avenue	1892	August 18, 1935 north of Fordham Road; August 5, 1941 south of Fordham Road	now the Bx15 (formerly Bx29) bus
X 138th Street Crosstown Line	Harlem, Manhattan	Port Morris	135th Street, Madison Avenue, and 138th Street	1892	July 10, 1948	now the Bx33 bus
X 149th Street Crosstown Line	Harlem, Manhattan	Hunts Point	145th Street and 149th Street	1911	August 16, 1947	now the Bx19 (formerly Bx30) bus
X 163rd Street Crosstown Line	Washington Heights, Manhattan	Hunts Point	155th Street, 161st Street, 163rd Street, and Hunts Point Avenue	1892	June 27, 1948	now the Bx6 (formerly Bx34) bus
X 167th Street Crosstown Line	Washington Heights, Manhattan	Hunts Point	181st Street, 167th Street, 168th Street, and 169th Street	1892	July 10, 1948	now the Bx35 bus
X 207th Street Crosstown Line	Inwood, Manhattan	Belmont	207th Street and Fordham Road	1911	January 24, 1948	formerly Bx19, but now part of the Bx12 bus
Z 180th Street Crosstown Line	Washington Heights, Manhattan	Unionport	181st Street, University Avenue, Tremont Avenue, Webster Avenue, 180th Street, Boston Road, and 177th Street	1892	October 25, 1947	now the Bx36, Bx40 and Bx42 buses

== See also ==
- List of streetcar lines in Brooklyn
- List of streetcar lines in Manhattan
- List of streetcar lines in Queens
- List of streetcar lines in Staten Island
- List of town tramway systems in the United States
