= Jamaica Buses =

Defunct bus company in New York City

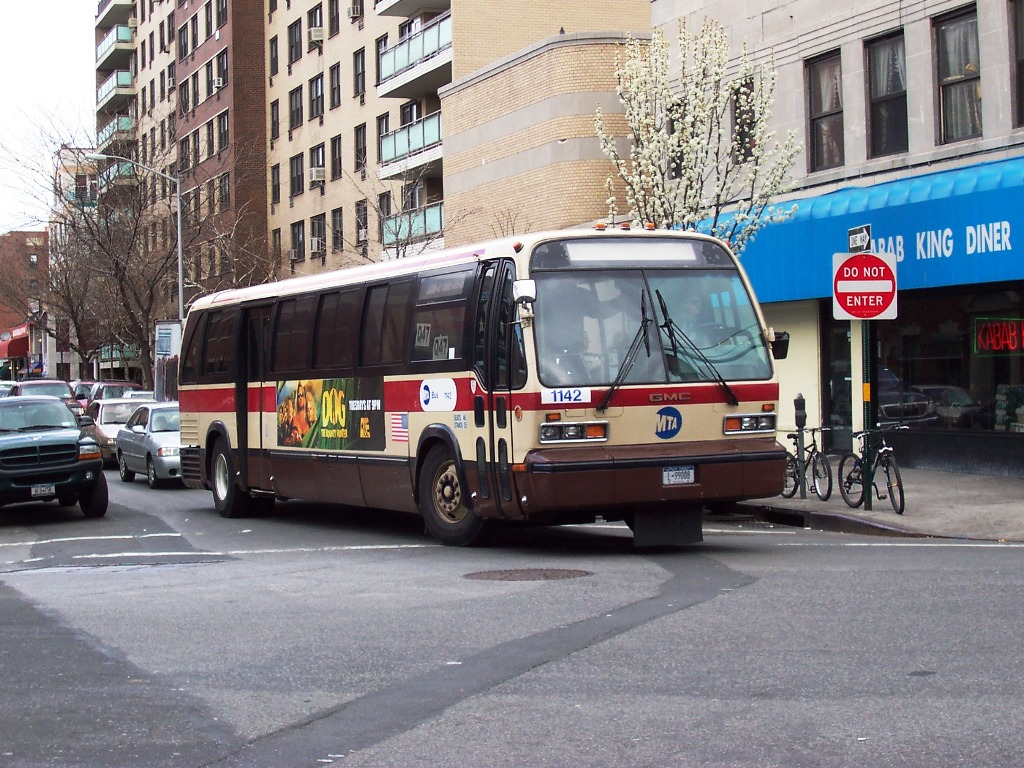
- Ex-Jamaica Bus #556 on MTA Bus's Q47 route in Jackson Heights.
- Parent: GTJ Reit Incorporated
- Founded: 1930
- Defunct: 2006
- Headquarters: 114-15 Guy R. Brewer Boulevard; South Jamaica, NY 11434-1296

Jamaica Buses, Inc., also known as Jamaica Bus Lines or the Jamaica Bus Company, was a bus company in New York City, New York, operating local service in Queens and express service to Manhattan until January 30, 2006, when the MTA Bus Company took over its operations.

The president of Jamaica Buses, and GTJ Reit Inc. was the late Jerome Cooper (August 14, 1928 – May 20, 2015, aged 86). Its facility was located on 114-15 Guy R. Brewer Boulevard in South Jamaica, Queens.

From 1954 to 1995, Jamaica Buses, also provided charter services.

== History ==
After the bankruptcy of the Long Island Electric Railway in 1926, the company's trolley lines in Nassau County were disestablished, however the ones in Queens survived, and the company was reorganized as the Jamaica Central Railways. This company would continue to operate streetcars for another six years. Upon reestablishment, the company purchased used trolley cars from companies such as the Empire State Railroad of Oswego, and the New York and Stamford Railway. Many of these cars dated back as far as 1911 and proved to be defective when used on the Far Rockaway Line. The conditions became so dangerous that by the Summer of 1930 the New York State Public Service Commission intervened and demanded that they trade the cars in for those from the Eastern Massachusetts Street Railway. Unfortunately, those cars proved to be inadequate, and that line was eventually abandoned. Cars on other lines inherited from the LIER did not suffer such misfortunes.

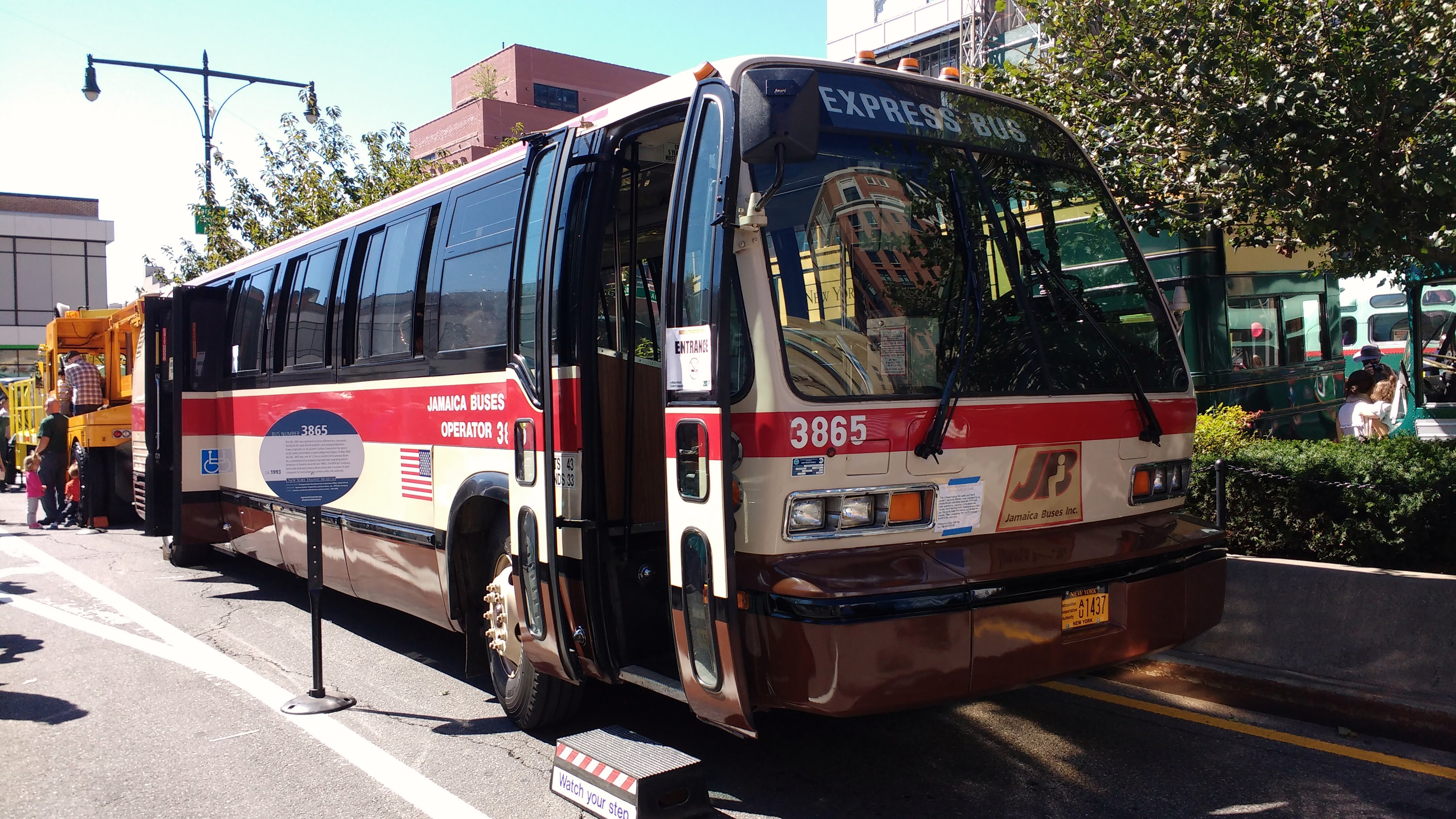
3865 is preserved in the museum fleet

In 1930, the City of New York granted the company a bus franchise service named Jamaica Buses, a subsidiary of Jamaica Central Railways. Bus operation over all the former JCR trolley lines began on November 12, 1933; this coincided with the widening of Jamaica Avenue, and the removal of the trolley tracks on the former routes. The company was acquired by the stockholders of Green Bus Lines in April 1949 after financial troubles, but also continued to operate independently. The change in ownership took effect on April 13, 1949, with Green Lines paying $200,000. In 1971 the QM21 express route to Manhattan was initiated.

== Bus routes ==
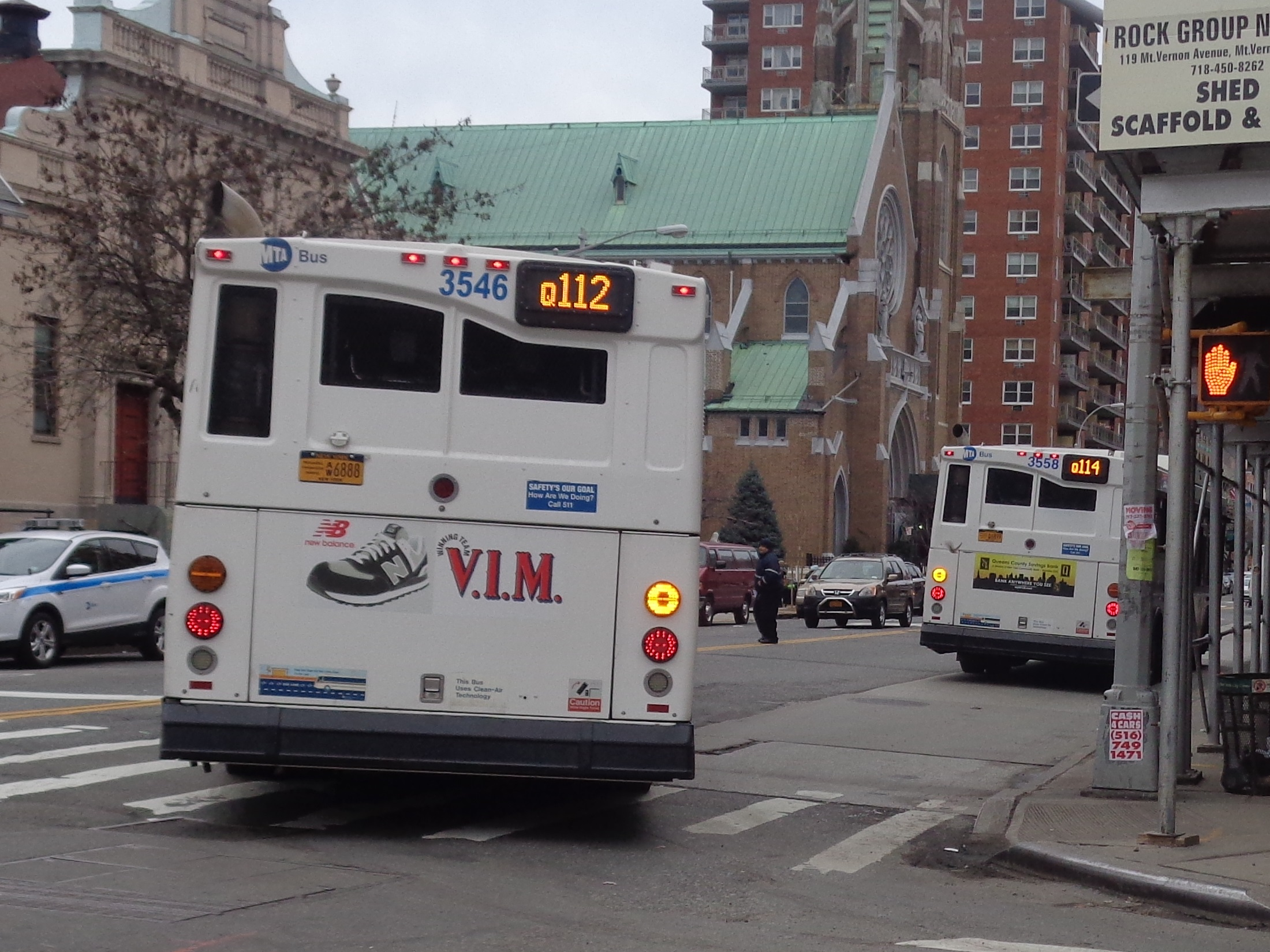
Two former Jamaica Bus services, the Q112 (left) and Q114 (right; formerly the Q113 local), at Parsons Boulevard in Jamaica.

Just prior to MTA Bus takeover, Jamaica Buses operated on the following routes that are now based in Baisley Park Bus Depot, the former company facility. All four local routes shared a northern terminal in Jamaica, Queens at the Parsons Boulevard subway station at Hillside Avenue. Old route designations can also be found in the local routes.

| Route (Former) | Terminal A | Major streets of travel | Terminal B | Notes |
Queens Local
| Q110 (A) | Jamaica; 88th Avenue and Parsons Boulevard at Parsons Boulevard ( E F <F> trains) or 179th Street and Hillside Avenue at Jamaica – 179th Street ( E F <F> trains) | Jamaica Avenue, Hempstead Avenue | Elmont; Belmont Park | Original Jamaica terminus was 168th Street station, the former terminus of the surface line.; 179th Street trips discontinued; rerouted from Hempstead Avenue to Floral Park via Jamaica Avenue in 2025. |
| Q111 (B) | Jamaica; 88th Avenue and Parsons Boulevard at Parsons Boulevard ( E F <F> trains) | Guy R. Brewer Boulevard | Rosedale; 147th Avenue/Hook Creek Boulevard: or -; Cedarhurst; Peninsula Boulevard/Rockaway Turnpike | Full route rebranded to “Rush”; short-turns to Farmers Boulevard relabeled to Q115 in 2025. |
| Q112 (C) | Jamaica; 88th Avenue and Parsons Boulevard at Parsons Boulevard ( E F <F> trains) | South Road, Liberty Avenue | Ozone Park; Rockaway Boulevard/98th Street at Rockaway Boulevard ( A train) | Original Jamaica terminus was 168th Street station on the BMT Jamaica Line.; Extended to East New York via Sutter/Pitkin Avenues in 2025. |
| Q113 (B); (D) | Jamaica; 88th Avenue and Parsons Boulevard at Parsons Boulevard ( E F <F> trains) | Guy R. Brewer Boulevard, Rockaway Boulevard, Central Avenue, Beach 9th Street | Far Rockaway; Seagirt Boulevard and Beach 20th Street | Original Jamaica terminus was at 168th Street station on the BMT Jamaica Line.; Original Far Rockaway terminus was at the Far Rockaway LIRR station (site of the current subway station).; Q113 local split off into Q114 in August 2014. Q114 converted from Limited Route to Rush route in June 2025. |
Queens-Manhattan express
| QM21 | Gramercy Park | Manhattan: 23rd Street, Madison Avenue, 57th Street; Queens: Queens Boulevard, Linden Boulevard, Guy R. Brewer Boulevard | Rochdale Village Loop | Manhattan Express |
