= Long Island Electric Railway =

Former New York City street railway company

The Long Island Electric Railway was a streetcar company operating in Brooklyn, Queens, and Nassau County, New York, United States between 1894 and 1926. The company was partially owned by the Long Island Consolidated Electric Companies, a holding company for the Long Island Rail Road and partially by August Belmont and the Interborough Rapid Transit Company. It connected the east end of the Fulton Street El at Crescent Street station in City Line, Brooklyn with Jamaica, Queens, and ran from there to the Nassau County line at Queens Village and to Far Rockaway, Queens via Nassau County. It also had a connection to Belmont Park. The New York and Long Island Traction Company used trackage rights over its line from Crescent Street to Queens Village.

Both Long Island Electric and the New York and Long Island Traction Companies went bankrupt in 1926, following a fire that destroyed the companies' barn facility in 1924. However while trolley service was no longer available for Nassau County, the LIER was reorganized and reestablished as the Jamaica Central Railways, which ran both buses and trolleys for the next six years, and buses exclusively for the rest of the 20th Century as Jamaica Buses until it was acquired by the MTA Bus Company in 2006.
