= Ninth Street station (BMT Fifth Avenue Line) =

New York City Subway station in Brooklyn (closed 1940)

Ninth St.

General information
- Location: 5th Avenue and 9th Street; Park Slope, Brooklyn, New York
- Coordinates: 40°40′9.01″N 73°59′10.68″W
- Line: BMT Fifth Avenue Line
- Platforms: 1 island platform
- Tracks: 2

Construction
- Structure type: Elevated

History
- Opened: August 15, 1889; 137 years ago
- Closed: May 31, 1940; 86 years ago

Former services
Preceding station	BMT Lines	Following station
Atlantic Avenue toward Sands Street	5: Culver "L" service Express	36th Street toward Stillwell Avenue
Third Street toward Sands Street	5: Culver "L" service Local	16th Street toward Stillwell Avenue
Third Street toward Sands Street	6: Fifth Avenue–Bay Ridge	16th Street toward 65th Street
Location

The Ninth Street station was a station on the demolished section of the BMT Fifth Avenue Line in Brooklyn, New York City. Served by trains of the BMT Culver Line and BMT Fifth Avenue Line, and had 2 tracks and 1 island platform. The station was opened on August 15, 1889, at the intersection of Fifth Avenue and Ninth Street and had connections to the Smith and Ninth Streets Line and Hamilton Avenue Line streetcars. The next stop to the north was Third Street. The next stop to the south was 16th Street. It closed on May 31, 1940.
