= 25th Street station (BMT Fifth Avenue Line) =

New York City Subway station in Brooklyn (closed 1940)

25th St.

General information
- Location: 5th Avenue and 25th Street; Greenwood Heights, Brooklyn, New York
- Coordinates: 40°39′32.77″N 73°59′44.75″W
- Line: BMT Fifth Avenue Line
- Platforms: 1 island platform
- Tracks: 2

Construction
- Structure type: Elevated

History
- Opened: August 15, 1889; 137 years ago
- Closed: May 31, 1940; 86 years ago

Former services
Preceding station	BMT Lines	Following station
20th Street toward Sands Street	5: Culver "L" Service; Local	36th Street toward Stillwell Avenue
20th Street toward Sands Street	6: Fifth Avenue–Bay Ridge	36th Street toward 65th Street
Location

The 25th Street station was a station on the now demolished BMT Fifth Avenue Line in Brooklyn, New York City. It was served by trains of the BMT Culver Line and BMT Fifth Avenue Line. It had two tracks and one island platform. The station was opened on August 15, 1889, at Fifth Avenue and 25th Street, and was the southern terminus of the line until 1890. The next stop to the north was 20th Street. The next stop to the south was 36th Street. The station closed on May 31, 1940. Current rapid transit service in this area can be found one block west at the 25th Street station on the underground BMT Fourth Avenue Line.
