= Third Street station (BMT Fifth Avenue Line) =

Third St.

General information
- Location: 5th Avenue and 3rd Street; Park Slope, Brooklyn, New York
- Coordinates: 40°40′22.04″N 73°58′59.85″W
- Line: BMT Fifth Avenue Line
- Platforms: 1 island platform
- Tracks: 2

Construction
- Structure type: Elevated

History
- Opened: June 22, 1889; 137 years ago
- Closed: May 31, 1940; 86 years ago

Former services
Preceding station	BMT Lines	Following station
Union Street toward Sands Street	5: Culver "L" service Local	Ninth Street toward Stillwell Avenue
Union Street toward Sands Street	6: Fifth Avenue–Bay Ridge	Ninth Street toward 65th Street
Location

The Third Street station was a station on the demolished section of the BMT Fifth Avenue Line in Brooklyn, New York City. Served by trains of the BMT Culver Line and BMT Fifth Avenue Line, and had 2 tracks and 1 island platform. The station was opened on June 22, 1889, at the intersection of Fifth Avenue and Third Street. The next stop to the north was Union Street. The next stop to the south was Ninth Street. It closed on May 31, 1940.

This station served Washington Park, the home of the National League Brooklyn Dodgers prior to Ebbets Field, and the Federal League's Brooklyn Tip-Tops.
