= 16th Street station (BMT Fifth Avenue Line) =

New York City Subway station in Brooklyn (closed 1940)

16th St.

General information
- Location: 5th Avenue and 16th Street; Park Slope, Brooklyn, New York
- Coordinates: 40°39′53.8″N 73°59′23.48″W
- Line: BMT Fifth Avenue Line
- Platforms: 1 island platform
- Tracks: 2

Construction
- Structure type: Elevated

History
- Opened: August 15, 1889; 137 years ago
- Closed: May 31, 1940; 86 years ago

Former services
Preceding station	BMT Lines	Following station
Ninth Street toward Sands Street	5: Culver "L" service Local	20th Street toward Stillwell Avenue
Ninth Street toward Sands Street	6: Fifth Avenue–Bay Ridge	20th Street toward 65th Street
Location

The 16th Street station was a station on the demolished section of the BMT Fifth Avenue Line in Brooklyn, New York City. It was served by trains of the BMT Culver Line and BMT Fifth Avenue Line and had 2 tracks and 1 island platform. The station was built on August 15, 1889, at the intersection of Fifth Avenue and 16th Street, and had a connection to the 15th Street Line trolleys. The next stop to the north was Ninth Street. The next stop to the south was 20th Street. It closed on May 31, 1940.
