= Fulton Street station (BMT Fifth Avenue Line) =

Railway station in Brooklyn, New York City

Fulton St.

General information
- Location: Hudson Avenue and Fulton Street; Downtown Brooklyn, Brooklyn, New York
- Coordinates: 40°41′19.15″N 73°58′49.03″W
- Line: BMT Fifth Avenue Line
- Platforms: 1 island platforms
- Tracks: 2

Construction
- Structure type: Elevated

History
- Opened: July 27, 1889; 137 years ago
- Closed: May 31, 1940; 86 years ago

Former services
Preceding station	BMT Lines	Following station
Bridge Street toward Sands Street	5: Culver "L" service Local	Atlantic Avenue toward Stillwell Avenue
Bridge Street toward Sands Street	6: Fifth Avenue–Bay Ridge	Atlantic Avenue toward 65th Street
Location

The Fulton Street station was a station on the demolished section of the BMT Fifth Avenue Line in Brooklyn, New York City. Served by trains of the BMT Culver Line and BMT Fifth Avenue Line, it had two tracks and one island platform. The station was opened on July 27, 1889, at Hudson Avenue and Fulton Street, and was the northernmost Fifth Avenue Line station before the line merged with the BMT Myrtle Avenue Line. It also had connections to the Fulton Street, DeKalb Avenue, and Flatbush Avenue Line streetcars. The next stop to the north was Bridge–Jay Streets. The next stop to the south was Atlantic Avenue, which still exists today as the Atlantic Avenue–Barclays Center subway station complex. It closed on May 31, 1940.
