= 40th Street station (BMT Fifth Avenue Line) =

New York City Subway station in Brooklyn (closed 1940)

40th St.
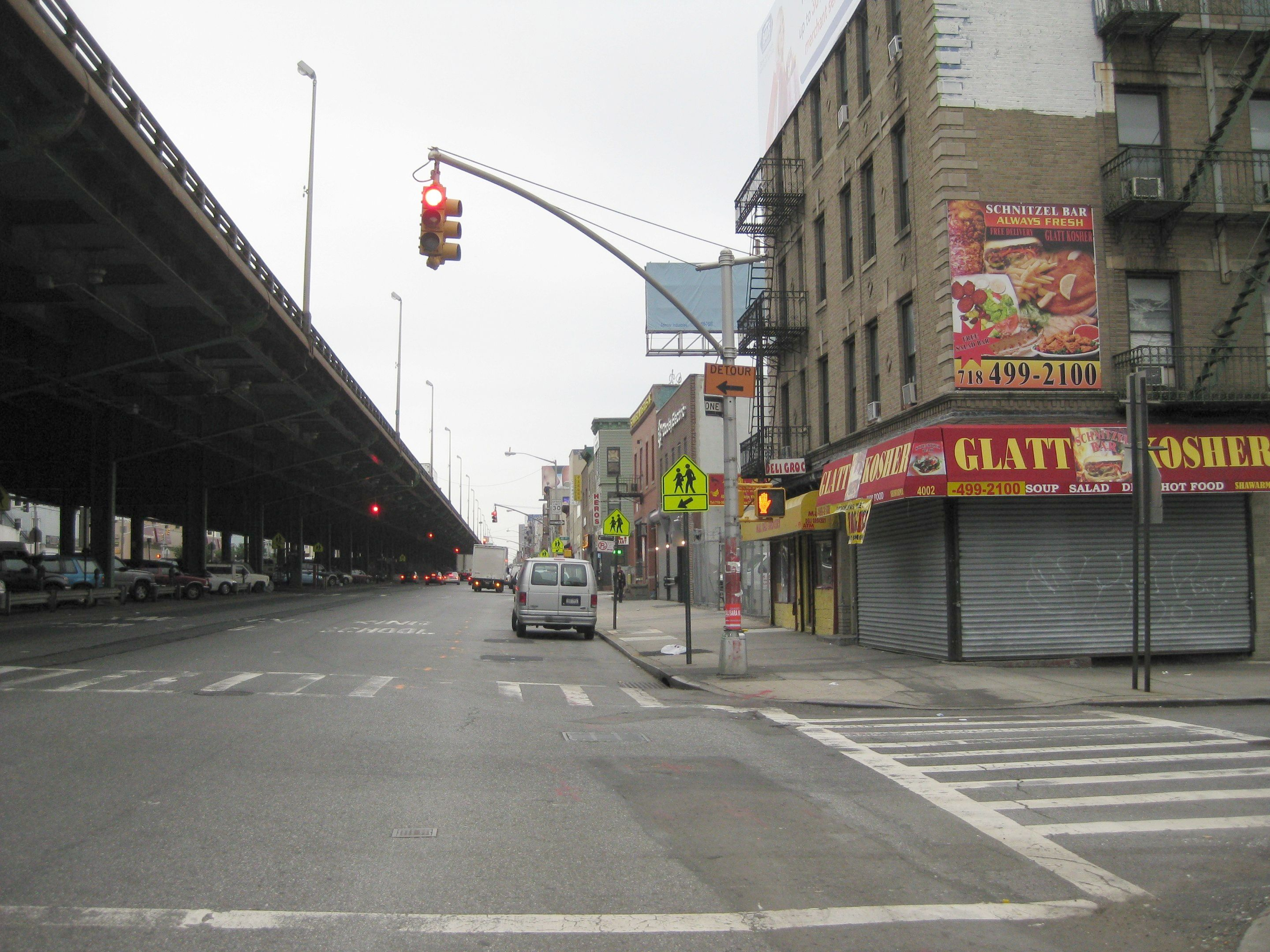
- Gowanus Expressway on the pillars of the former station

General information
- Location: 3rd Avenue and 40th Street; Sunset Park, Brooklyn, New York
- Coordinates: 40°39′11.22″N 74°0′33.18″W
- Line: BMT Fifth Avenue Line
- Platforms: 1 island platform
- Tracks: 2

Construction
- Structure type: Elevated

History
- Opened: October 1, 1893; 132 years ago
- Closed: May 31, 1940; 86 years ago

Former services
Preceding station	BMT Lines	Following station
36th Street toward Sands Street	6: Fifth Avenue–Bay Ridge	46th Street toward 65th Street
Location

The 40th Street station was a station on the now demolished BMT Fifth Avenue Line in Brooklyn, New York City. It was served by trains of the BMT Fifth Avenue Line. It had two tracks and one island platform. The station was built on October 1, 1893, and despite the name of the line was actually located on Third Avenue and 40th Street. It was the northernmost station on Third Avenue before the line shifted to the street that bore its name. The station had connections to four streetcar lines; The Church Avenue Line, 39th Street and Coney Island Line, 39th Street and Manhattan Beach Line, and 39th Street and Ulmer Park Line. The next stop to the north was 36th Street. The next stop to the south was 46th Street. The station closed on May 31, 1940.
