= Union Street station (BMT Fifth Avenue Line) =

Union St.

General information
- Location: 5th Avenue and Union Street; Park Slope, Brooklyn, New York
- Coordinates: 40°40′35.07″N 73°58′49.67″W
- Line: BMT Fifth Avenue Line
- Platforms: 2 side platforms
- Tracks: 2

Construction
- Structure type: Elevated

History
- Opened: June 22, 1889; 137 years ago
- Closed: May 31, 1940; 86 years ago

Former services
Preceding station	BMT Lines	Following station
St. Marks Avenue toward Sands Street	5: Culver "L" service Local	Third Street toward Stillwell Avenue
St. Marks Avenue toward Sands Street	6: Fifth Avenue–Bay Ridge	Third Street toward 65th Street
Location

The Union Street station was a station on the demolished section of the BMT Fifth Avenue Line in Brooklyn, New York City. Served by trains of the BMT Culver Line and BMT Fifth Avenue Line, it had 2 tracks and 2 side platforms. The station was opened on June 22, 1889, at the intersection of Fifth Avenue and Union Street, and had a connection to the Union Street Line trolleys. The next stop to the north was Saint Marks Avenue. The next stop to the south was Third Street. It closed on May 31, 1940.
