= 52nd Street station (BMT Fifth Avenue Line) =

New York City Subway station in Brooklyn (closed 1940)

52nd St.

General information
- Location: 3rd Avenue and 52nd Street; Sunset Park, Brooklyn, New York
- Coordinates: 40°38′47.95″N 74°0′57.32″W
- Line: BMT Fifth Avenue Line
- Platforms: 1 island platform
- Tracks: 2

Construction
- Structure type: Elevated

History
- Opened: October 1, 1893; 132 years ago
- Closed: May 31, 1940; 86 years ago

Former services
Preceding station	BMT Lines	Following station
46th Street toward Sands Street	6: Fifth Avenue–Bay Ridge	58th Street toward 65th Street
Location

The 52nd Street station was a station on the demolished section of the BMT Fifth Avenue Line in Brooklyn, New York City. It was served by trains of the BMT Fifth Avenue Line, it had 2 tracks and 1 island platform. The station was opened on October 1, 1893, at the intersection of Third Avenue and 52nd Street. The next stop to the north was 46th Street. The next stop to the south was 58th Street. It closed on May 31, 1940. Current rapid transit service in this area can be found one block east and then another block south at the 53rd Street station on the underground BMT Fourth Avenue Line.
