= 46th Street station (BMT Fifth Avenue Line) =

New York City Subway station in Brooklyn (closed 1940)

46th St.
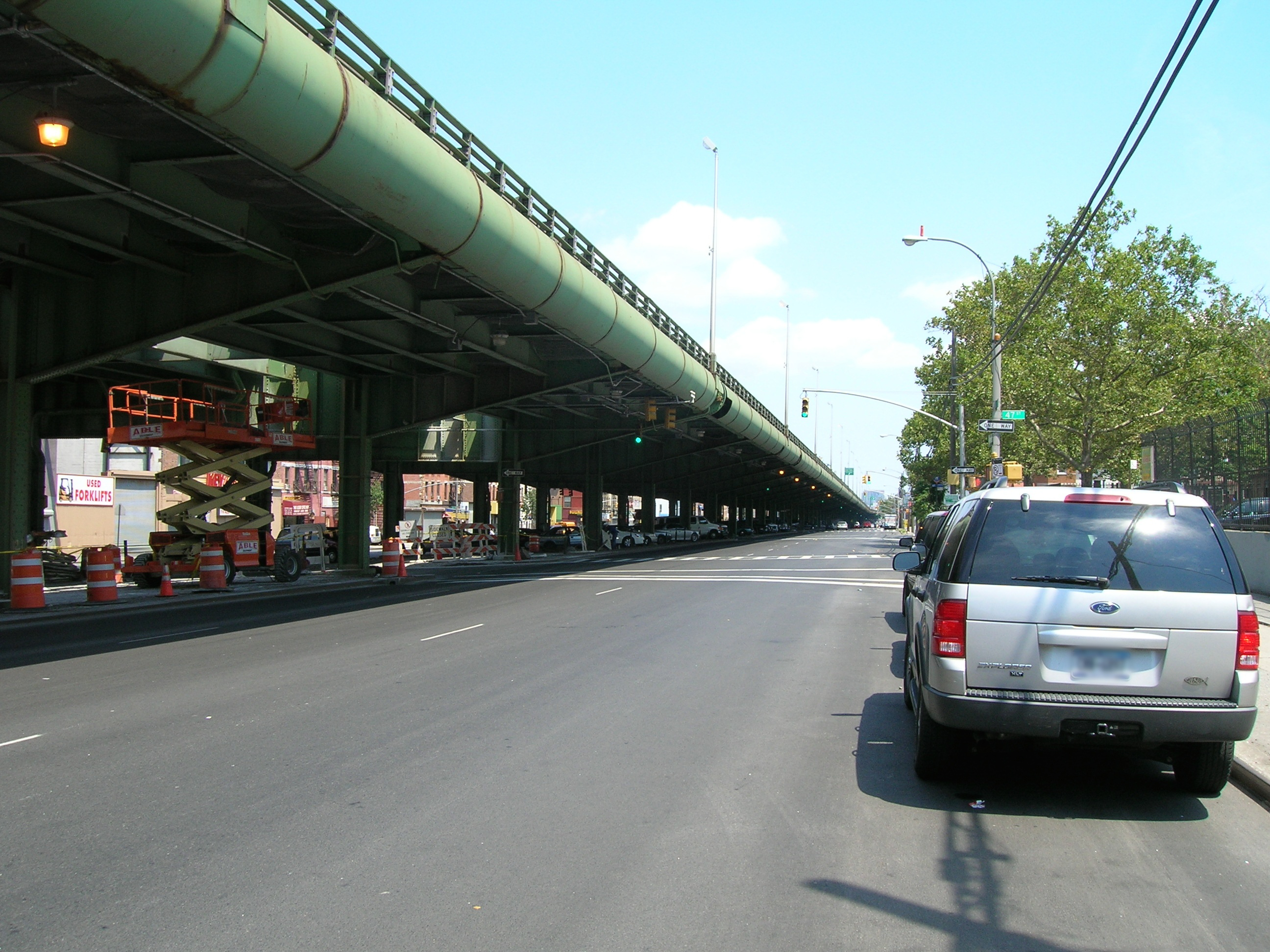
- Gowanus Expressway on the pillars of the former station

General information
- Location: 3rd Avenue and 46th Street; Sunset Park, Brooklyn, New York
- Coordinates: 40°38′59.25″N 74°0′45.71″W
- Line: BMT Fifth Avenue Line
- Platforms: 1 island platform
- Tracks: 2

Construction
- Structure type: Elevated

History
- Opened: October 1, 1893; 132 years ago
- Closed: May 31, 1940; 86 years ago

Former services
Preceding station	BMT Lines	Following station
40th Street toward Sands Street	6: Fifth Avenue–Bay Ridge	52nd Street toward 65th Street
Location

The 46th Street station was a station on the demolished BMT Fifth Avenue Line. It was served by trains of the BMT Fifth Avenue Line in Brooklyn, New York City. It had 2 tracks and 1 island platform. The station was built on October 1, 1893, and despite the name of the line was actually located on Third Avenue and 46th Street. The next stop to the north was 40th Street. The next stop to the south was 52nd Street. It closed on May 31, 1940. Current rapid transit service in this area can be found one block east and then another block north at the 45th Street station on the underground BMT Fourth Avenue Line.
