= St. Marks Avenue station =

St. Marks Ave.

General information
- Location: 5th Avenue and St. Marks Place; Park Slope, Brooklyn, New York
- Coordinates: 40°40′51.04″N 73°58′38.85″W
- Line: BMT Fifth Avenue Line
- Platforms: 2 side platforms
- Tracks: 2

Construction
- Structure type: Elevated

History
- Opened: June 22, 1889; 137 years ago
- Closed: May 31, 1940; 86 years ago

Former services
Preceding station	BMT Lines	Following station
Atlantic Avenue toward Sands Street	5: Culver "L" service Local	Union Street toward Stillwell Avenue
Atlantic Avenue toward Sands Street	6: Fifth Avenue–Bay Ridge	Union Street toward 65th Street
Location

The St. Marks Avenue station was a station on the demolished section of the BMT Fifth Avenue Line in Brooklyn, New York City. Served by trains of the BMT Culver Line and BMT Fifth Avenue Line, it had 2 tracks and 2 side platforms. The station was opened on June 22, 1889, at Fifth Avenue and St. Marks Place, which is renamed St. Marks Avenue east of Fifth Avenue. It also had a connection to the Bergen Street Line trolleys. It closed on May 31, 1940.
