= 20th Street station (BMT Fifth Avenue Line) =

New York City Subway station in Brooklyn (closed 1940)

20th St.

General information
- Location: 5th Avenue and 20th Street; Greenwood Heights/South Slope, Brooklyn, New York
- Coordinates: 40°39′42.85″N 73°59′34.22″W
- Line: BMT Fifth Avenue Line
- Platforms: 1 island platform
- Tracks: 2

Construction
- Structure type: Elevated

History
- Opened: August 15, 1889; 137 years ago
- Closed: May 31, 1940; 86 years ago

Former services
Preceding station	BMT Lines	Following station
16th Street toward Sands Street	5: Culver "L" service Local	25th Street toward Stillwell Avenue
16th Street toward Sands Street	6: Fifth Avenue–Bay Ridge	25th Street toward 65th Street
Location

The 20th Street station was a station on the demolished section of the BMT Fifth Avenue Line in Brooklyn, New York City. It was served by trains of the BMT Culver Line and BMT Fifth Avenue Line, and had 2 tracks and 1 island platform. The station was built on August 15, 1889, at the intersection of Fifth Avenue and 20th Street. The next stop to the north was 16th Street. The next stop to the south was 25th Street. It closed on May 31, 1940.
