= 36th Street station (BMT Fifth Avenue Line) =

New York City Subway station in Brooklyn (closed 1940)

36th St.

General information
- Location: 5th Avenue and 36th Street; Greenwood Heights, Brooklyn, New York
- Coordinates: 40°39′10.42″N 74°0′7.88″W
- Lines: BMT Fifth Avenue Line; BMT Culver Line
- Platforms: 2 island platforms
- Tracks: 4

Construction
- Structure type: Elevated

History
- Opened: May 29, 1890; 136 years ago
- Closed: May 31, 1940; 86 years ago

Former services
Preceding station	BMT Lines	Following station
Ninth Street Express toward Sands Street	5: Culver "L" service	Ninth Avenue toward Stillwell Avenue
25th Street Local toward Sands Street	5: Culver "L" service	Ninth Avenue toward Stillwell Avenue
25th Street toward Sands Street	6: Fifth Avenue–Bay Ridge	40th Street toward 65th Street
Location

The 36th Street station was a station on the demolished section of the BMT Fifth Avenue Line in Brooklyn, New York City. It was served by trains of the BMT Culver Line and BMT Fifth Avenue Line. It had four tracks and two island platforms. The station was opened on May 29, 1890, and was the southern terminus of the Fifth Avenue Line until 1893, as well as the southernmost station to be installed along Fifth Avenue itself. Stations built beyond this point were located along Third Avenue, and the line was sometimes called the BMT Third Avenue Line south of here. The next stop to the north was 25th Street. The next stop to the south was Ninth Avenue for Culver Line trains and 40th Street for Fifth Avenue Line trains. Ninth Avenue station still exists today exclusively for the BMT West End Line. The station closed on May 31, 1940. Current rapid transit service in this area can be found one block west at the 36th Street station on the underground BMT Fourth Avenue Line.
