= 58th Street station (BMT Fifth Avenue Line) =

Railway station in New York City

58th St.

General information
- Location: 3rd Avenue and 58th Street; Sunset Park, Brooklyn, New York
- Coordinates: 40°38′35.79″N 74°1′9.87″W
- Line: BMT Fifth Avenue Line
- Platforms: 1 island platform
- Tracks: 2

Construction
- Structure type: Elevated

History
- Opened: October 1, 1893; 132 years ago
- Closed: May 31, 1940; 86 years ago

Former services
Preceding station	BMT Lines	Following station
52nd Street toward Sands Street	6: Fifth Avenue–Bay Ridge	65th Street Terminus
Location

The 58th Street station was the penultimate station on the demolished section of the BMT Fifth Avenue Line in Brooklyn, New York City. It was served by trains of the BMT Fifth Avenue Line, and had two tracks and one island platform. The station was built on October 1, 1893. The next stop to the north was 52nd Street. The next stop to the south was the 65th Street Terminal. It closed on May 31, 1940. Current rapid transit service in this area can be found one block east and then another block south at the 59th Street station on the underground BMT Fourth Avenue Line and BMT Sea Beach Line.
