= Third Avenue Elevated =

Third Avenue Elevated refers to the following elevated railways:

- The defunct IRT Third Avenue Line in Manhattan and the Bronx, New York City
- The defunct BMT Third Avenue Line in Brooklyn, New York City
