= Bay Ridge Line =

Bay Ridge Line refers to the following transit lines:

- Bay Ridge Branch (Long Island Rail Road freight)
- Bay Ridge Line (surface) (bus, formerly streetcar), see Fifth Avenue Line (Brooklyn elevated)
