= 20th Street station =

20th Street station may refer to:

- Right Of Way/20th Street station, on the San Francisco Municipal Railway light rail network's J Church line
- 20th Street station (Muni Metro), a light rail stop on the Muni Metro T Third Street line in Dogpatch, San Francisco
- 20th Street station (BMT Fifth Avenue Line), a defunct New York City Subway station
