= Adams Street station =

Adams St.

General information
- Location: Myrtle Avenue and Adams Street; Brooklyn Heights, Brooklyn, New York
- Coordinates: 40.693902°N 73.988694°W
- Operator: City of New York (from 1940)
- Line: Myrtle Avenue Line
- Platforms: 2 side platforms
- Tracks: 2

Construction
- Structure type: Elevated

History
- Opened: February 13, 1888; 138 years ago
- Closed: March 5, 1944; 82 years ago
- Former names: City Hall

Former services in 1939
Preceding station	BMT Lines	Following station
Sands Street Terminus	5: Culver "L" service	Bridge Street toward Stillwell Avenue
Sands Street Terminus	6: Fifth Avenue–Bay Ridge	Bridge Street toward 65th Street
Sands Street Terminus	11: Myrtle Avenue	Bridge Street toward Metropolitan Avenue
Sands Street toward Park Row	12: Lexington Avenue	Bridge Street toward Eastern Parkway
Location

The Adams Street station was a station on the demolished BMT Myrtle Avenue Line in Brooklyn, New York City. It had 2 tracks and 2 side platforms. It was opened on February 13, 1888, as "City Hall Station" and closed on March 5, 1944. The next stop to the south was Bridge–Jay Streets. The next stop to the north was Sands Street.
