= Third Avenue Line =

Third Avenue Line may refer to the following transit lines:

- IRT Third Avenue Line, commonly known as the Third Avenue El and the Bronx El, a former elevated railway in Manhattan and the Bronx, New York City; ended in Manhattan in 1955 and in the Bronx in 1973
- Third Avenue Elevated, the portion of Fifth Avenue Line (Brooklyn elevated) on Third Avenue, Brooklyn; closed in 1940
- Third Avenue Line, a former streetcar line in Brooklyn that closed in 1942, now served by bus; see List of bus routes in Brooklyn#Route history
- Third Avenue Line (Manhattan surface), a public transit line in Manhattan, running from Lower Manhattan to Fort George in Washington Heights, originally a streetcar line, now served by several bus routes
