= Atlantic–Pacific =

Atlantic–Pacific or Atlantic/Pacific may refer to:

- Atlantic Avenue–Barclays Center station, formerly Atlantic Avenue/Pacific Street station, in New York City
- A&P, the Great Atlantic & Pacific Tea Company
- Atlantic and Pacific Railroad
