= Atlantic Avenue–Barclays Center station =

New York City Subway station in Brooklyn

Atlantic Avenue–Barclays Center
- New York City Subway station complex
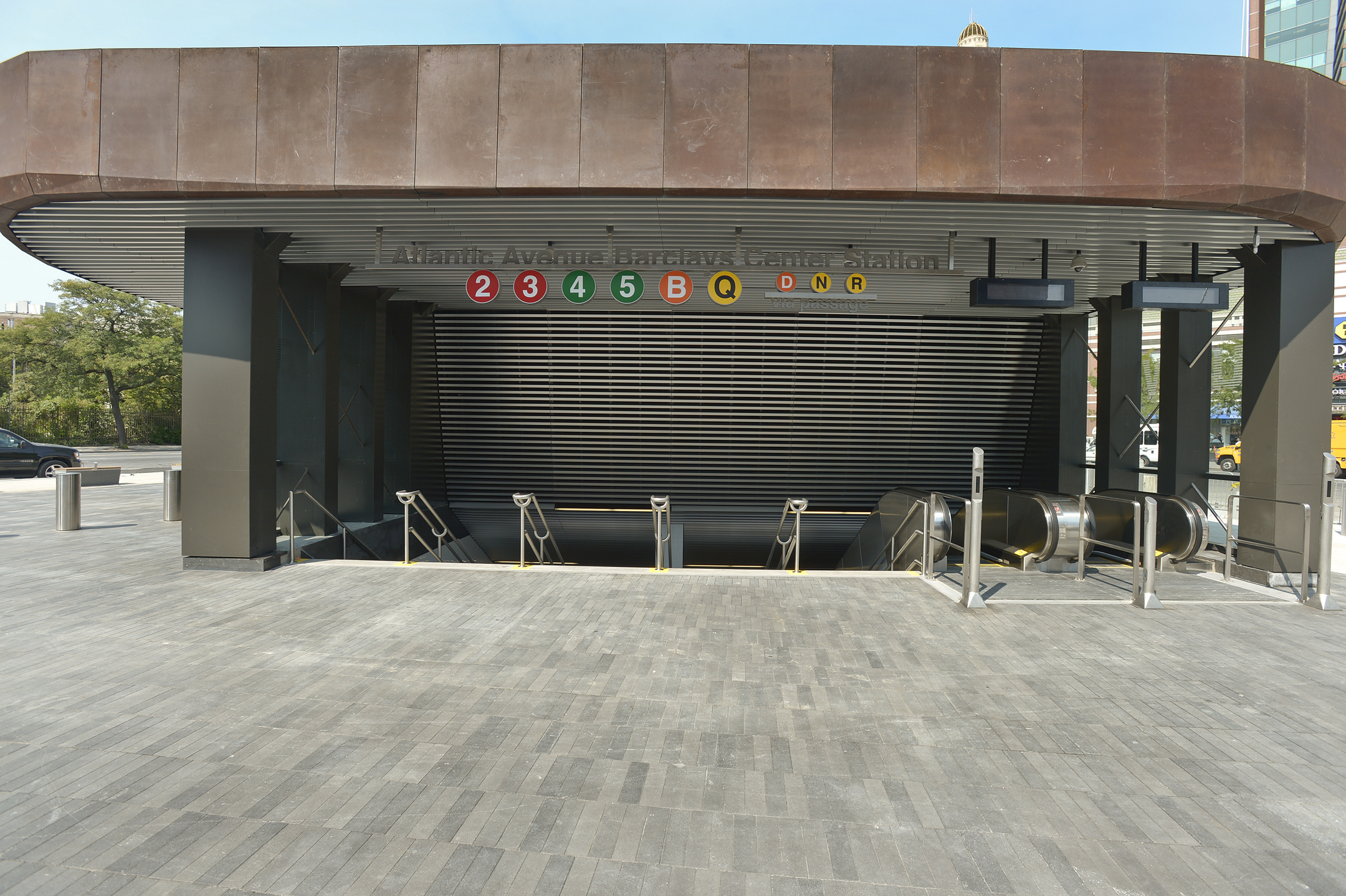
- Entrance from Barclays Center

Station statistics
- Address: Atlantic Avenue, Pacific Street, Flatbush Avenue & Fourth Avenue; Brooklyn, New York
- Borough: Brooklyn
- Locale: Boerum Hill, Fort Greene, Park Slope, Prospect Heights
- Coordinates: 40°41′04″N 73°58′42″W
- Division: A (IRT), B (BMT)
- Line: BMT Fourth Avenue Line; BMT Brighton Line; IRT Eastern Parkway Line
- Services: 2 (all times); 3 (all except late nights); 4 (all times); 5 (weekdays only); B (weekday rush hours, middays and early evenings); D (all times); N (all times); Q (all times); R (all times); W (limited rush hour service only)
- Transit: NYCT Bus: B37, B41, B45, B63, B65, B67; MTA Bus: B103; LIRR Atlantic Terminal
- Levels: 3

Other information
- Opened: November 26, 1967; 58 years ago (transfer between Brighton Line and Eastern Parkway Line); January 16, 1978; 48 years ago (transfer between Fourth Avenue Line and rest of complex)
- Accessible: Yes

Traffic
- 2025: 10,773,513 ▲6.9%
- Rank: 20 out of 423
Location
Location within New York City Subway
Location within New York City
Location within New York
Street map
Station service legend
Symbol	Description
Stops all times except late nights	Stops all times except late nights
Stops all times	Stops all times
Stops weekdays during the day	Stops weekdays during the day
Stops rush hours only	Stops rush hours only
Stops rush hours in the peak direction only	Stops rush hours in the peak direction only
- Atlantic Avenue Control House
- U.S. National Register of Historic Places
- MPS: Interborough Rapid Transit Subway Control Houses TR
- NRHP reference No.: 80002643
- Added to NRHP: May 6, 1980
- Atlantic Avenue Subway Station (IRT and BMT)
- U.S. National Register of Historic Places
- MPS: New York City Subway System MPS
- NRHP reference No.: 04001023
- Added to NRHP: September 17, 2004

The Atlantic Avenue–Barclays Center station (formerly Atlantic Avenue/Pacific Street station) is a major New York City Subway station complex shared by the BMT Fourth Avenue Line, the BMT Brighton Line and the IRT Eastern Parkway Line. Named after Atlantic Avenue and the Barclays Center arena, it is located at Fourth and Flatbush Avenues' intersections with Atlantic Avenue and Pacific Street in Brooklyn. The complex is served by the 2, 4, D, N, Q and R trains at all times; the 3 train at all times except late nights; the 5 and B trains on weekdays during the day; and a few rush-hour W trains.

The Eastern Parkway Line platforms at Atlantic Avenue were built for the Interborough Rapid Transit Company (IRT) as a terminal station on the city's first subway line, which opened on May 1, 1908. The Fourth Avenue Line platforms of the Brooklyn Rapid Transit Company (BRT; later Brooklyn–Manhattan Transit Corporation or BMT) opened in 1915 as the Pacific Street station. As part of the Dual Contracts, the Brighton Line platform at Atlantic Avenue opened in 1920, and the Eastern Parkway Line platforms were modified to accommodate local and express service. There was also a station on the elevated Fifth Avenue Line at Atlantic Avenue, which operated from 1888 to 1940 and was not connected to the subway complex. Several modifications have been made to the complex over the years, and all three stations were connected to each other within fare control by 1978. The complex was renovated in the early 2000s. The control house has been listed on the National Register of Historic Places since 1980, while the Brighton Line and Eastern Parkway Line stations have been listed on the National Register of Historic Places since 2004.

The Eastern Parkway Line station under Flatbush Avenue has two side platforms, one island platform, and four tracks, while the parallel Brighton Line station has one island platform and two tracks. The Fourth Avenue Line station, running to the west under Fourth Avenue, has two island platforms and four tracks. The platforms are connected to each other and to the Long Island Rail Road's (LIRR) Atlantic Terminal by several passageways. Numerous elevators make the complex compliant with the Americans with Disabilities Act of 1990 (ADA). The station also has connections to nearby buildings such as the Williamsburgh Savings Bank Tower and the Atlantic Terminal shopping mall. As of 2023, it is the busiest subway station in Brooklyn and the 20th busiest station in the system, with nearly 10 million passengers.

== History ==
=== Original subway ===
==== Construction ====
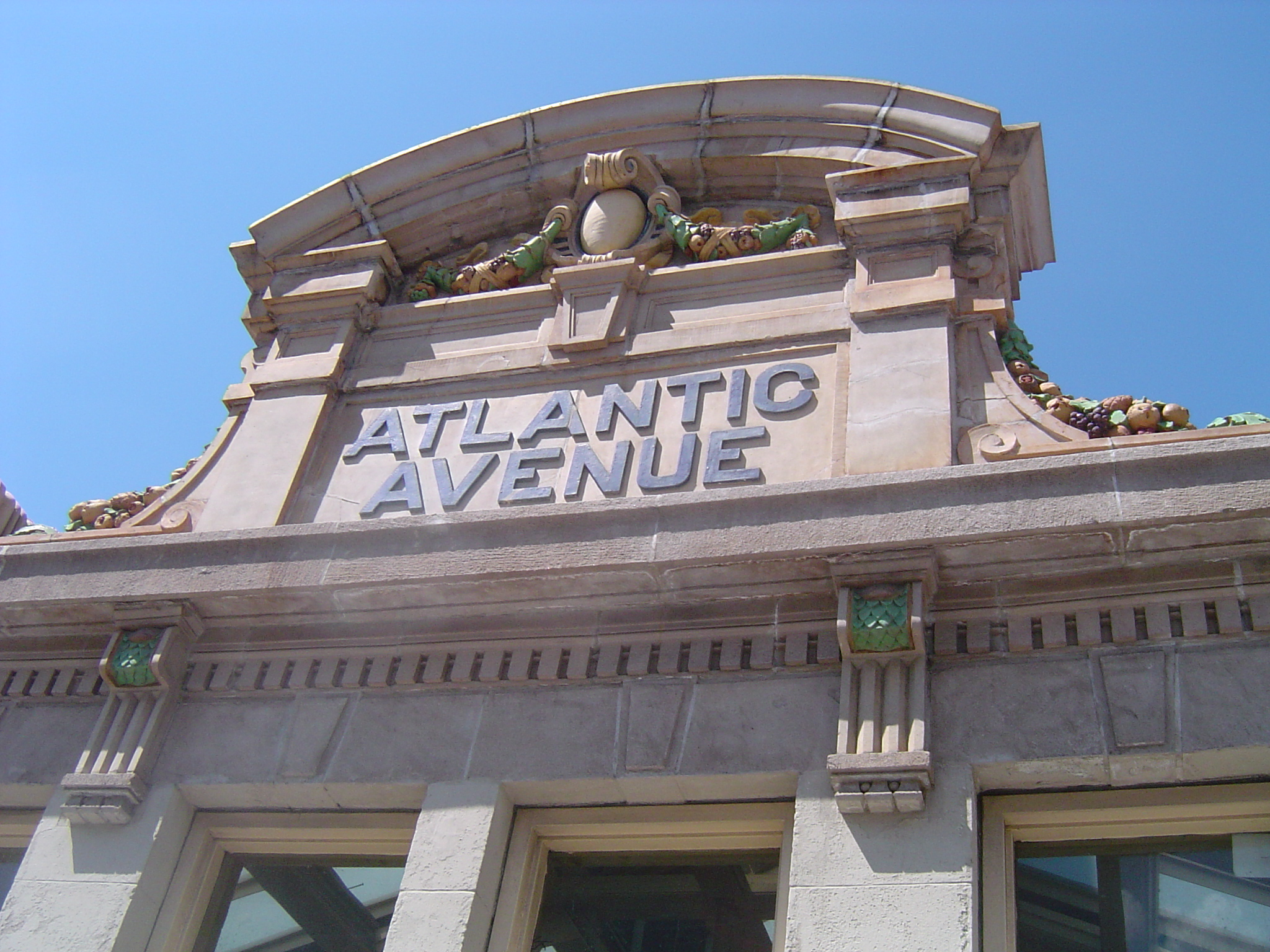
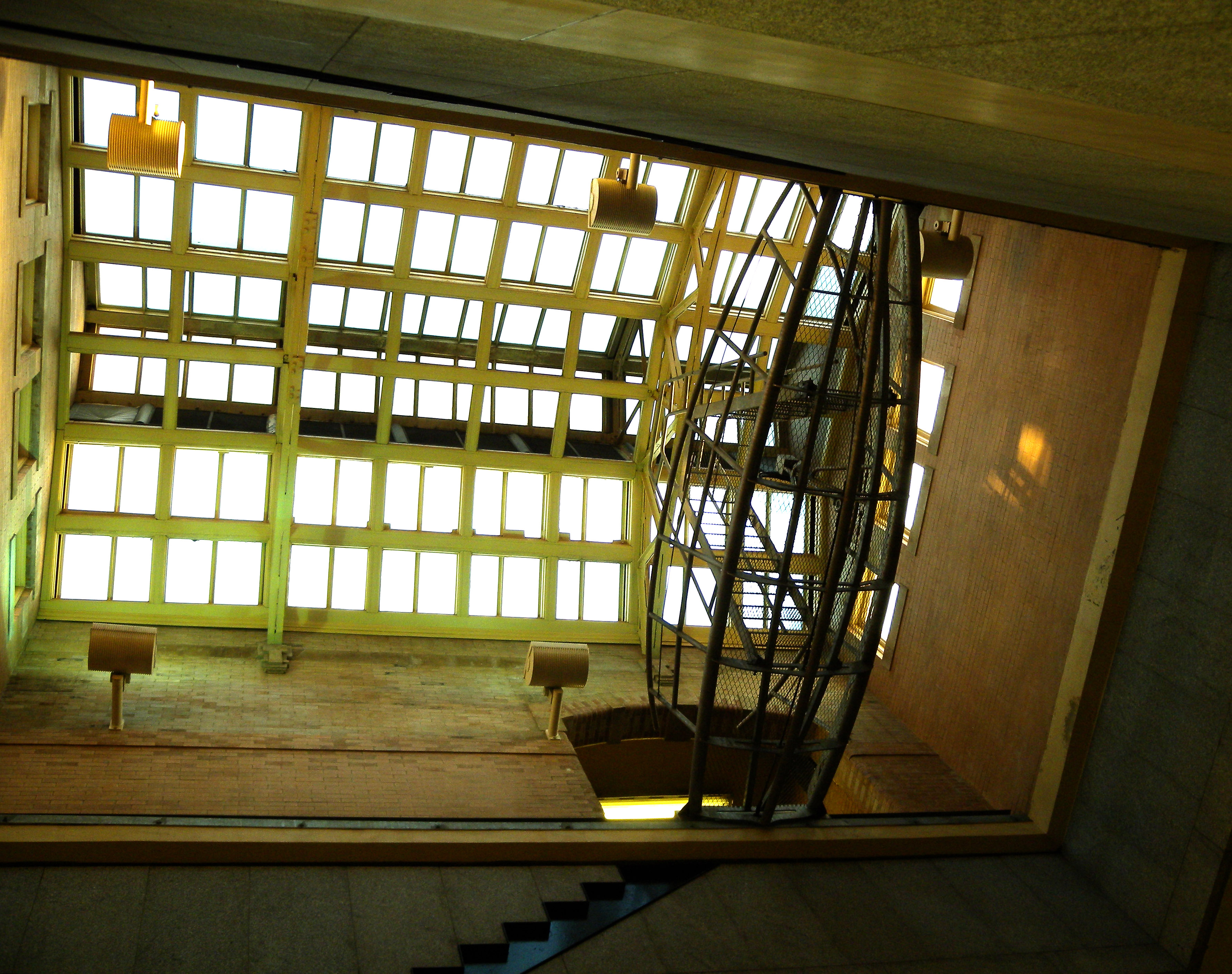
The landmarked Atlantic Avenue control house's exterior (top) and interior (bottom)

Planning for a subway line in New York City dates to 1864. However, development of what would become the city's first subway line did not start until 1894, when the New York State Legislature passed the Rapid Transit Act. The subway plans were drawn up by a team of engineers led by William Barclay Parsons, the Rapid Transit Commission's chief engineer. The Rapid Transit Construction Company, organized by John B. McDonald and funded by August Belmont Jr., signed the initial Contract 1 with the Rapid Transit Commission in February 1900, in which it would construct the subway and maintain a 50-year operating lease from the opening of the line. In 1901, the firm of Heins & LaFarge was hired to design the underground stations. Belmont incorporated the Interborough Rapid Transit Company (IRT) in April 1902 to operate the subway.

Several days after Contract 1 was signed, the Board of Rapid Transit Railroad Commissioners instructed Parsons to evaluate the feasibility of extending the subway south to South Ferry, and then to Brooklyn. On January 24, 1901, the Board adopted a route that would extend the subway from City Hall to the Long Island Rail Road (LIRR)'s Flatbush Avenue terminal station (now known as Atlantic Terminal) in Brooklyn, via the Joralemon Street Tunnel under the East River. Contract 2, which gave the IRT a 35-year lease, was executed between the commission and the Rapid Transit Construction Company on September 11, 1902. Work under Fulton Street and Flatbush Avenue in Brooklyn commenced in April 1904. The IRT line in Brooklyn had been proposed as a two-track line under Fulton Street, expanding to three tracks under Flatbush Avenue. Belmont submitted a revised proposal to the Rapid Transit Commission in April 1905 to widen the line to four tracks.

==== Opening ====
The Joralemon Street Tunnel opened in January 1908 between Lower Manhattan and a temporary terminus at Borough Hall, the first underground subway station in Brooklyn. The line was to extend three more stops to Atlantic Avenue; this extension was nearly complete by March, except for the Atlantic Avenue station. The extension opened on May 1, 1908; the first train, an express from Manhattan, left Bowling Green at 1:02 a.m. and entered Atlantic Avenue sixteen minutes later. The extension's opening was marked with a parade and a poem praising Belmont. According to The New York Times, the extension was "regarded as of the utmost importance" because it connected the IRT with the LIRR for the first time. The extension relieved congestion at the overcrowded Borough Hall station; trains from Atlantic Avenue were already crowded by the time they reached Borough Hall.

The Atlantic Avenue station originally had two tracks, with one island platform and two side platforms in a Spanish solution arrangement. Initially, the station was served by express trains along both the West Side (now the Broadway–Seventh Avenue Line to Van Cortlandt Park–242nd Street) and East Side (now the Lenox Avenue Line). Lenox local trains to 145th Street served the station during late nights. The Brooklyn Rapid Transit Company (BRT) extended its streetcar lines to the Atlantic Avenue station when the IRT extension opened. The LIRR and IRT also held discussions on the feasibility of running LIRR trains onto the IRT tracks to the Bronx, but this was not done because the LIRR did not have enough rolling stock.

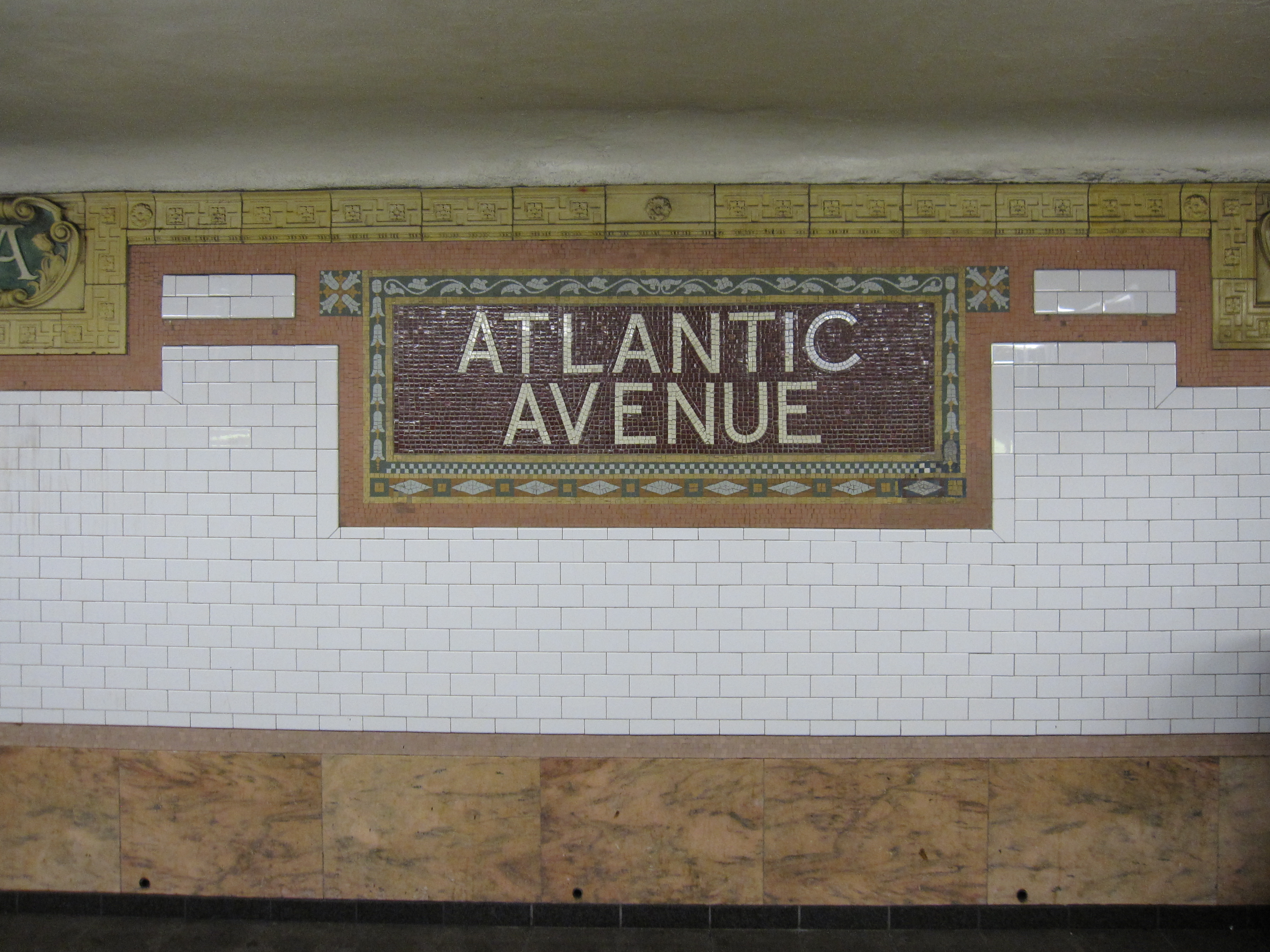
Tilework in original station

To address overcrowding, in 1909, the New York Public Service Commission proposed lengthening the platforms at stations along the original IRT subway. As part of a modification to the IRT's construction contracts made on January 18, 1910, the company was to lengthen station platforms to accommodate ten-car express and six-car local trains. In addition to $1.5 million (equivalent to $51.8 million in 2025) spent on platform lengthening, $500,000 (equivalent to $17.3 million in 2025) was spent on building additional entrances and exits. It was anticipated that these improvements would increase capacity by 25 percent. The island platform at the Atlantic Avenue station on the modern Eastern Parkway Line was extended 105 feet (32 m) to the east. On January 23 and 24, 1911, ten-car express trains began running.

=== Dual Contracts expansion ===
After the original IRT opened, the city began planning new lines. As early as 1903, Parsons had proposed constructing a four-track extension of the IRT line under Flatbush Avenue, running southeast from Atlantic Avenue to Grand Army Plaza; from there, two branches would have extended south to Flatbush and east to Brownsville. This plan did not progress for a decade due to various disputes over the original subway. Nonetheless, the Atlantic Avenue station was never intended as the permanent terminus of the line, and various proposals for extensions and spurs were put forth. In 1908, the IRT unsuccessfully proposed a two-track subway line across the Manhattan Bridge to Canal Street in Manhattan; this line would have used the outer tracks at the Atlantic Avenue and Nevins Street stations, then diverged from the original line to cross the Manhattan Bridge.

==== Fourth Avenue Line ====
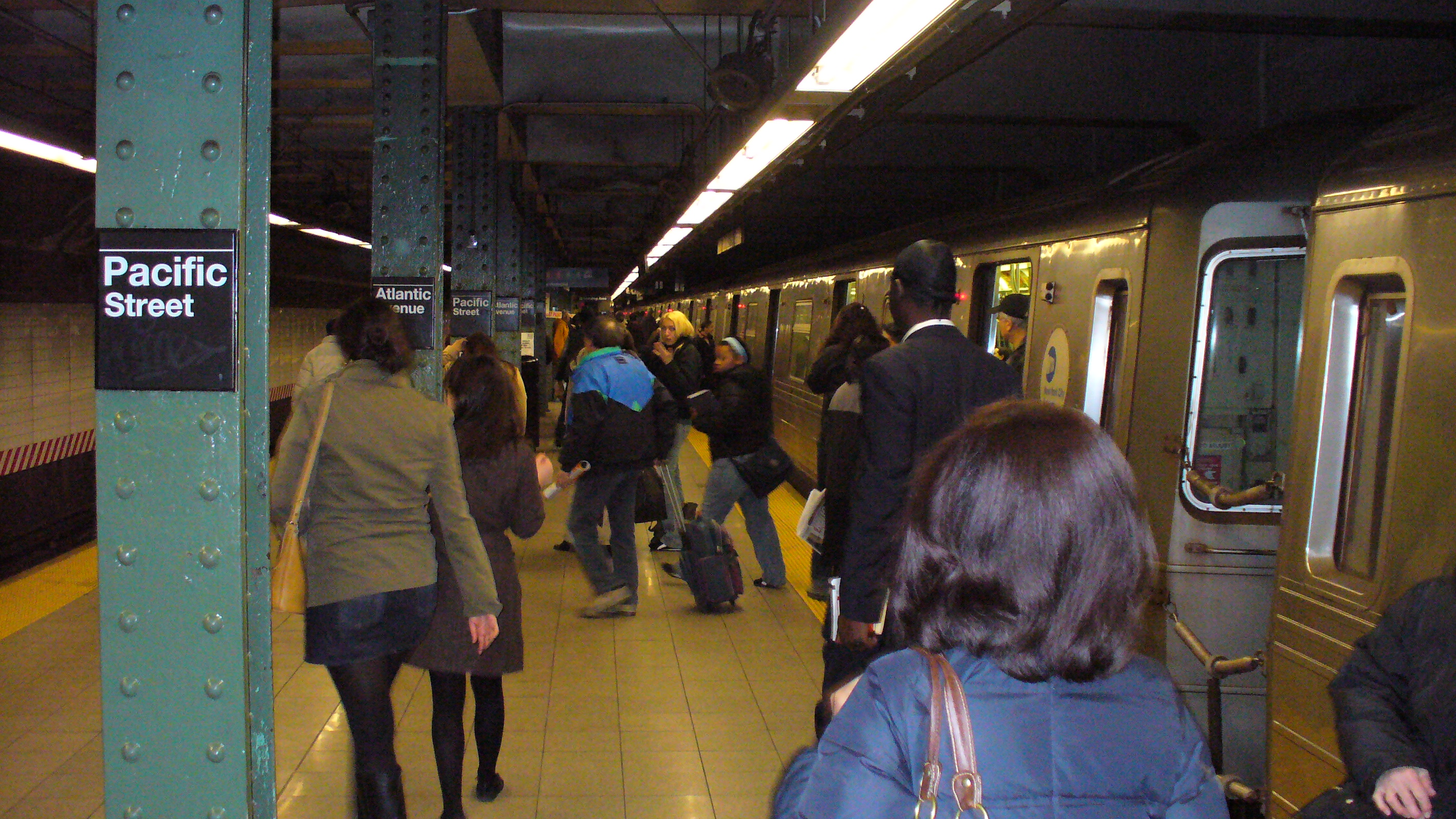
The Fourth Avenue Line station was originally known as Pacific Street.

The New York City Board of Estimate approved the construction of the Fourth Avenue Line, a subway line running under Fourth Avenue, in early 1908. Contracts for the Fourth Avenue Line were awarded on May 22, 1908, for the section between 43rd Street and the Manhattan Bridge, but the Board of Estimate did not approve them until October 29, 1909, when a taxpayer's lawsuit regarding the city's debt was settled. Groundbreaking for the first section of the subway, between DeKalb Avenue and 43rd Street (ending at 36th Street), took place on November 13, 1909, at DeKalb Avenue and Flatbush Avenue, after the plans and surveys for the line were completed. The Fourth Avenue Line was assigned to the BRT (after 1923, the Brooklyn–Manhattan Transit Corporation or BMT) in the Dual Contracts, a series of contracts for the construction, rehabilitation, and operation of rapid transit lines in New York City, which were adopted on March 4, 1913.

William Bradley built the portion of the line from the intersection of Fulton Street and Ashland Place to the intersection of Fourth Avenue and Sackett Street, including the Pacific Street station. This section passed under the existing IRT subway and required the relocation of a sewer. Because of the presence of the sewer, the section under Flatbush Avenue was built in two pieces; the eastern part of the tunnel was built first, followed by the western part. The president of the IRT wrote a letter to the Public Service Commission, complaining that the Fourth Avenue Line's construction was damaging the IRT station at Atlantic Avenue. The South Brooklyn Board of Trade proposed in 1910 to change the Pacific Street station from an express stop to a local stop, as well as changing the Ninth Street and DeKalb Avenue stations from local to express stops, but this was not done. By January 1912, the tunnel containing the Pacific Street station had been completed, and contractors were installing station finishes. D. C. Serber received a contract to install the station finish along the northbound local track, as well as various other station finishes, in early June 1915.

The Pacific Street station opened on June 22, 1915, as part of an extension of the subway to Coney Island, which included the Fourth Avenue Line north of 59th Street as well as the entire Sea Beach Line. The station's opening was marked with a competition between two trains heading from Chambers Street station in Manhattan to the Coney Island station, one heading via the West End Line and the other via the Sea Beach Line; the latter got to Coney Island first. As an express station, the Pacific Street station was originally 480 feet (150 m) long to accommodate eight-car trains. Workers also built a passageway from the Fourth Avenue Line's Pacific Street station to the IRT's Atlantic Avenue station, which was completed by late 1915. The tunnel was not opened along with the rest of the Fourth Avenue Line station, since the IRT and BRT could not reach an agreement on splitting maintenance costs. Following pressure from Public Service Commissioner Travis H. Whitney, the two companies opened the passageway on October 4, 1916, while they worked out an agreement.

==== Brighton Line and Eastern Parkway Line extension ====
Two lines under Flatbush Avenue, one each operated by the BRT and IRT, were also approved as part of the Dual Contracts. The IRT was authorized to extend its Brooklyn line under Flatbush Avenue, with a four-track route paralleling the BRT's subway southeast of the existing Atlantic Avenue station. The BRT route, an extension of the Brighton Line, was to run under Flatbush Avenue and St. Felix Street in Downtown Brooklyn, with a station at Atlantic Avenue. This station would connect not only with the original IRT and the LIRR, but also with the Fourth Avenue Line station at Pacific Street. The BRT route was originally planned as a four-track line. Groundbreaking for the lines under Flatbush Avenue took place in May 1914, by which point the BRT line was reduced to two tracks. The Cranford Company was contracted to build two sections of the Flatbush Avenue tunnel, extending from Fulton Street to Grand Army Plaza, in mid-1914.

The IRT's architects filed plans in mid-1915 for the construction of a glass structure on the south side of Atlantic Avenue, just outside the station, which was to contain stores. By 1918, the Atlantic Avenue station had become a bottleneck for IRT service, although the completion of the Dual Contracts was expected to alleviate the station's congestion. The Dual Contracts expansions necessitated that the station be widened to four tracks, so the original island platform was shaved back, allowing the IRT to install two tracks to the inside of the existing tracks. The island platform served IRT Lexington Avenue Line trains, while the side platforms were to serve trains using the Clark Street Tunnel and the IRT Broadway–Seventh Avenue Line, after the original IRT line was split into an "H" system in 1918. To allow this new service pattern, the Rapid Transit Commission allocated $300,000 in May 1918 for the construction of new track connections at the Times Square, Borough Hall, and Atlantic Avenue stations. By 1917, new track crossovers had been installed at the IRT's Atlantic Avenue station, and a set of temporary platforms were removed after the two new tracks had been added. The connection between the southern ends of the platforms was removed, and a second underpass at the south end of the station opened in early 1919. Large signs were installed near some station entrances to help passengers who were transferring from BRT streetcar routes. The Public Service Commission also gave passengers maps of the revised station and track layout.

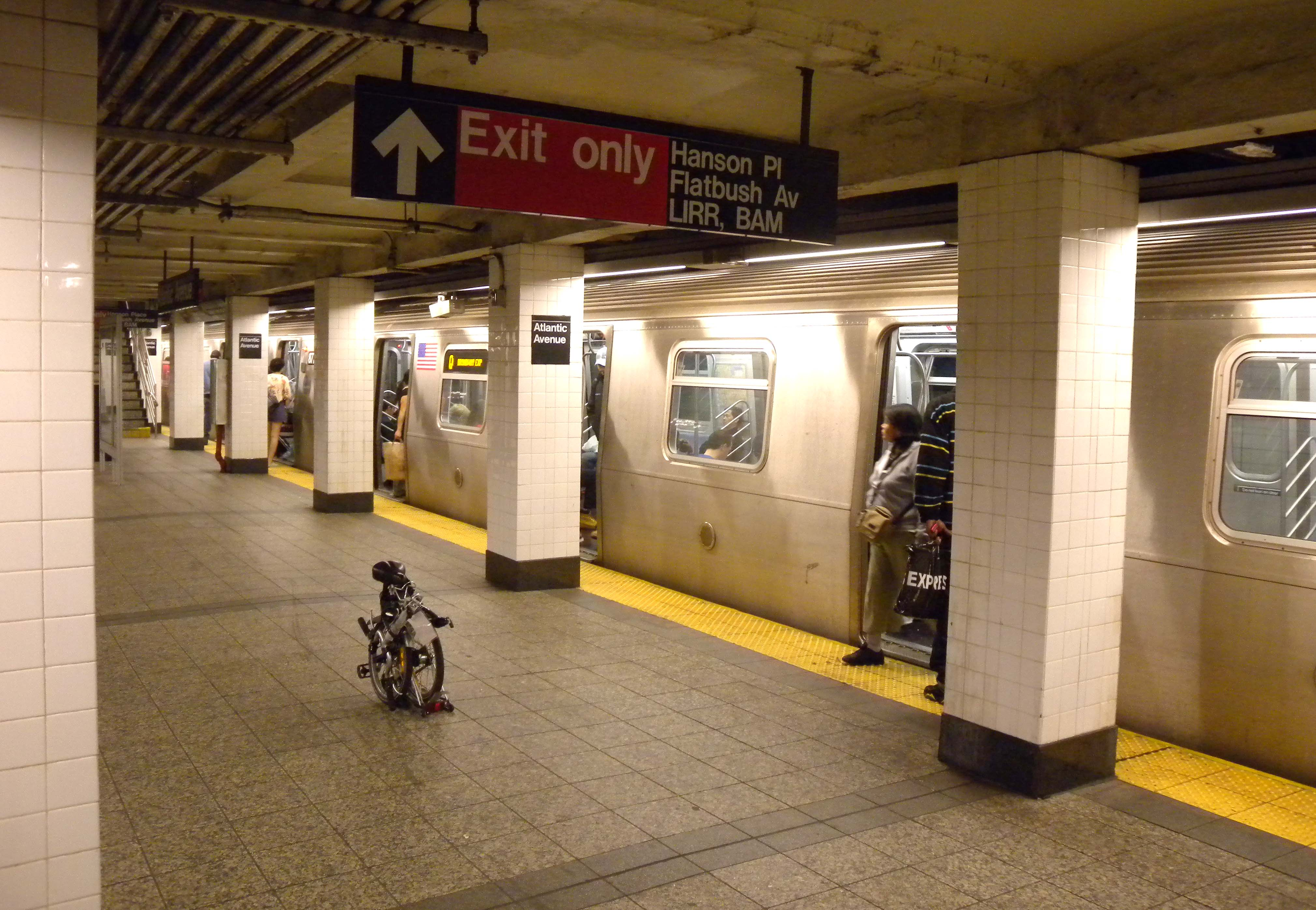
The Brighton Line platform was built as part of the Dual Contracts.

Meanwhile, for the construction of the Brighton Line's Atlantic Avenue station, the BRT sought an easement from the LIRR because the route was to run partially under Atlantic Terminal. To the north of Atlantic Avenue, the BRT line was to be built under St. Felix Street and then Fulton Street, while to the south, it would run parallel to the four-track IRT line under Flatbush Avenue. Construction of the segment of the line under St. Felix Street, including the Atlantic Avenue station, was delayed due to disagreements with the LIRR, which did not grant the New York City government an easement until 1915. The LIRR agreed to build a concrete slab beneath its terminal for $250,000, allowing the BRT to build its station underneath. The Degnon Construction Company was hired to build the short section of tunnel under St. Felix Street for $810,265 in March 1916. The Brighton Line platform had to be placed at a relatively deep level, necessitating the construction of an escalator. The Transit Commission began soliciting bids in July 1919 for the installation of station finishes at the Brighton Line's Atlantic Avenue station. Charles H. Brown submitted a low bid of approximately $86,000 for this contract, which was then awarded to P. N. Brown & Co. at that price. By that December, the station was 98 percent completed.

Broadway–Seventh Avenue Line trains began operating to the IRT's Atlantic Avenue station after the Clark Street Tunnel opened in 1919. These trains originally terminated on the northbound local track. Express trains began operating on the Eastern Parkway Line when it was extended to Utica Avenue on August 23, 1920, although all off-peak trains from Manhattan continued to terminate at Atlantic Avenue until early 1921. The BRT Brighton Line's Atlantic Avenue station opened on August 1, 1920, providing direct service between the existing Brighton Line and Midtown Manhattan.

=== 1920s to 1950s ===
As part of an agreement with the IRT and BRT, the New York Telephone Company installed payphones at the Atlantic Avenue station in September 1920, making the station one of the first to receive such phones. In 1922, the Rapid Transit Commission awarded a contract to the Wagner Engineering Company for the installation of navigational signs at the Atlantic Avenue station and several other major subway stations. The IRT platforms received blue-and-white signs, while the BRT platforms received red-white-and-green navigational signs.

Also in 1922, the New York State Transit Commission commissioned its engineers to examine platform-lengthening plans for 23 stations on the lines of the Brooklyn–Manhattan Transit Corporation (BMT), the successor to the BRT, to accommodate eight-car trains. As part of the project, platforms would be lengthened to 530 feet (160 m). Though the Transit Commission ordered the BMT to lengthen these platforms in September 1923, no further progress was made until February 16, 1925, when the New York City Board of Transportation (BOT) commissioned its engineers to examine platform-lengthening plans for Pacific Street and eleven other stations along the Fourth Avenue Line. It estimated the project would cost $633,000 (equivalent to $11,621,000 in 2025). The Brighton Line platform at Atlantic Avenue was also to be lengthened to accommodate eight-car trains. The New York City Board of Estimate appropriated $362,841 for the lengthening of the platforms at Pacific Street, Atlantic Avenue, and four other stations in January 1926 and awarded the contract to Charles Meads & Company early the next month. The platform extensions at Atlantic Avenue and Pacific Street opened on August 1, 1927. The eastbound IRT local platform at Atlantic Avenue also needed to be lengthened, but, according to witness testimony in 1926, only by about 24 feet (7.3 m).

In February 1928, bids were received by the BOT on a project to remove kiosk subway entrances from the median of Fourth Avenue and to relocate them to the sidewalk to improve safety for transit riders. As part of the project, the station entrances at Pacific Street, along with at 36th Street and 59th Street, would be relocated. In addition, malls between 44th Street and 47th Street would be reduced in width, and the malls from 61st Street to 58th Street, and from 36th Street to Atlantic Avenue would be removed. Mezzanines would be constructed to allow riders to cross Fourth Avenue below street level. Work would be completed within six months. As part of a pilot program, the BMT installed silencers on turnstiles at the Fourth Avenue Line's Pacific Street station in August 1930.

The city government took over the BMT's operations on June 1, 1940, and the IRT's operations on June 12, 1940. The BOT announced plans in November 1949 to extend platforms at several IRT stations, including Atlantic Avenue, to accommodate all doors on ten-car trains. Although ten-car trains already operated on the line, the rear car could not open its doors at the station because the platforms were so short. Funding for the platform extensions was included in the city's 1950 capital budget. The New York City Transit Authority (NYCTA) announced plans in 1956 to add fluorescent lights throughout the IRT portion of the station. In July 1959, the NYCTA announced that it would install fluorescent lighting at the Fourth Avenue Line station and five other stations along the Fourth Avenue Line for between $175,000 and $200,000. Bids on the project were to be advertised on August 7, 1959, and completed by fall 1960.

=== 1960s to 1980s ===
In August 1961, NYCTA chairman Charles Patterson announced a $2.5 million project to reconfigure the tracks between Nevins Street and Atlantic Avenue, reducing the travel time between the two stations by up to one minute. The platforms at the two stations would be extended to accommodate 10-car trains, as opposed to the eight and nine-car trains that they could serve at the time, and the tracks between the two stations would be straightened. During the 1964–1965 fiscal year, the Brighton Line platforms at Atlantic Avenue, along with those at six other stations on the Brighton Line, were lengthened to 615 feet (187 m) to accommodate a ten-car train of 60-foot (18 m) IND cars, or a nine-car train of 67-foot (20 m) BMT cars.

Passengers had advocated for the passageway between the stations to be placed within fare control as early as 1949. The transfer between the Brighton Line and Eastern Parkway Line was placed within fare control until November 26, 1967, to alleviate congestion caused by major service changes related to the opening of the Chrystie Street Connection. On January 16, 1978, the Fourth Avenue Line station was placed within the same fare control area as the two other stations in the complex. This eliminated the need for passengers to pay a second fare to transfer between the Fourth Avenue Line and either the Eastern Parkway Line or the Brighton Line. In addition, the Metropolitan Transportation Authority (MTA) planned to construct a passageway between the LIRR and subway stations at Atlantic Avenue; at the time, an average of 8,000 passengers per day transferred from the LIRR to the subway.

The MTA announced in late 1978 that it would modernize the Atlantic Avenue/Pacific Street station. The improvements included new finishes on the walls and floors; acoustical, signage, and lighting improvements; replacement of old mechanical equipment; and new handrails. A further renovation of the Atlantic Avenue station was funded in 1983 as part of the MTA's capital plan. The renovation was supposed to begin in 1983 but was postponed to 1989 due to various issues such as cost overruns. The complex was planned to be renovated for $26.6 million, but MTA officials diverted funding for the project in December 1989 to cover a budget shortfall. To discourage crime, the MTA also installed CCTV cameras at the Atlantic Avenue IRT station in 1989.

=== 1990s to present ===
The MTA requested funding for the station's renovation as part of its 1990–1994 capital program. In April 1993, the New York State Legislature agreed to give the MTA $9.6 billion for capital improvements. Some of the funds would be used to renovate nearly one hundred New York City Subway stations, including all three stations at Atlantic Avenue–Pacific Street. About $49 million in funding was allotted to the Atlantic Avenue station's renovation, but, by mid-1993, the city indicated that it might not be able to provide these funds. In 1994, the administration of mayor Rudy Giuliani proposed delaying the station's renovation; the project was indefinitely deferred later the same year. The Brighton Line and Fourth Avenue Line stations at Atlantic Avenue/Pacific Street were also supposed to receive elevators, as part of the MTA's plan to make dozens of "key stations" accessible to passengers with disabilities. By 1993, the elevator installations had been postponed to 2002 due to a lack of money.

Local newspaper Newsday wrote that the station suffered from chipped tiles, missing ceiling sections, and flaking plasterwork and that some of the damage had been painted in an attempt to hide the deterioration. At the time, the subway station and adjacent LIRR terminal saw 50 million passengers per year, and a major mixed-use development was being planned for the area above the station. A pair of Palestinians plotted to bomb the station in 1997, but police thwarted the attack.

==== Renovation ====
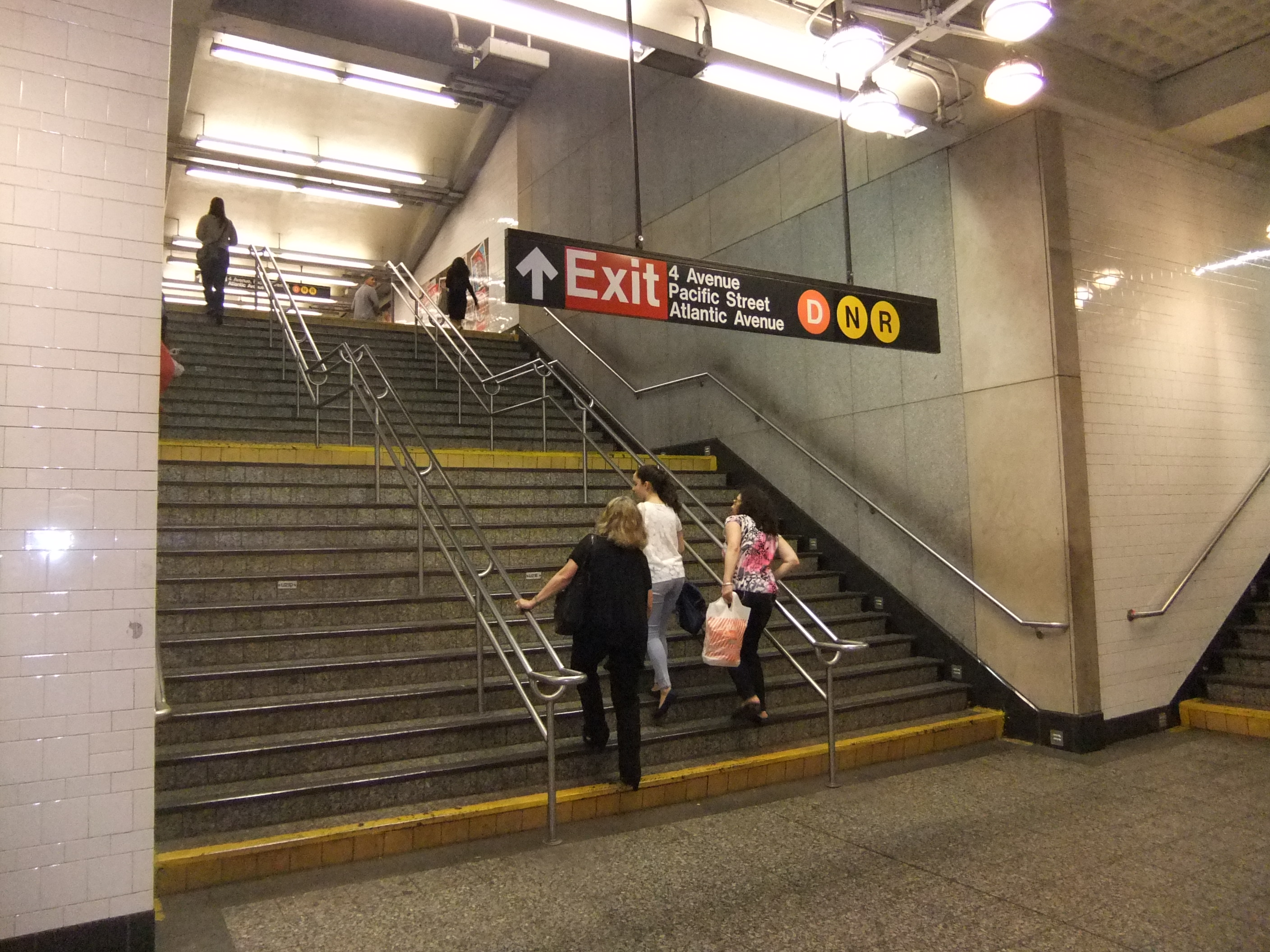
Stair from IRT mezzanine to Fourth Avenue mezzanine and exit, directly below the former headhouse

On January 21, 1997, work began on a 42-month project to widen Flatbush Avenue from six to eight lanes near Hanson Place and Atlantic Avenue and to waterproof and repair the roof of the IRT station. The MTA announced the same month that it would award an $11 million design contract for the renovation the following month. At the time, the project was to cost $147 million. A joint venture of de Domenico + Partners and Parsons Brinckerhoff was hired to design the project, which included a new LIRR entrance, a new lower mezzanine below the IRT station, and ventilation improvements. The MTA approved plans in March 1998 to renovate the Atlantic Avenue–Pacific Street subway station and the adjoining LIRR terminal, as well as build the Atlantic Terminal shopping mall above the station. Work on the stations' renovation began in 2000, and work on the shopping mall commenced the next year.

When the renovation began, workers dug two temporary 40-foot-deep (12 m) holes, through which they installed supports measuring 90 feet (27 m) long to carry the weight of the street above. The supports allowed workers to excavate the entire site at once and reduced construction time by one year. The entire IRT station had to be supported by 36-foot-long (11 m) crossbeams hanging from the roof of the station box; the station was also supported by conventional columns from below. The installation of these supports required extensive pile testing because this technique had never been used on the New York City Subway system. The subway infrastructure under Flatbush Avenue, as well as the avenue itself, were collectively raised by less than an inch.

As part of the project, contractors built or rebuilt fifteen stairs. The MTA also re-tiled the walls and floors, upgraded the station's lights and the public address system, and installed new trackbeds for local and express trains entering the IRT station. The passageway between the Atlantic Avenue and Pacific Street portions of the complex was widened from 15 to 42 feet (4.6 to 12.8 m). An escalator was replaced at Hanson Place, and a new station entrance was added there. The station house was also temporarily relocated for restoration, then moved back to its original site. To approximate the original look of the station house, contractors ordered bricks from Minnesota for $4 apiece. In 2004, the Brighton and Eastern Parkway lines' platforms were added to the NRHP. Additionally, eight elevators were installed throughout the station complex at a cost of $77.9 million. When the elevators were completed, disabled riders could only enter one car of IRT express trains because part of that platform was too narrow. The entire IRT express platform became accessible in 2007 after the MTA spent $360,000 to relocate two stair railings.

==== Later modifications ====
In June 2009, the MTA sold the naming rights of the station complex to Barclays, who had also bought the naming rights to the under-construction Barclays Center sports arena, for 20 years at $200,000 per year. It was one of the few such renames in the system; following this renaming, the MTA considered selling the naming rights of other subway stations. (Note: Willets Point–Shea Stadium, in Queens, was another example of a station with such naming rights, until the MTA simply renamed it to Mets–Willets Point following Shea Stadium's demolition in 2009.) A new entrance through the station, the Atlantic Terminal Pavilion, opened in 2010. As part of a pilot program, digital announcement boards, train countdown clocks, and improved intercom systems were installed in the station the same year. In advance of Barclays Center's opening, the station was renamed Atlantic Avenue–Barclays Center in May 2012. A new entrance serving the arena, which includes stairs, escalators, and an elevator, opened in September 2012 at a cost of $76 million. The new entrance, originally budgeted at $29 million, required digging a hole measuring 35 feet (11 m) deep and 100 by 125 feet (30 by 38 m) wide.

The MTA announced in December 2021 that it would install wide-aisle fare gates for disabled passengers at five subway stations, including Atlantic Avenue–Barclays Center, by mid-2022. The implementation of these fare gates was delayed; the MTA's chief accessibility officer indicated in February 2023 that the new fare gates would be installed at the Atlantic Avenue–Barclays Center and Sutphin Boulevard–Archer Avenue–JFK Airport stations shortly afterward. The MTA announced in late 2022 that it would open customer service centers at 15 stations; the centers would provide services such as travel information and OMNY farecards. The first six customer service centers, including one at the Atlantic Avenue–Barclays Center station, were to open in early 2023. The Atlantic Avenue–Barclays Center station's customer service center opened in February 2023.

In April 2025, the MTA announced plans to install taller fare gates with glass panels at 20 stations, including the Atlantic Avenue–Barclays Center station, where they were installed that December. The fare gates would be manufactured by Cubic Transportation Systems, Conduent, Scheidt & Bachmann, and STraffic as part of a pilot program to reduce fare evasion.

== Station layout ==
Metrically accurate station map of Atlantic Terminal / Atlantic Av-Barclays Ctr, showing tracks, platforms, mezzanines, stairs, elevators, escalators, exits, ticket machines (subway and LIRR), gates, benches, restrooms, and trashcans.

The station complex consists of three stations: those of the Eastern Parkway Line, Brighton Line, and Fourth Avenue Line. The Fourth Avenue Line station runs in a southwest-northeast direction under Fourth Avenue. The Eastern Parkway Line station runs in a northwest-southeast direction under Flatbush Avenue, next to the Long Island Rail Road's Atlantic Terminal, while the Brighton Line platform runs almost precisely north-south under the terminal. The Brighton Line platform is oriented with St. Felix Street and runs partly under private property.

The shallowest of the stations, the Eastern Parkway Line platforms, is at the same level as the Atlantic Terminal railway platforms and are only 20 feet (6.1 m) below street level. The second level below ground is the Fourth Avenue Line platforms, which are 40 feet (12 m) deep and have a mezzanine. The deepest is the Brighton Line platform, which is approximately 60 feet (18 m) deep and has two mezzanines above it. The Eastern Parkway Line and Brighton Line portions of the complex are listed on the National Register of Historic Places.

=== Mezzanines ===
A 350-foot-long (110 m) passageway connects the Fourth Avenue Line platforms with the other platforms. This passageway was originally only 15 feet (4.6 m) wide but was widened to 42 feet (13 m) during the 2000s. At the western end of the passageway is a small mezzanine above the Fourth Avenue Line platforms, which has a fare control area and station agent's booth; the fare control area leads to exits at Fourth Avenue and Pacific Street. Originally, stairs led down from this passageway to the southbound IRT local platform, and additional stairs led to an underpass below the IRT platforms. The stairs to the southbound IRT local platform were replaced with a ramp during the 2000s renovation.

An underpass below all of the IRT platforms connects with the Fourth Avenue Line passage to the west and the Brighton Line and LIRR platforms to the east. Built as part of the original IRT station in 1908, it allowed IRT passengers to exit through the head house of Atlantic Terminal. The underpass was reconfigured and expanded as part of the early-2000s renovation, when elevators were built between the underpass and each IRT platform. In addition to a large stairway leading up to the Fourth Avenue Line passageway, two stairs lead from this underpass to the northbound IRT local platform, while three stairs lead to the IRT express platform. A set of turnstiles separates the Eastern Parkway Line mezzanine from a concourse leading to the LIRR station.

There is an additional underpass at the south end of the IRT station, which opened to the public in 1919. By the 2000s, this underpass had been closed to the public and converted to staff areas, and the stairs from either IRT local platform to the passageway had been removed. Another passageway between the Eastern Parkway and Brighton Line is present at the south end of the station, which also leads to an exit immediately adjacent to Barclays Center.

There are two mezzanines above the Brighton Line platform, which have wave-patterned wainscoting and white ceramic tiles. The lower mezzanine runs the entire length of the station. At the north end of the mezzanine is a set of high entry-exit turnstiles and a high exit-only gate, while the center of the mezzanine contains more high entry-exit turnstiles and a high exit-only gate. The rest of the lower mezzanine was closed to the public by the 2000s.

=== Artwork ===
The station contains a sculpture by George Trakas, Hook (Archean Reach), Line (Sea House), and Sinker (Mined Swell), which was commissioned as part of the MTA Arts & Design program and installed in 2004. The sculpture is placed under a skylight in the station's old control house, which is between the Fourth Avenue Line platforms and the other platforms, and includes a peephole and a boat-shaped steel structure. The walls of the mezzanine contain a wave-shaped granite wainscoting where the Fourth Avenue Line platforms (formerly the Pacific Street station) meet the other platforms (formerly the Atlantic Avenue station). In designing the sculpture, Trakas had intended to compare the station's role as a train hub with the maritime traffic on the Atlantic and Pacific oceans.

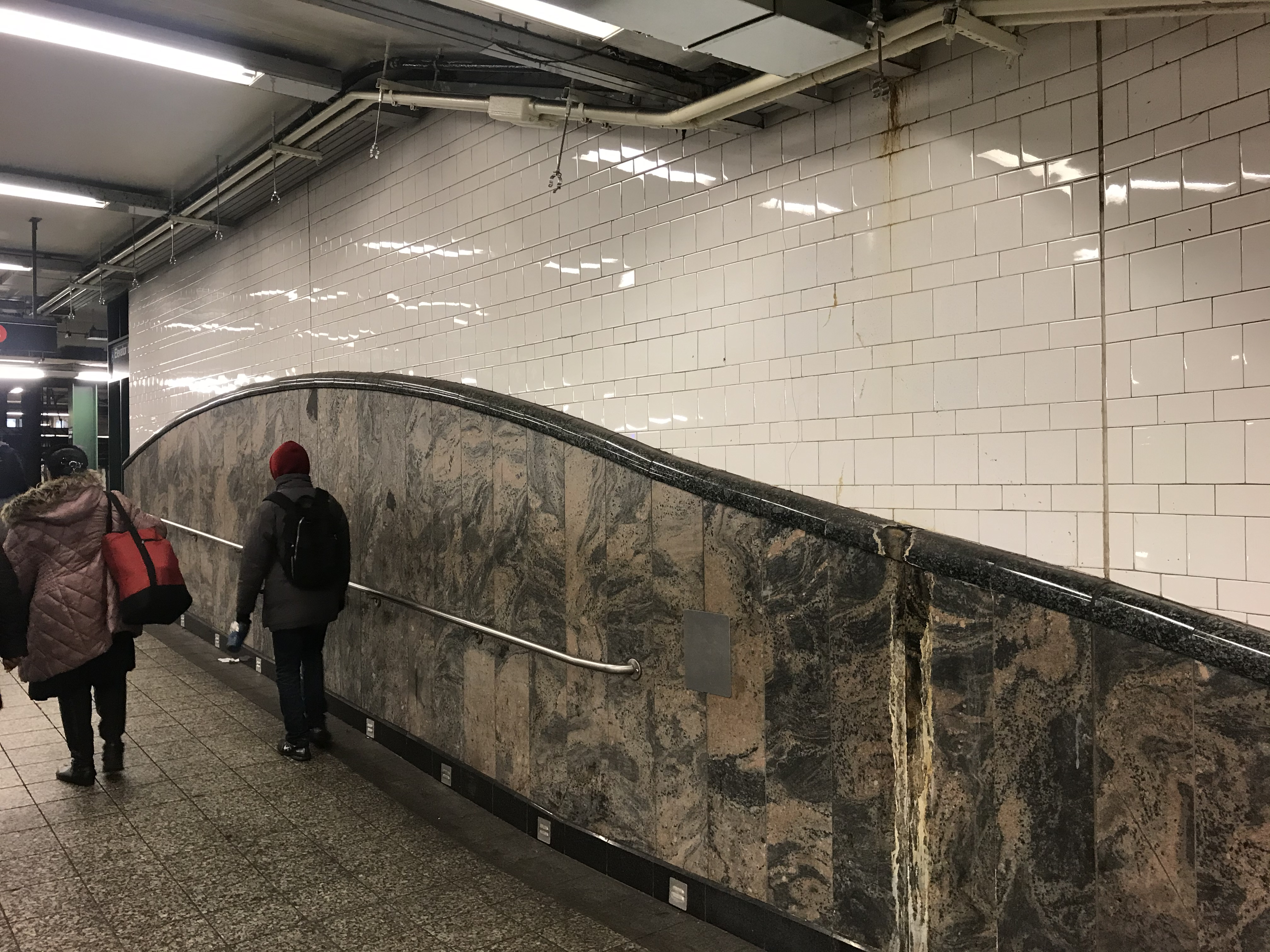
"Hook" on a transfer corridor

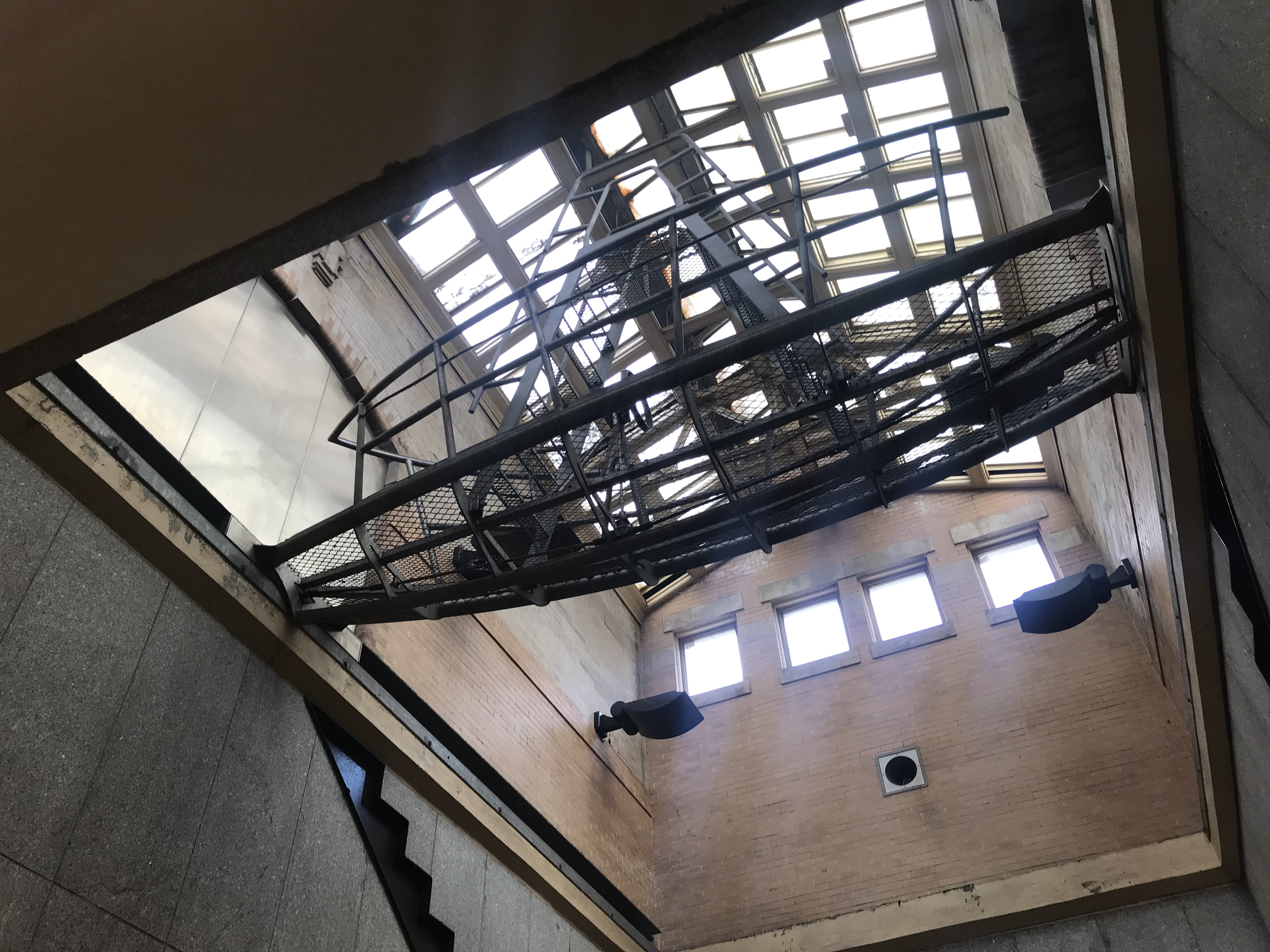
"Line" in the former control house

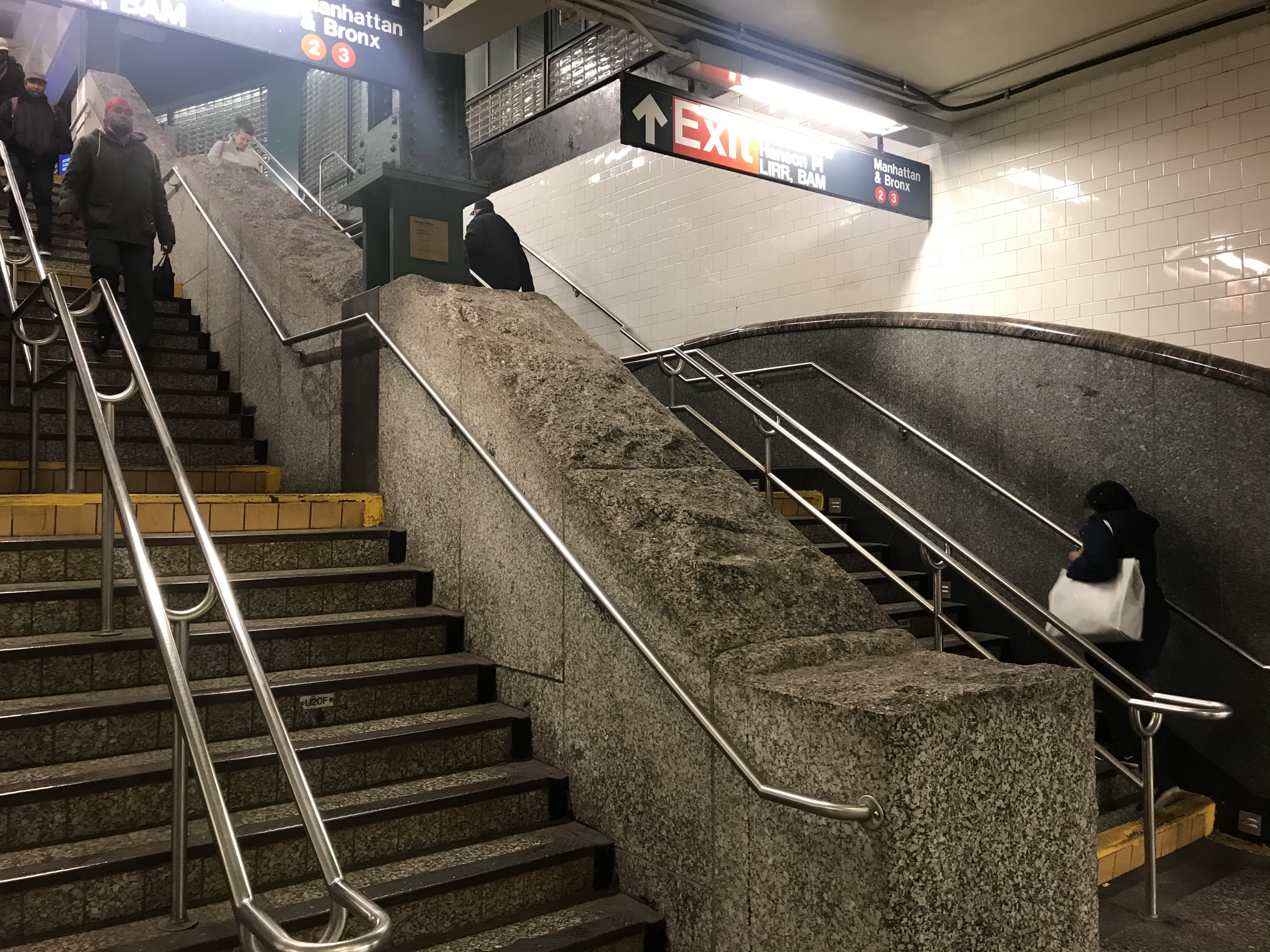
"Sinker" on the double-wide stairway to the northbound IRT local platform

=== Exits ===
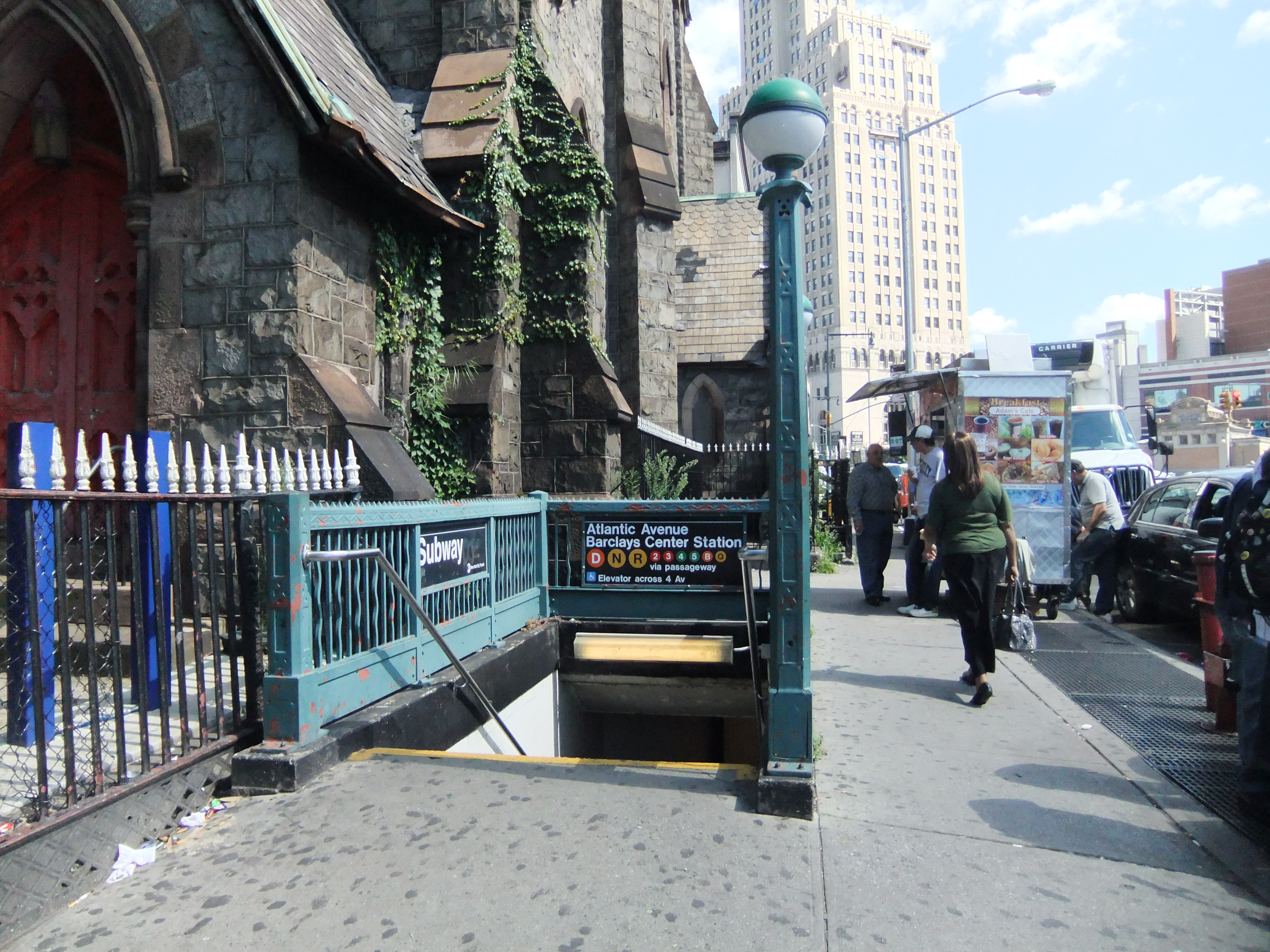
Street stair at the northwestern corner of Fourth Avenue and Pacific Street

To the Fourth Avenue portion of the complex, there is a stair to the northwest corner of Fourth Avenue and Pacific Street. There is also a stair and elevator to the northeast corner of Fourth Avenue and Pacific Street. This elevator makes the Fourth Avenue Line station ADA-accessible.

To the Eastern Parkway/Brighton portion of the complex, there is a stair to the northwestern corner of Hanson Place and St. Felix Street, and a stair and elevator to the southwestern corner of Hanson Place and St. Felix Street. A passageway also leads from the Brighton Line station's upper mezzanine to the basement of the Williamsburgh Savings Bank Tower, as well as directly to the street within the building. Two stairs lead to the north side of Flatbush Avenue southeast of Hanson Place. One of the street stairs had a metal hood, dating from the original IRT station's opening, which was removed as part of the 2000s renovation. The station also has a direct exit to the LIRR's Atlantic Terminal station through both the IRT mezzanine and the northbound local platform. The Atlantic Terminal exit at Hanson Place and Flatbush Avenue is also ADA-accessible and leads to the Brighton Line and Eastern Parkway Line platforms.

A stair, an elevator, and a set of escalators lead to Barclays Center at the southeast corner of Atlantic and Flatbush Avenues. The elevator is privately maintained and, during the 2010s, was one of the least reliable in the New York City Subway system. This subway entrance has a sloped roof that faces Barclays Center and is surrounded by wooden benches and gray pavers. A green roof was installed above the subway entrance as part of the construction of Barclays Center Plaza. Formerly, a stair led to the sidewalk at the southeast corner of Flatbush and Atlantic Avenues, but this stair had been closed by the 2000s.

=== Control house ===
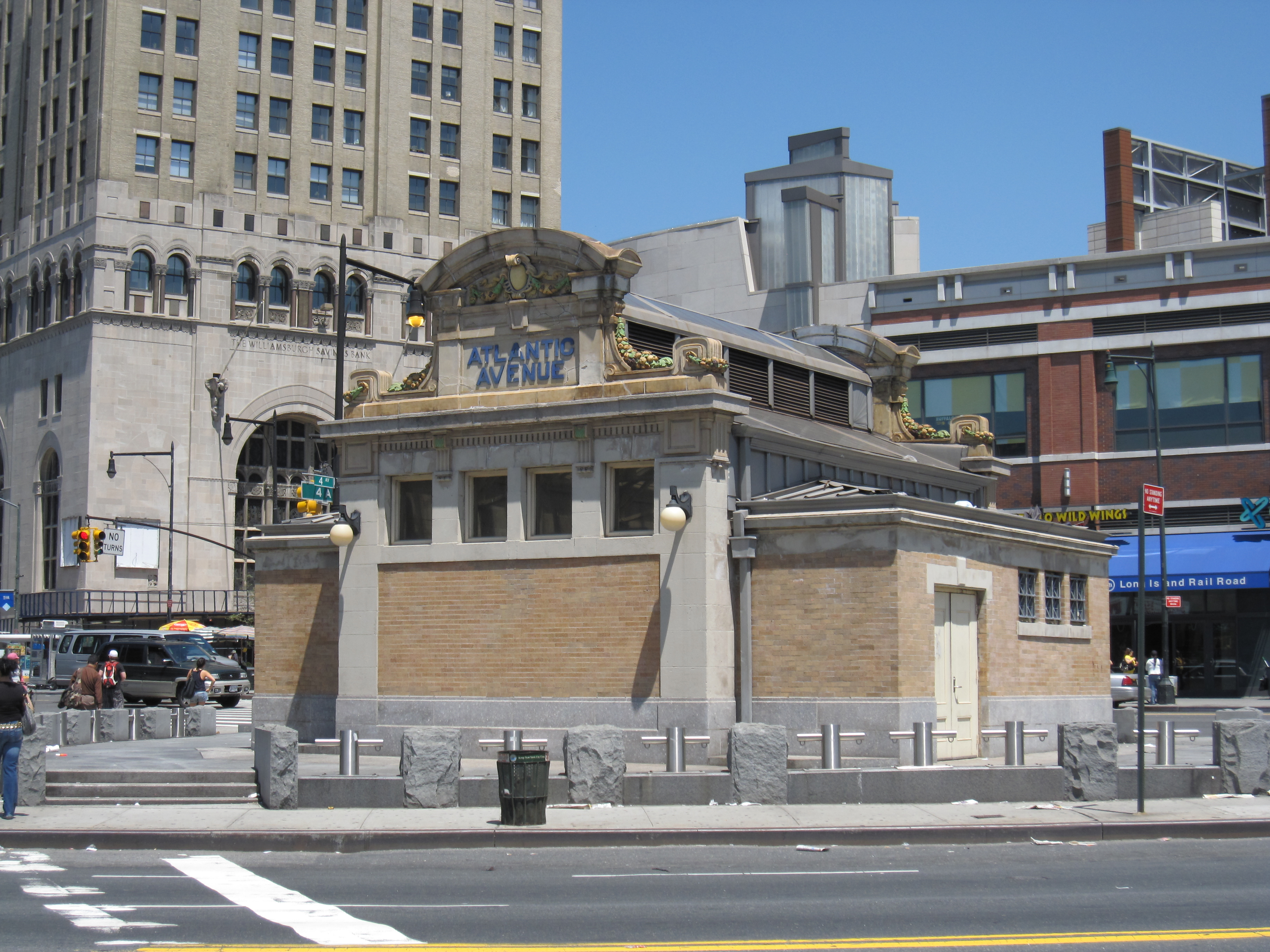
Looking southwest at the control house

The original IRT station house, also known as the control house, was designed by Heins & LaFarge, who also designed elements of many of the original IRT subway stations. It is designed in the Flemish Renaissance style. Intended as an ornate entrance to the station, the building sits on a traffic island bounded by Atlantic Avenue, Fourth Avenue, and Flatbush Avenue, which is known as Times Plaza. The control house occupies an area of 50 by 37 feet (15 by 11 m) and was adjacent to what is now the IRT station's southbound local platform. The station house was one of several on the original IRT; similar station houses were built at Bowling Green, Mott Avenue, 72nd Street, 103rd Street, and 116th Street.

The one-story control contains exterior walls made of buff brick, with a water table made of granite blocks. Above the ground story of the structure, the north and south facades contain four square windows, above which is a row of dentils. The west and east facades each contain three window openings with metal screens, The north and south facades are topped by a set of Dutch Revival-style gables. Terracotta letters spelling the name "Atlantic Avenue" are placed on the sides of each gable. Above the letters are a flat lintel with a keystone, as well as a cartouche flanked by swags. Just below the roof, the west and east facades contain ventilation grilles. The roof itself is made of standing-seam copper.

The control house's original interior was gutted by the 1970s, when it was used as a concession stand. Despite being listed on the National Register of Historic Places in 1980, the control house fell into decline over the years before being temporarily relocated during the station's 2000s renovation. Although the control house has since been restored, the actual entrance was removed and serves as a skylight into the IRT station. The skylight contains part of the Hook, Line, and Sinker artwork.

== IRT Eastern Parkway Line platforms ==
Atlantic Avenue–Barclays Center
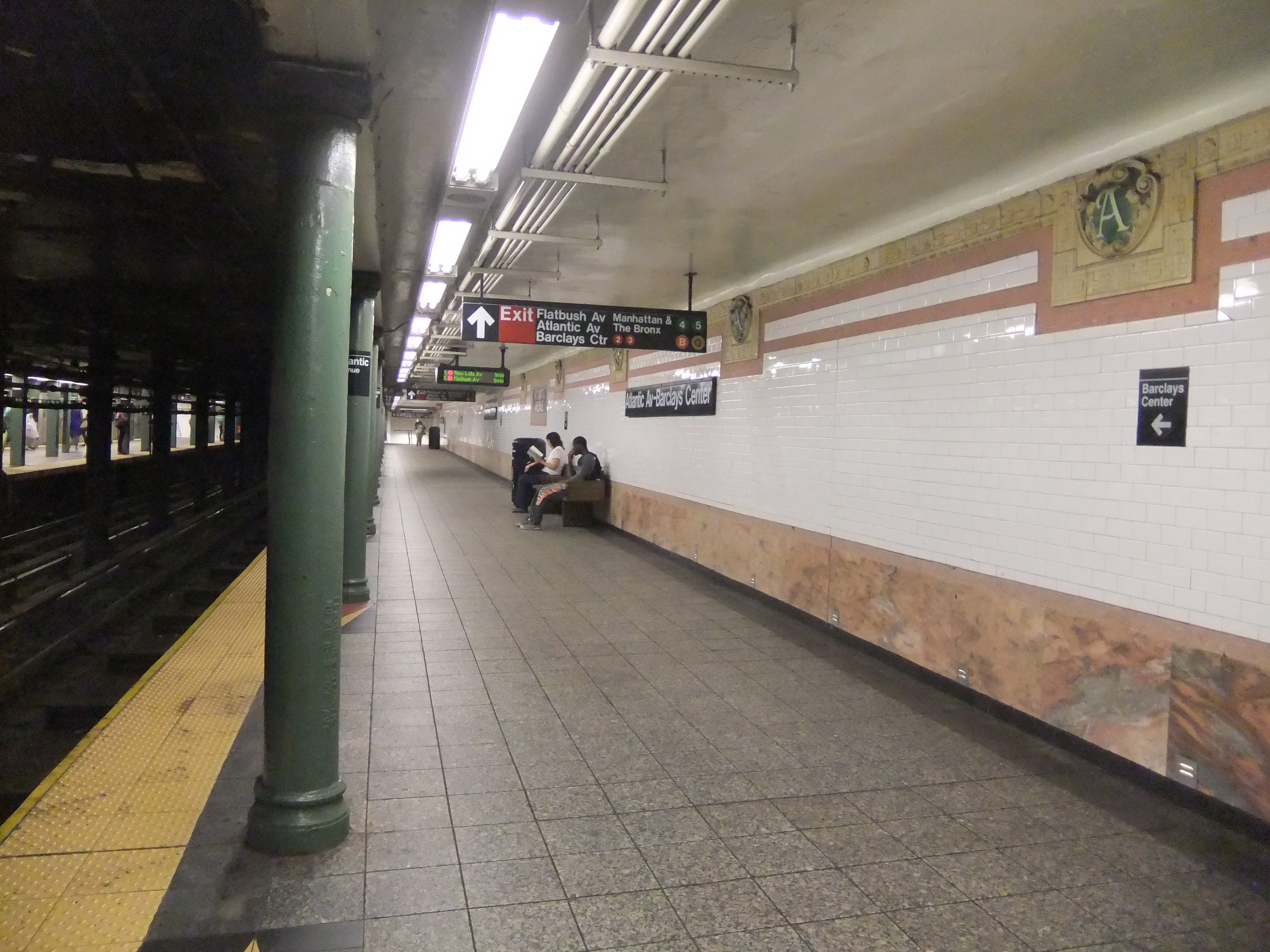
- Southbound local platform

Station statistics
- Division: A (IRT)
- Line: IRT Eastern Parkway Line
- Services: 2 (all times); 3 (all except late nights); 4 (all times); 5 (weekdays only)
- Structure: Underground
- Platforms: 2 side platforms (local); 1 island platform (express)
- Tracks: 4

Other information
- Opened: May 1, 1908; 118 years ago
- Accessible: Yes
- Former/other names: Atlantic Avenue
Services
Preceding station	New York City Subway	Following station
Nevins Street 2 3 4 5 northbound	Express	Franklin Avenue–Medgar Evers College 4 5 services split
Nevins Street 2 3 4 5 northbound	Local	Bergen Street 2 3 4 via Franklin Avenue–Medgar Evers College
Track layout
Station service legend
Symbol	Description
Stops all times except late nights	Stops all times except late nights
Stops all times	Stops all times
Stops weekdays during the day	Stops weekdays during the day
Stops late nights only	Stops late nights only
Stops weekdays and weekday late nights	Stops weekdays and weekday late nights
Stops late nights and weekends	Stops late nights and weekends
Stops weekends and weekend late nights	Stops weekends and weekend late nights

The Atlantic Avenue–Barclays Center station (originally Atlantic Avenue station) is an express station on the IRT Eastern Parkway Line. The station has four tracks, one island platform, and two side platforms. The local tracks are used by 2 trains at all times; 3 trains at all times except late nights; and 4 trains at night. The express tracks are used by 4 trains at all times except late nights, as well as by 5 trains on weekdays during the day. On all routes, the next station to the north is Nevins Street. The next station to the south is Bergen Street for local trains and Franklin Avenue–Medgar Evers College for express trains.

The platforms are all 530 feet (160 m) long; the southernmost 135 feet (41 m) of each platform was built in the early 1910s. Two stairs descend from the center of each side platform to the mezzanine connecting with the BMT and LIRR. Three stairs and an elevator descend from the center of the island platform to the mezzanine. The LIRR's Atlantic Terminal is just to the northeast of the northbound local platform, on the same level. There are turnstiles leading from the northbound local platform to the LIRR tracks; the station agent's booth for these turnstiles is located outside fare control, within the LIRR terminal. A second underpass, connecting only to the Brighton Line platforms, is at the southern end of each platform.

=== Design ===
As with other stations built as part of the original IRT, the station was constructed using a cut-and-cover method. The tunnel is covered by a U-shaped trough that contains utility pipes and wires. This trough contains a foundation of concrete no less than 4 inches (100 mm) thick. Each platform consists of 3-inch-thick (7.6 cm) concrete slabs, beneath which are drainage basins. The platforms contain cast-iron columns with Tuscan capitals, spaced every 15 feet (4.6 m). Additional columns between the tracks, spaced every 15 feet (4.6 m), support the reinforced concrete station roofs. The ceiling above the platforms and tracks is made of flat concrete and is covered with plaster. There is a 1-inch (25 mm) gap between the trough wall and the platform walls, which are made of 4-inch (100 mm)-thick brick covered over by a tiled finish.

The walls adjacent to the local platforms consist of a pink marble wainscoting on the lowest part of the wall, measuring 2 feet (0.61 m) high. Above this wainscoting is a horizontal band of pink mosaic tiles as well as white ceramic tiles. The walls contain mosaic tile plaques with the name "Atlantic Avenue"; these are framed by multicolored mosaic bands with foliate and geometric patterns, which in turn are framed by pink mosaic tile. The mosaic tiles at all original IRT stations were manufactured by the American Encaustic Tile Company, which subcontracted the installations at each station. Along the platforms, there are faience plaques every 15 feet (4.6 m), which depict tulips and scrolls flanking the letter "A". The plaques at the southern end of the southbound local platform are made of mosaic instead of faience. The northern end of the southbound local platform originally had glazed ceramic-block walls, while the northern end of the northbound platform has I-beam columns instead of round cast-iron columns. The express island platform has I-beam columns, and part of the floor is made of glass blocks.

=== Track layout ===
The Atlantic Avenue–Barclays Center station is one of three express stations in the New York City Subway system to have side platforms for local services and a center island platform for express services. The other two are the 34th Street–Penn Station stops on the IND Eighth Avenue Line and on the IRT Broadway–Seventh Avenue Line. This may have been done to reduce crowding, as cross-platform transfers could be made at the adjacent Nevins Street station. This arrangement was also a modification of the original station layout. When the Atlantic Avenue station opened in 1908, it was the terminal for the line and had two tracks, two side platforms, and one island platform. All of the platforms were connected at their southeastern end.

Northwest of the station, two trackways connected the LIRR's Atlantic Branch and the IRT line; only the northbound trackway was originally built. Vestiges of this track still exist. In addition, an unused trackway splits from the southbound local track for a proposed subway under Fourth Avenue (later built as the BMT Fourth Avenue Line). It merges with the Manhattan-bound express track and ends on a bumper block between the two express tracks at Nevins Street. Southeast of the station, there were provisions for two trackways to diverge to the LIRR's Atlantic Branch. The trackways to the southeast were never used but can be seen from public areas.

== BMT Brighton Line platform ==
Atlantic Avenue–Barclays Center
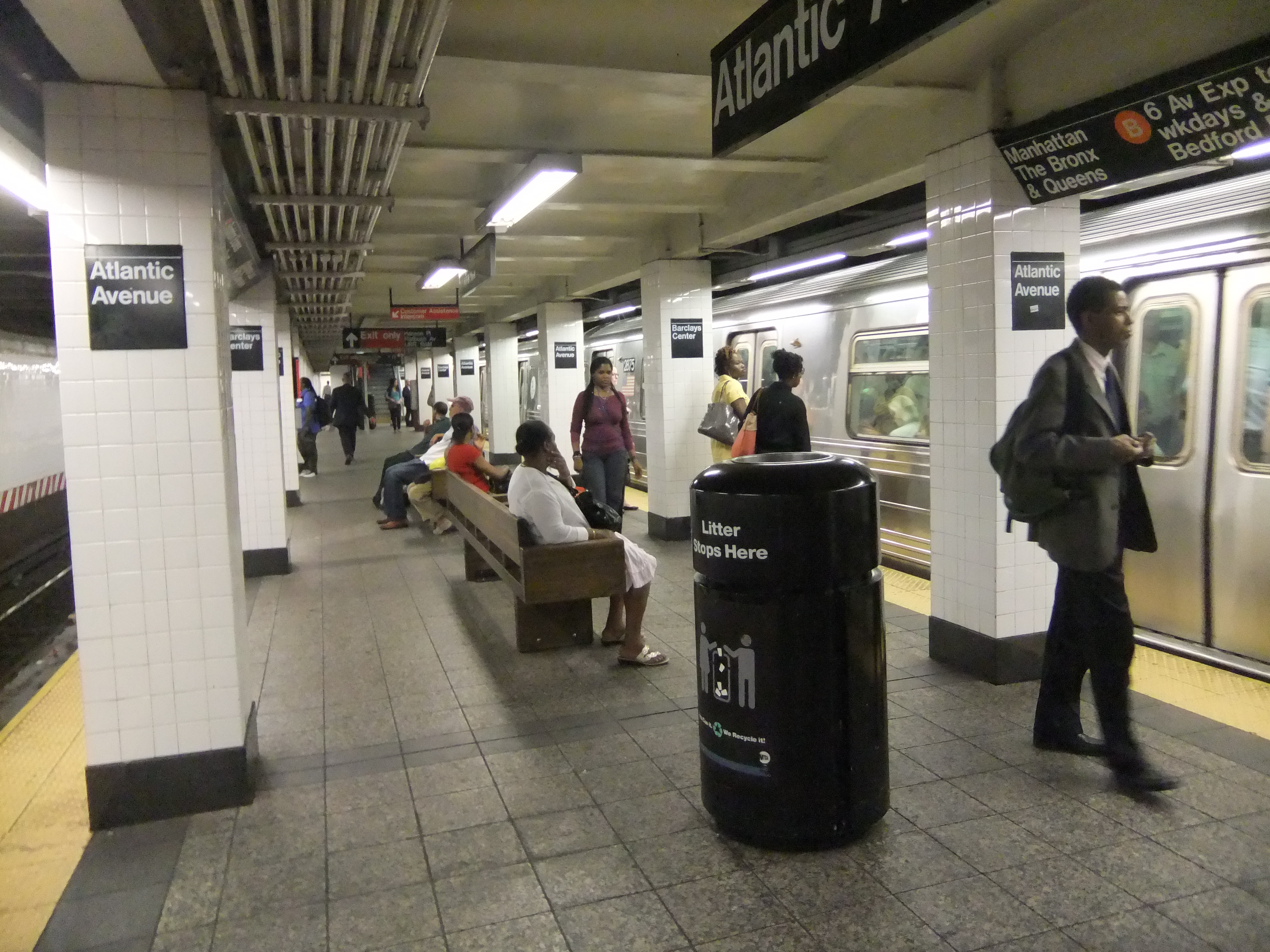
- Northbound R68 B train arriving at the station

Station statistics
- Division: B (BMT)
- Line: BMT Brighton Line
- Services: B (weekday rush hours, middays and early evenings); Q (all times)
- Structure: Underground
- Platforms: 1 island platform
- Tracks: 2

Other information
- Opened: August 1, 1920; 106 years ago
- Accessible: Yes
- Former/other names: Atlantic Avenue
Services
Preceding station	New York City Subway	Following station
DeKalb Avenue B Q services split	B (New York City Subway service) Q (New York City Subway service)	Seventh Avenue B Q via Prospect Park
Track layout
Station service legend
Symbol	Description
Stops all times	Stops all times
Stops weekdays during the day	Stops weekdays during the day

The Atlantic Avenue–Barclays Center station (originally Atlantic Avenue station) on the BMT Brighton Line has two tracks and an island platform. The Q train stops at the station at all times, while the B train stops here on weekdays during the day. On both routes, the Atlantic Avenue–Barclays Center station is between the DeKalb Avenue station to the north and the Seventh Avenue station to the south.

The platform contains tiled columns which support the ceiling. The walls next to the tracks are covered with white ceramic tiles and contain mosaic tablets with the station's name. At the top of the wall is a cornice composed of 5-foot-wide (1.5 m) blue-and-buff panels, above which is a border with geometric motifs. There are mosaic plaques every 15 feet (4.6 m), which have the letter "A". There is also an enamel sign pointing to the Brooklyn Academy of Music near the southern end of the platform. The platform was extended to the south in 1964–1965 to fit ten-car trains.

The platform has seven stairs: two to the Hanson Place exit at the north end (which does not link to any other platform), three to the main mezzanine, and two at the south end (which leads to both an exit immediately adjacent to Barclays Center and another mezzanine that connects to the IRT platforms). All of these stairs have white ceramic-tile walls.

North of this station, there is a bellmouth where the northbound track curves northwest onto Fulton Street. The bellmouth marks the location where the westbound track of the proposed Ashland Place Connection, which would have connected to the now-demolished BMT Fulton Street El, would have merged with the Brighton Line. (Note: The eastbound track of the Ashland Place Connection was not built. The track would have diverged from the southbound Brighton Line between Ashland Place and St. Felix Street, then curved east under Lafayette Avenue, to avoid an at-grade junction with the Brighton Line.) The bellmouth was added to the plans for the Brighton Line tunnel in 1916; at the time the city could not afford to build the connection. South of the station, the Brighton Line tracks cross underneath the Eastern Parkway Line's northbound tracks and curve under Flatbush Avenue.

== BMT Fourth Avenue Line platforms ==
Atlantic Avenue–Barclays Center
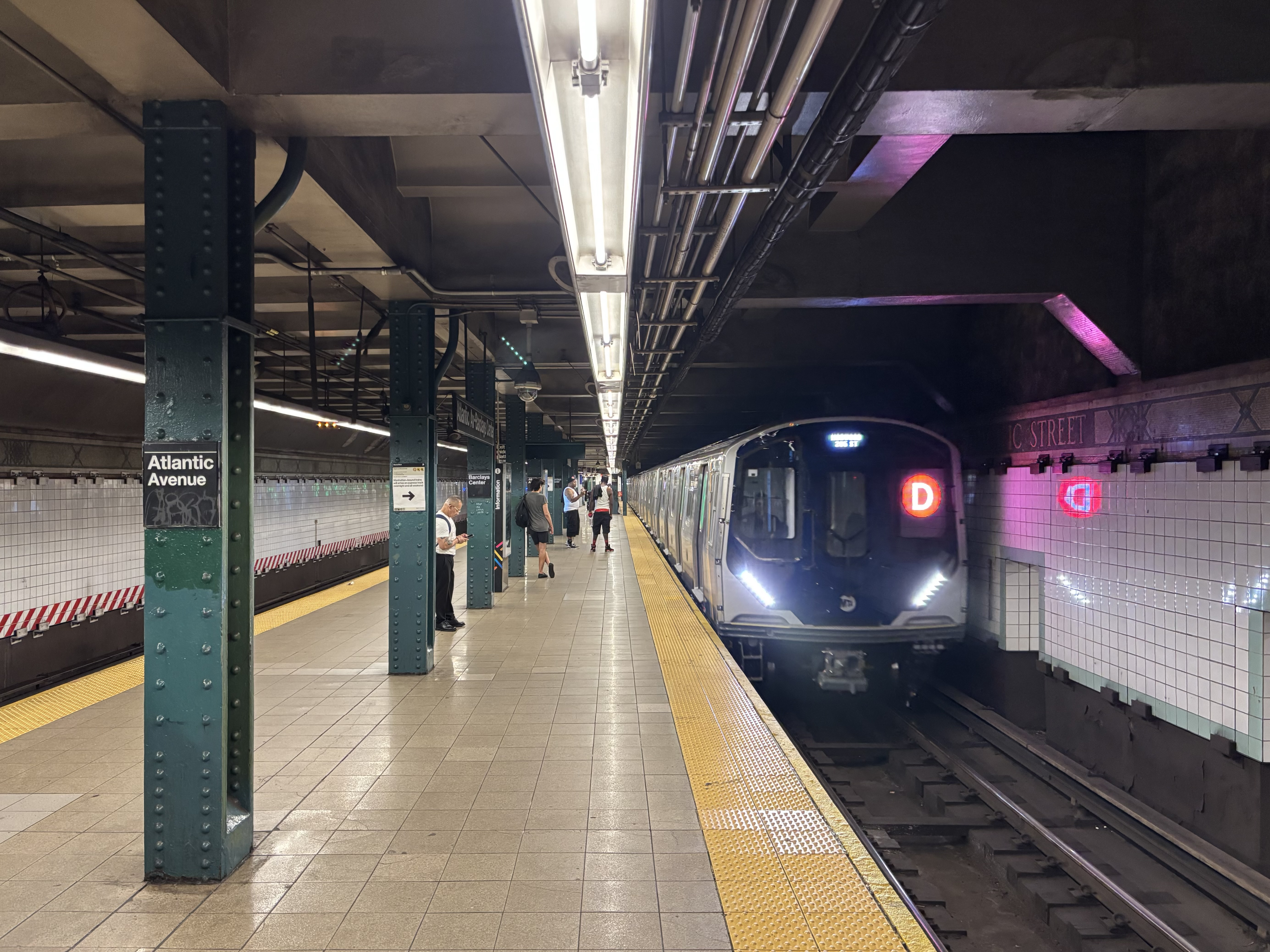
- R211A D train arriving at the northbound platform

Station statistics
- Division: B (BMT)
- Line: BMT Fourth Avenue Line
- Services: D (all times); N (all times); R (all times); W (limited rush hour service only)
- Structure: Underground
- Platforms: 2 island platforms cross-platform interchange
- Tracks: 4

Other information
- Opened: June 22, 1915; 111 years ago
- Accessible: Yes
- Former/other names: Pacific Street; Atlantic Avenue–Pacific Street
Services
Preceding station	New York City Subway	Following station
Grand Street D toward Norwood–205th Street	Express	36th Street D N toward Coney Island–Stillwell Avenue
Canal Street N Q toward Astoria–Ditmars Boulevard	Express	36th Street D N toward Coney Island–Stillwell Avenue
DeKalb Avenue D N R W toward Forest Hills–71st Avenue	Local	Union Street D N R W toward Bay Ridge–95th Street
Track layout
Station service legend
Symbol	Description
Stops all times except late nights	Stops all times except late nights
Stops all times	Stops all times
Stops late nights only	Stops late nights only
Stops rush hours only	Stops rush hours only
Stops rush hours in the peak direction only	Stops rush hours in the peak direction only

The Atlantic Avenue–Barclays Center station (originally Pacific Street station then Atlantic Avenue–Pacific Street station) is an express station on the BMT Fourth Avenue Line that has four tracks and two island platforms. The station is served by D, N, and R trains at all times, as well as limited W trains during rush hours. R and W trains always make local stops, while D and N trains make express stops during the day and local stops during the night. The next station to the south is Union Street for local trains and 36th Street for express trains. The next station to the north is DeKalb Avenue for local trains, Grand Street for express D trains via the Manhattan Bridge's north side and IND Sixth Avenue Line, and Canal Street for express N trains via the Manhattan Bridge's south side and BMT Broadway Line. To the north of the station, three switches connect the tracks.

The walls of the Pacific Street station were originally decorated with white tile and green marble. The color of the marble was intended to distinguish it from other stations on the Fourth Avenue Line. Within the tunnels north and south of the station, each of the BMT Fourth Avenue Line's four tracks is separated by a concrete wall, rather than by columns, as in older IRT tunnels. These walls were intended to improve ventilation, as passing trains would push air forward, rather than to the sides of the tunnel. At the Atlantic Avenue–Barclays Center station, there is a wall between the two express tracks. Waterproofing was placed under the floor, on the side walls, and above the roof of the tunnel when the station was built.

At the north end of the BMT Fourth Avenue platforms, three stairs and one elevator from each platform go up to the main fare control area. This leads both to the passageway connecting to the rest of the complex, as well as to the exits on Pacific Street.

== BMT Fifth Avenue Line station ==
Atlantic Ave.
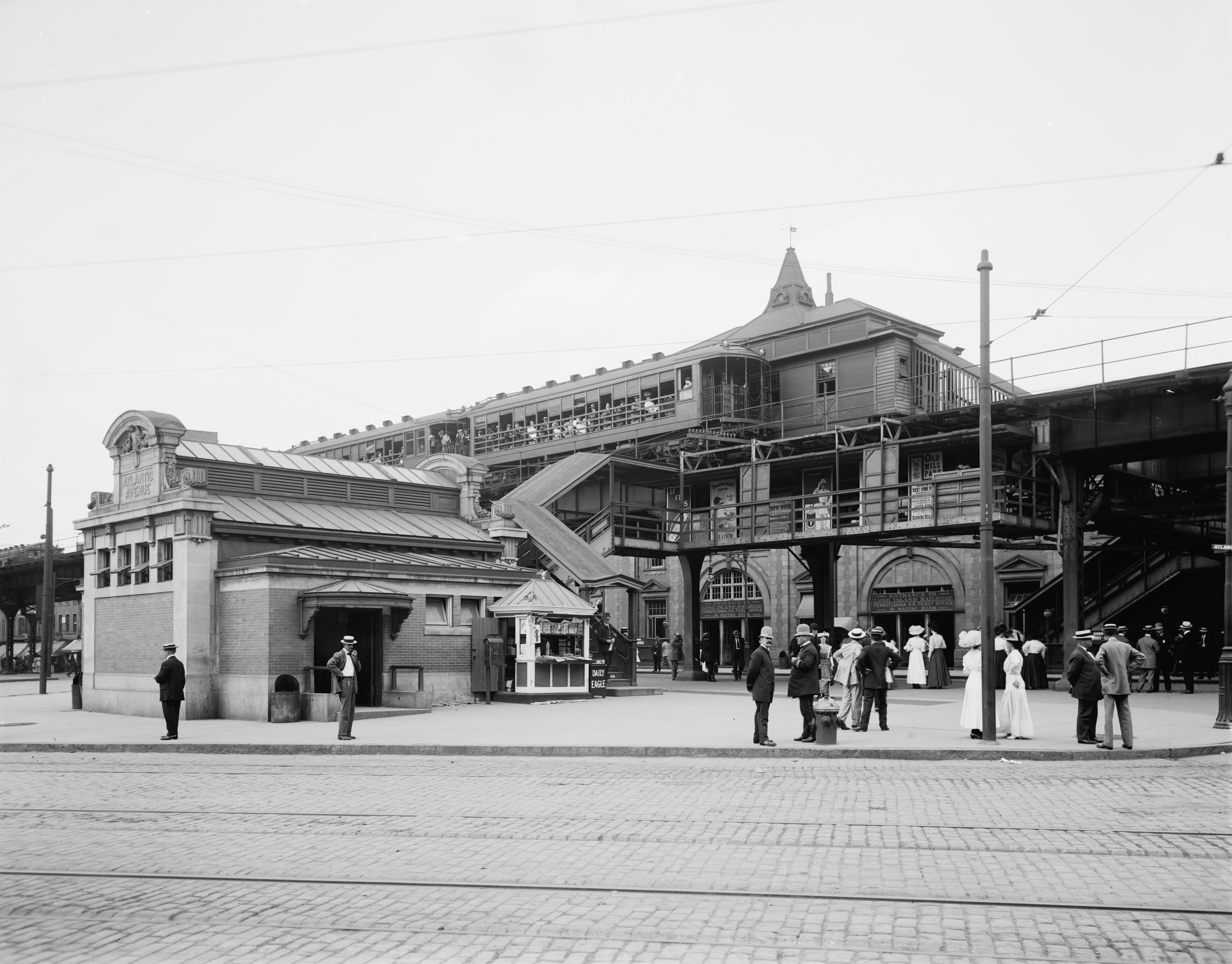
- The Fifth Avenue Line station was located right above the headhouse for this station complex

General information
- Location: Flatbush Avenue and Atlantic Avenue; Downtown Brooklyn, Brooklyn, New York
- Line: BMT Fifth Avenue Line
- Platforms: 1 island platform
- Tracks: 2

Construction
- Structure type: Elevated

History
- Opened: November 5, 1888; 138 years ago
- Closed: June 1, 1940; 86 years ago

Former services
Preceding station	BMT Lines	Following station
Fulton Street toward Sands Street	5: Culver "L" service Local	St. Marks Avenue toward Stillwell Avenue
Fulton Street toward Sands Street	6: Fifth Avenue–Bay Ridge	St. Marks Avenue toward 65th Street
Preceding station	Brooklyn Rapid Transit	Following station
Fulton Street toward Park Row	Union Elevated Fifth Avenue Line	St. Marks Avenue toward 65th Street
Fulton Street toward Park Row	Union Elevated Fifth Avenue Line	Nostrand Avenue 1899–1905 toward Rockaway Park
Location

A separate, elevated station on the BMT Fifth Avenue Line, called the Atlantic Avenue station, was also located at Flatbush Avenue and Atlantic Avenue. The elevated station opened on November 5, 1888, as part of what was then called the Hudson and Flatbush Avenue route. The station had two tracks and one island platform and was also served by trains of the BMT Culver Line and BMT Fifth Avenue Line.

Originally, only one stair descended from the platform, which split into two flights midway between the platform and the street. On June 25, 1923, eight passengers died and many others were injured when two cars of a train coming from 65th Street Terminal derailed and fell toward Flatbush Avenue. With increased use of the subways compared to the elevated lines, and the completion of the unification of the city's subway systems, the Fifth Avenue Line was closed on June 1, 1940, and was demolished in 1941.

== Ridership ==
By 1913, the Atlantic Avenue station was the busiest on the IRT system, with 23 million riders entering it every year. The station complex, including the BMT elevated station, recorded 26.8 million annual riders by 1923, of which over half used the IRT station. By the mid-1980s, six million people on average entered the subway complex every year.

The Atlantic Avenue/Pacific Street station recorded 27,559 entries on an average weekday in 2005, making it the 33rd-busiest station in the system by weekday ridership. By 2010, there were about 35,000 riders entering the station every weekday, which increased to about 41,000 in 2014. As of 2019, the Atlantic Avenue–Barclays Center system is the busiest subway station in Brooklyn, with 13,939,794 passengers, and is ranked 20th overall. This amounted to an average of 43,498 passengers per weekday. Due to the COVID-19 pandemic in New York City, ridership dropped drastically in 2020, with only 5,474,265 passengers entering the station that year. The station had 6,420,924 passengers in 2021.

== See also ==
- National Register of Historic Places listings in Brooklyn
