= Bridge–Jay Streets station =

Bridge-Jay Streets
- Former New York City Subway station

Station statistics
- Address: Myrtle Avenue and Bridge Street; Brooklyn, NY 11201
- Borough: Brooklyn
- Locale: Downtown Brooklyn
- Coordinates: 40.693774°N 73.985191°W
- Division: B (BMT)
- Services: BMT Culver Line; BMT Myrtle Avenue Line; BMT Lexington Avenue Line; BMT Fifth Avenue Line; BMT Sea Beach Line (Until 1913); BMT West End Line (Until 1916)
- Structure: Elevated
- Platforms: 1 island platform
- Tracks: 2

Other information
- Opened: April 10, 1888; 137 years ago
- Closed: May 31, 1940; 85 years ago (5th Avenue); October 13, 1950; 75 years ago (Lex Avenue); October 4, 1969; 56 years ago (Myrtle Avenue)
- Former/other names: Bridge Street (1888–1944)

Station succession
- Next west: Adams Street (1888–1944); None (1944–1969)
- Next east: Navy Street (Myrtle Avenue & Lexington Avenue); Fulton Street (5th Avenue, Culver, West End)
Location

Street map
Station service legend
Symbol	Description
Stops all times	Stops in station at all times
Stops all times except late nights	Stops all times except late nights
Stops late nights only	Stops late nights only
Stops late nights and weekends	Stops late nights and weekends only
Stops weekdays during the day	Stops weekdays during the day
Stops weekends during the day	Stops weekends during the day
Stops all times except rush hours in the peak direction	Stops all times except rush hours in the peak direction
Stops all times except weekdays in the peak direction	Stops all times except weekdays in the peak direction
Stops daily except rush hours in the peak direction	Stops all times except nights and rush hours in the peak direction
Stops rush hours only	Stops rush hours only
Stops rush hours in the peak direction only	Stops rush hours in the peak direction only
Station closed	Station is closed
(Details about time periods)

The Bridge-Jay Street station was a station on the demolished BMT Myrtle Avenue Line in Brooklyn, New York City. It had 2 tracks and 1 island platform. It was opened on April 10, 1888, as Bridge Street, and served Myrtle Avenue Line trains as well as the BMT Lexington Avenue Line, and until it was demolished in 1940, the BMT Fifth Avenue Line, which itself also served BMT Culver Line trains. From 1944 until its demolition in 1969, it had a free transfer to the IND Fulton Street and IND Culver lines at Jay Street – Borough Hall. Around that time, it was renamed "Bridge-Jay Street." The next stop to the north was Navy Street for trains traveling on the Lexington & Myrtle Avenue Lines, and Fulton Street other trains until its demolition in 1940. The next stop to the south was Adams Street. The station was closed on October 4, 1969, after a fire on the elevated structure.
