= Fifth Avenue Line (Brooklyn elevated) =

Former New York City rapid transit line

Fifth Avenue Elevated
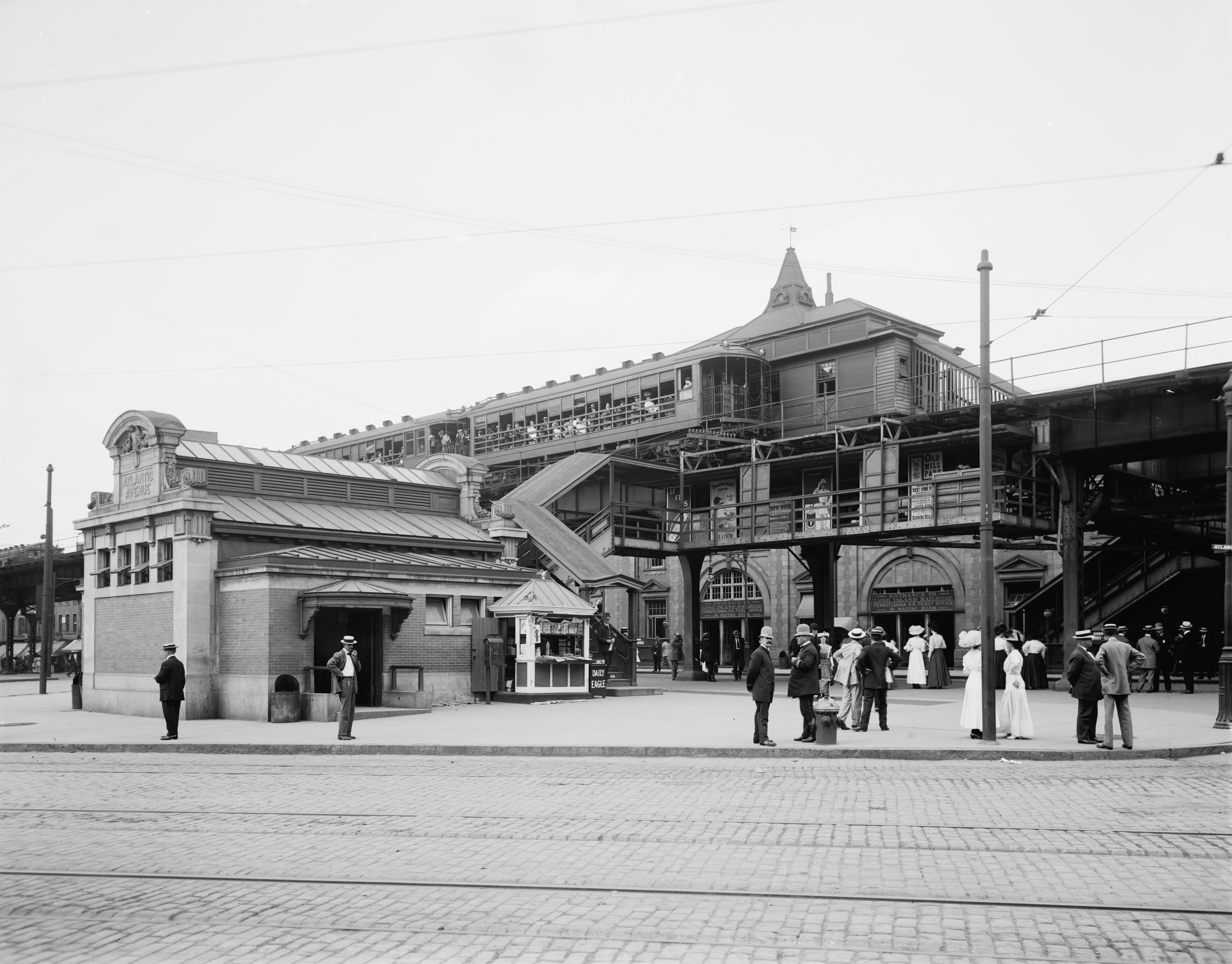
- The Atlantic Avenue station of the Fifth Avenue Elevated line.

Overview
- Other name: BMT Fifth Avenue Line
- Owner: City of New York
- Termini: Fulton Street; 65th Street

Service
- Type: Rapid transit
- System: Brooklyn–Manhattan Transit Corporation
- Operator: Brooklyn–Manhattan Transit Corporation

History
- Opened: 1888–1893
- Closed: 1940

Technical
- Num of tracks: 2
- Character: Elevated
- Track gauge: 4 ft 8 1/2 in (1,435 mm) standard gauge
- Electrification: 600 V DC third rail

The Fifth Avenue Line, also called the Fifth Avenue Elevated or Fifth Avenue–Bay Ridge Line, was an elevated rail line in Brooklyn, New York City, United States. It ran above Hudson Avenue, Flatbush Avenue, Fifth Avenue, 38th Street, and Third Avenue from Downtown Brooklyn south to Bay Ridge. The portion on Third Avenue was called the Third Avenue Elevated to distinguish service from the elevated BMT West End Line; it was separate from the elevated IRT Third Avenue Line in Manhattan and the Bronx.

== History ==
The Union Elevated Railroad Company, leased by the Brooklyn Elevated Railroad, built the Hudson Avenue Elevated, a branch of the Brooklyn Elevated Railroad's Lexington Avenue Elevated. This line split from the Brooklyn elevated at a junction at Hudson and Park Avenues (where exit 29 of the Brooklyn–Queens Expressway is now located), and traveled south above Hudson Avenue to the Long Island Rail Road's Flatbush Avenue terminal. Trains began operating between Fulton Ferry (the terminal of the Brooklyn elevated) and Flatbush Avenue on November 5, 1888.

The line crossed the BMT Myrtle Avenue Line at grade two blocks south of its merge with the Brooklyn elevated. On its second day of operation, November 6, a Hudson Avenue train crashed into a Myrtle Avenue train. Service was suspended immediately, and did not resume until June 22, 1889, when an extension south to Third Street was completed, and a new connection into Myrtle Avenue opened, taking trains between Third Street and Sands Street at the end of the Myrtle Avenue Line, and replacing the four track crossings with one. The unused two blocks north of Myrtle Avenue were placed back in service on December 9, 1889, when Myrtle Avenue trains began to use it to reach Fulton Ferry via the old Brooklyn elevated.

An extension south to 25th Street at Greenwood Cemetery was opened at 4 p.m. on August 15, 1889. At this new terminal, elevated passengers could transfer to the north end of the Brooklyn, Bath and West End Railroad for Coney Island. A further extension to 36th Street, at a new Union Depot serving the West End Line and Prospect Park and Coney Island Railroad (Culver Line) to Coney Island, opened on May 29, 1890. The Long Island Rail Road (LIRR) had service on the elevated line from Brooklyn Bridge, through Atlantic and Flatbush Avenues to the 36th Street Union Depot, connecting with the Manhattan Beach Line starting in 1895.

The Seaside and Brooklyn Bridge Elevated Railroad was organized on March 18, 1890 to extend the Fifth Avenue Elevated south to Fort Hamilton, to extend the Lexington Avenue Elevated from Van Siclen Avenue east to the city line, and to build in High Street at the Brooklyn Bridge (this became part of the Sands Street station loop). The extension of the Fifth Avenue Elevated, along Fifth Avenue, 38th Street, and Third Avenue, opened to 65th Street on October 1, 1893.

On June 25, 1923, two cars of a northbound train derailed and fell towards Flatbush Avenue. Eight passengers died and many were injured. At midnight on June 1, 1940, service on the Fifth Avenue Elevated ended as required by the unification of the city's three subway companies.

On September 15, 1941, the demolition of the Fifth Avenue Elevated started at 35th Street and Fifth Avenue, and it was completed by November of that year. The section of the elevated on Third Avenue from 38th Street to 65th Street was used as part of the elevated highway approach, the Gowanus Expressway, to the Brooklyn–Battery Tunnel. In total, three miles of the elevated were scrapped, with the work being done by the Harris Structural Steel Company.

== Station listing ==
Fifth Avenue trains served Park Row, Sands Street, Adams Street, and Bridge–Jay Streets before leaving the Myrtle Avenue Line.

Name	Opened	Closed	Notes
Fulton Street	July 27, 1889	June 1, 1940	connection to Fulton Street elevated trains and Fulton Street Line, DeKalb Avenue Line, and Flatbush Avenue Line streetcars
Atlantic Avenue	November 5, 1888	June 1, 1940	connection to Long Island Rail Road Atlantic Division trains at Flatbush Avenue and St. Johns Place Line, Flatbush Avenue Line, Third Avenue Line, and Seventh Avenue Line streetcars
St. Marks Avenue	June 22, 1889	June 1, 1940	connection to Bergen Street Line streetcars
Union Street	June 22, 1889	June 1, 1940	connection to Union Street Line streetcars
Third Street	June 22, 1889	June 1, 1940	
Ninth Street	August 15, 1889	June 1, 1940	connection to Smith and Ninth Streets Line and Hamilton Avenue Line streetcars
16th Street	August 15, 1889	June 1, 1940	connection to 15th Street Line streetcars
20th Street	August 15, 1889	June 1, 1940	
25th Street	August 15, 1889	June 1, 1940	
36th Street	May 29, 1890	June 1, 1940	connection to West End Line trains
40th Street	October 1, 1893	June 1, 1940	connection to Church Avenue Line, 39th Street and Coney Island Line, 39th Street and Manhattan Beach Line, and 39th Street and Ulmer Park Line streetcars
46th Street	October 1, 1893	June 1, 1940	
52nd Street	October 1, 1893	June 1, 1940	
58th Street	October 1, 1893	June 1, 1940	
65th Street	October 1, 1893	June 1, 1940	connection to Sea Beach Line, Bay Ridge Suburban Line, Bay Ridge Line, Third Avenue Line, and 86th Street Suburban Line streetcars
