= Sands Street station =

Sands St.
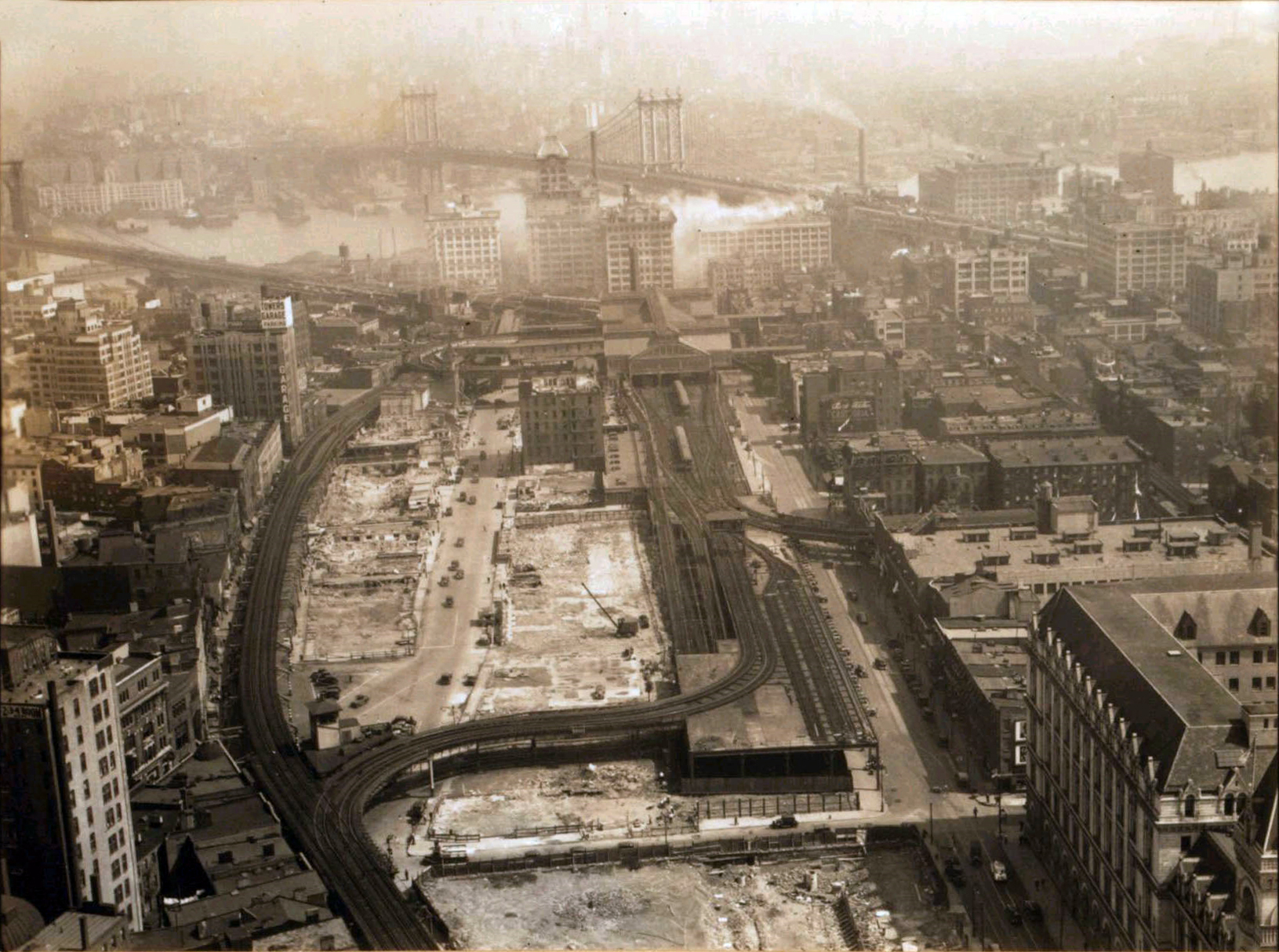
- Aerial view of Sands Street station in 1936

General information
- Location: Brooklyn Bridge Boulevard and Sands Street; Brooklyn Heights, Brooklyn, New York
- Coordinates: 40.699943°N 73.988345°W
- Line: BMT Myrtle Avenue Line
- Platforms: 2 island platforms (upper level); 5 island platforms and 5 side platforms (lower level)
- Tracks: 12 (4 upper level, 8 lower level)

Construction
- Structure type: Elevated

History
- Opened: September 1, 1888; 137 years ago
- Closed: March 5, 1944; 82 years ago
- Former names: Brooklyn Bridge

Former services in 1939
Preceding station	BMT Lines	Following station
Terminus	5: Culver "L" service	Adams Street toward Stillwell Avenue
Terminus	6: Fifth Avenue–Bay Ridge	Adams Street toward 65th Street
Terminus	11: Myrtle Avenue	Adams Street toward Metropolitan Avenue
Park Row Terminus	12: Lexington Avenue	Adams Street toward Eastern Parkway
Park Row Terminus	13: Fulton Street Express	Franklin Avenue toward Lefferts Avenue
Park Row Terminus	13: Fulton Street Local	Court Street toward Lefferts Avenue
Location

Sands Street was a station on the demolished BMT Myrtle Avenue Line. It was a large complex with two levels.

The lower level served trains going to Park Row in Manhattan via the Brooklyn Bridge Elevated Line. It had four tracks and two island platforms, with the outer platform faces serving streetcars.

The upper level had a terminal and a loop for terminating trains. The Sands Street Terminal had four tracks and three island platforms and a side platform located to the east. This was to the west of the loop tracks and platforms.

The Sands Street Loop had platforms on High Street (one island and two side platforms with two tracks) and on Sands Street (also two tracks and one island and two side platforms).

The next stop to the south was:

- Adams Street for trains that used the BMT Myrtle Avenue Line, including the BMT West End Line until 1916, the BMT Lexington Avenue Line, until the close of the station, the BMT Sea Beach Line's predecessor, until 1913, and the BMT Fifth Avenue Line until its closure in 1940 and
- Court Street for trains using the BMT Fulton Street Line, until 1940, including, until 1920, BMT Brighton Line trains.

The next stop and terminal to the north was Park Row for trains serving Manhattan. Trains on the upper level loop terminated at Sands Street.

It closed on March 5, 1944.
