= 6 (BMT rapid transit service) =

Former New York City Subway service

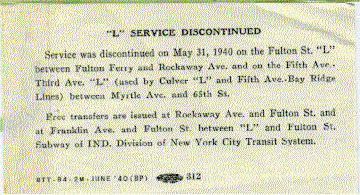
The service advisory discontinuing 6 service

6 was the BMT's designation for trains that used the BMT Fifth Avenue Line (labeled the Fifth Avenue–Bay Ridge Line).

When numbers were assigned in 1924, 6 was assigned to trains between Sands Street (on the Brooklyn side of the Brooklyn Bridge) and 65th Street, via the BMT Myrtle Avenue Line, BMT Third Avenue Line, and BMT Fifth Avenue Line.

Between 1931 and 1937, all service except rush hour and Saturday morning service was truncated to 36th Street, where transfer could be made to a Culver Line (5) train to downtown Brooklyn. On May 31, 1940, the Third Avenue and Fifth Avenue lines were closed, ending all 6 service. The 6 designation is now used for the IRT Lexington Avenue and Pelham local service.
