= 65th Street station (BMT Fifth Avenue Line) =

65th St.

General information
- Location: 3rd Avenue and 65th Street; Sunset Park, Brooklyn, New York
- Coordinates: 40°38′21.25″N 74°1′24.9″W
- Line: BMT Fifth Avenue Line
- Platforms: 1 island platform
- Tracks: 2

Construction
- Structure type: Elevated

History
- Opened: October 1, 1893; 133 years ago
- Closed: May 31, 1940; 86 years ago

Former services
Preceding station	BMT Lines	Following station
58th Street toward Sands Street	6: Fifth Avenue–Bay Ridge	Terminus
Location

The 65th Street station was a station on the demolished section of the BMT Fifth Avenue Line in Brooklyn, New York City. It was served by trains of the BMT Fifth Avenue Line, and despite the name of the line, it was actually located at Third Avenue and 65th Street. It had two tracks and one island platform. The station had connections to the Bay Ridge Suburban Line, Bay Ridge Line, Third Avenue Line, and 86th Street Suburban Line trolleys. Today, the western terminus of the Belt Parkway at the interchange with the Gowanus Expressway can be found in the vicinity.

== History ==
An extension of the Fifth Avenue Elevated, along Fifth Avenue, 38th Street, and Third Avenue, opened to 65th Street on October 1, 1893.

At midnight on June 1, 1940, service on the Fifth Avenue Elevated ended as required by the unification of the city's three subway companies.

On September 15, 1941, the demolition of the Fifth Avenue Elevated started at 35th Street and Fifth Avenue, and it was completed by November of that year. The section of the elevated on Third Avenue from 38th Street to 65th Street was used as part of the elevated highway approach, the Gowanus Expressway, to the Brooklyn–Battery Tunnel. In total, three miles of the Elevated was scrapped, with the work being done by the Harris Structural Steel Company.
