= Nostrand Avenue station (BMT Lexington Avenue Line) =

Nostrand Ave.

General information
- Location: Lexington Avenue and Nostrand Avenue; Bedford-Stuyvesant, Brooklyn, New York
- Coordinates: 40.687677°N 73.951038°W
- Operator: City of New York (from 1940)
- Line: BMT Lexington Avenue Line
- Platforms: 2 side platforms
- Tracks: 2
- Connections: Nostrand Avenue and Lorimer Street Trolleys

Construction
- Structure type: Elevated

History
- Opened: May 13, 1885; 141 years ago
- Closed: October 13, 1950; 75 years ago

Former services
Preceding station	BMT Lines	Following station
Franklin Avenue toward Park Row	12: Lexington Avenue	Tompkins Avenue toward Eastern Parkway
Location

The Nostrand Avenue station was a station on the demolished BMT Lexington Avenue Line in Brooklyn, New York City. It was opened on May 13, 1885, and had two tracks and two side platforms. It was located at the intersection of Lexington Avenue and Nostrand Avenue. It also had connections to the Nostrand Avenue Line and Lorimer Street Line streetcars. The station closed on October 13, 1950. The next southbound stop was Franklin Avenue. The next northbound stop was Tompkins Avenue. The current site of the station is mostly residential with the exception of storefronts along the first floors of brownstones on the southeast corner of the intersection.
