= Franklin Avenue Station =

Franklin Avenue Station can refer to:

- Franklin Avenue station (Fulton Street) a station complex in Brooklyn, New York City consisting of:
  - Franklin Avenue station (IND Fulton Street Line); served by the A and C trains
  - Franklin Avenue station (BMT Franklin Avenue Line); served by the S (Franklin Avenue Shuttle) train
- Franklin Avenue/Botanic Garden station a station complex in Brooklyn, New York City consisting of:
  - Franklin Avenue–Medgar Evers College station; served by the 2, 3, 4, and 5 trains
  - Botanic Garden station; served by the S (Franklin Avenue Shuttle) train
- Franklin Avenue station (BMT Lexington Avenue Line), a demolished station in Brooklyn, New York City
- Franklin Avenue station (BMT Myrtle Avenue Line), a demolished station in Brooklyn, New York City
- Franklin Avenue station (Metro Transit) in Minneapolis, Minnesota
