= Greene Avenue station =

Greene Ave.

General information
- Location: Grand Avenue and Greene Avenue; Clinton Hill, Brooklyn, New York
- Coordinates: 40.687090°N 73.962548°W
- Operator: City of New York (from 1940)
- Line: BMT Lexington Avenue Line
- Platforms: 2 side platforms
- Connections: Greene and Gates Avenues Line

Construction
- Structure type: Elevated

History
- Opened: May 13, 1885; 141 years ago
- Closed: October 13, 1950; 75 years ago

Former services
Preceding station	BMT Lines	Following station
DeKalb Avenue toward Park Row	12: Lexington Avenue	Franklin Avenue toward Eastern Parkway
Location

The Greene Avenue station was a station on the demolished BMT Lexington Avenue Line in Brooklyn, New York City. It was originally built on May 13, 1885, and had two tracks and two side platforms. It was located at the intersection of Lexington Avenue and Greene Avenue, and had a connection to the former Green and Gates Avenue trolley line. The station was close to the current Clinton and Washington Avenues station on the underground IND Crosstown Line. It closed on October 13, 1950. The next southbound stop was DeKalb Avenue. The next northbound stop was Franklin Avenue.
