= Myrtle Avenue (disambiguation) =

Myrtle Avenue is a street in Queens, New York City.

Myrtle Avenue may also refer to:

== Streets ==
- Myrtle Avenue, Hounslow, close to Heathrow Airport

== New York City Subway stations ==
- Myrtle Avenue (BMT Jamaica Line), aka Myrtle Avenue–Broadway and serving the J, M, and Z trains
- Myrtle Avenue (BMT Fourth Avenue Line), now closed
- Myrtle Avenue (BMT Lexington Avenue Line), demolished
- Court Street–Myrtle Avenue (BMT Fulton Street Line), demolished
- BMT Myrtle Avenue Line, the remainder of the Myrtle Avenue elevated

== Long Island Rail Road ==
- Myrtle Avenue station (LIRR Evergreen Branch), demolished
- Myrtle Avenue station (LIRR Bay Ridge Branch), removed
