= Myrtle Avenue station (BMT Lexington Avenue Line) =

Myrtle Ave.

General information
- Location: Grand Avenue and Myrtle Avenue; Clinton Hill, Brooklyn, New York
- Coordinates: 40.6937°N 73.96411°W
- Operator: City of New York (from 1940)
- Line: BMT Lexington Avenue Line
- Platforms: 2 side platforms
- Tracks: 2 (Lower level)
- Connections: Grand Avenue station (11 train)

Construction
- Structure type: Elevated

History
- Opened: May 13, 1885; 141 years ago
- Closed: October 13, 1950; 75 years ago

Former services
Preceding station	BMT Lines	Following station
Washington Avenue toward Park Row	12: Lexington Avenue	DeKalb Avenue toward Eastern Parkway
Location

The Myrtle Avenue station was a station on the demolished BMT Lexington Avenue Line in Brooklyn, New York City. It was opened on May 13, 1885, and had two tracks and two side platforms. It was located at the intersection of Myrtle Avenue and Grand Avenue, and had connections to Myrtle Avenue Line streetcars. A segment of the Lexington Avenue Line once ran north from here and turned west on Park Avenue to Hudson Avenue and York Street on its way to the Fulton Ferry until 1891. The Myrtle Avenue Elevated was built nearby in 1888, and Lexington Avenue Lines trains began to shift onto that line southwest of this station. It closed on October 13, 1950, although the other BMT station at that location, Grand Avenue was in operation until January 21, 1953, while the rest of the line southwest of Broadway was operational until November 3, 1969. The next southbound stop was Washington Avenue on the Myrtle Avenue El, but was originally another Washington Avenue station on the Park Avenue El. The next northbound stop was DeKalb Avenue.
