= Franklin Avenue station (BMT Lexington Avenue Line) =

Franklin Ave.

General information
- Location: Lexington Avenue and Franklin Avenue; Bedford-Stuyvesant, Brooklyn, New York
- Coordinates: 40.6870°N 73.9568°W
- Operator: City of New York (from 1940)
- Line: BMT Lexington Avenue Line
- Platforms: 2 side platforms
- Tracks: 2
- Connections: Franklin, and Greene & Gates Avenue Streetcars

Construction
- Structure type: Elevated

History
- Opened: May 13, 1885; 141 years ago
- Closed: October 13, 1950; 75 years ago

Former services
| Preceding station | BMT Lines | Following station |
|---|---|---|
| Greene Avenue toward Park Row | 12: Lexington Avenue | Nostrand Avenue toward Eastern Parkway |
Location

The Franklin Avenue station was a station on the demolished BMT Lexington Avenue Line in Brooklyn, New York City. It had 2 tracks and 2 side platforms. The station was originally built on May 13, 1885. It was located at the intersection of Lexington Avenue and Franklin Avenue in Brooklyn. The station had connections to two trolley lines; One was the Franklin Avenue Line and other was the Greene and Gates Avenues Line. It closed on October 13, 1950. The next southbound stop was Greene Avenue. The next northbound stop was Nostrand Avenue.
