= Lexington Avenue Line =

Lexington Avenue Line refers to the following transit lines:

- IRT Lexington Avenue Line (rapid transit), in Manhattan
- BMT Lexington Avenue Line (former rapid transit), in Brooklyn
