= DeKalb Avenue (disambiguation) =

DeKalb Avenue is a street in the New York City boroughs of Brooklyn and Queens.

DeKalb Avenue or DeKalb Avenue station may also refer to:

- DeKalb Avenue station (BMT Canarsie Line), a New York City Subway station in Bushwick, Brooklyn
- DeKalb Avenue station (BMT Lexington Avenue Line), a former New York City Subway station
- DeKalb Avenue station (BMT lines), a New York City Subway station on the BMT Brighton and Fourth Avenue Lines in Downtown Brooklyn
- Ridgewood station (LIRR Evergreen Branch) or DeKalb Avenue station, a former Long Island Rail Road station in Ridgewood, Queens
- DeKalb Avenue Line, a public transit route in Brooklyn, now the B38 bus
