= DeKalb Avenue station (BMT Lexington Avenue Line) =

DeKalb Ave.

General information
- Location: Grand Avenue and DeKalb Avenue; Clinton Hill, Brooklyn, New York
- Coordinates: 40.6900°N 73.9633°W
- Operator: City of New York (from 1940)
- Line: BMT Lexington Avenue Line
- Platforms: 2 side platforms
- Tracks: 2
- Connections: DeKalb Avenue Line

Construction
- Structure type: Elevated

History
- Opened: May 13, 1885; 141 years ago
- Closed: October 13, 1950; 75 years ago

Former services
Preceding station	BMT Lines	Following station
Myrtle Avenue toward Park Row	12: Lexington Avenue	Greene Avenue toward Eastern Parkway
Location

The DeKalb Avenue station was a station on the demolished BMT Lexington Avenue Line in Brooklyn, New York City. It was opened on May 13, 1885, and had two tracks and two side platforms. It was located at the intersection of Grand Avenue and DeKalb Avenue, and had connections to the streetcar line with the same name. It closed on October 13, 1950. The next southbound stop was Myrtle Avenue. The next northbound stop was Greene Avenue.
