= Washington Avenue station =

Washington Avenue
- Former New York City Subway station

Station statistics
- Address: Myrtle Avenue and Washington Avenue; Brooklyn, NY 11205
- Borough: Brooklyn
- Locale: Clinton Hill
- Coordinates: 40.6933°N 73.9669°W
- Division: B (BMT)
- Services: BMT Myrtle Avenue Line
- Structure: Elevated
- Platforms: 1 island platform
- Tracks: 2

Other information
- Opened: December 4, 1888; 136 years ago
- Closed: October 4, 1969; 56 years ago

Station succession
- Next west: Vanderbilt Avenue
- Next east: Grand Avenue (Myrtle); Myrtle Avenue (Lexington)
Location

Street map
Station service legend
Symbol	Description
Stops all times	Stops in station at all times
Stops all times except late nights	Stops all times except late nights
Stops late nights only	Stops late nights only
Stops late nights and weekends	Stops late nights and weekends only
Stops weekdays during the day	Stops weekdays during the day
Stops weekends during the day	Stops weekends during the day
Stops all times except rush hours in the peak direction	Stops all times except rush hours in the peak direction
Stops all times except weekdays in the peak direction	Stops all times except weekdays in the peak direction
Stops daily except rush hours in the peak direction	Stops all times except nights and rush hours in the peak direction
Stops rush hours only	Stops rush hours only
Stops rush hours in the peak direction only	Stops rush hours in the peak direction only
Station closed	Station is closed
(Details about time periods)

The Washington Avenue station was a station on the demolished BMT Myrtle Avenue Line and BMT Lexington Avenue Line in Brooklyn, New York City. It was opened on December 4, 1888, and had two tracks and one island platform. The next stop to the north was Grand Avenue, and until 1950, the next stop to the north for trains destined for points on the BMT Lexington Avenue Line was Myrtle Avenue. The next stop to the south was Vanderbilt Avenue for both lines. It closed on October 4, 1969, after a fire on the structure.
