= Grand Avenue station (BMT Myrtle Avenue Line) =

Grand Ave.

General information
- Location: Myrtle Avenue and Grand Avenue; Clinton Hill, Brooklyn, New York
- Coordinates: 40.693661°N 73.964061°W
- Operator: City of New York (from 1940)
- Line: BMT Myrtle Avenue Line
- Platforms: 2 side platforms
- Tracks: 2
- Connections: Myrtle Avenue station (12 train)

Construction
- Structure type: Elevated

History
- Opened: April 27, 1889; 137 years ago
- Closed: January 21, 1953; 73 years ago

Former services
Preceding station	BMT Lines	Following station
Washington Avenue toward Sands Street	11: Myrtle Avenue	Franklin Avenue toward Metropolitan Avenue
Location

The Grand Avenue station was a station on the demolished section of the BMT Myrtle Avenue Line in Brooklyn, New York City. The station was opened on April 27, 1889, at the intersection of Myrtle Avenue and Grand Avenue in Brooklyn next to the Myrtle Avenue station of the BMT Lexington Avenue Line, which opened four years earlier. It had two tracks and two side platforms, and had connections not only to that station, but also to Myrtle Avenue Line streetcars. The next southbound stop was Washington Avenue. The next northbound stop was Franklin Avenue. The connection to the Lexington Avenue el station lasted until that station closed on October 13, 1950. Grand Avenue closed on January 21, 1953, while the rest of the line southwest of Broadway was operational until October 4, 1969.
