= BMT Lexington Avenue Line =

Former New York City rapid transit line

Lexington Avenue Elevated
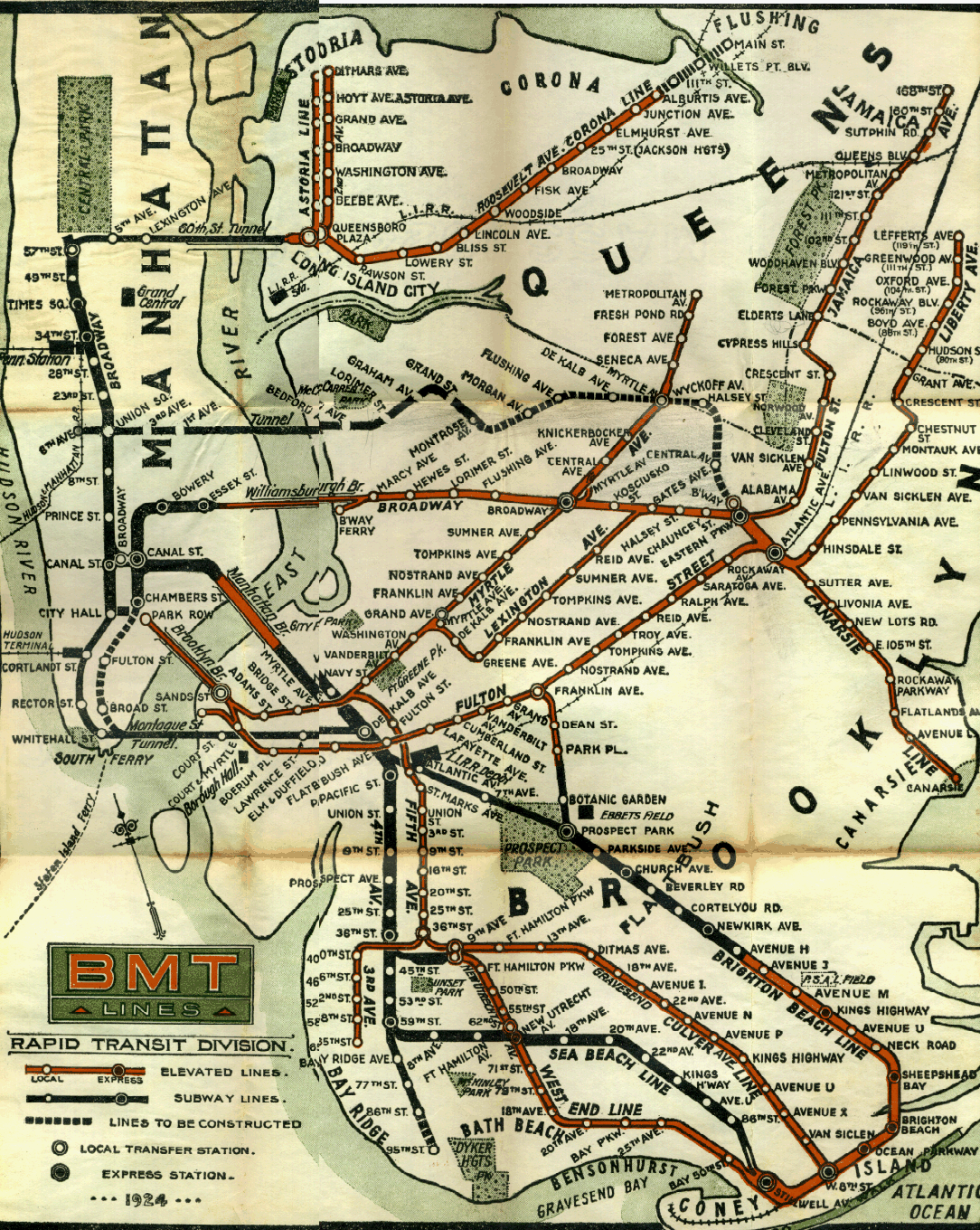
- A 1924 BMT route map; the Lexington Avenue El is at center.

Overview
- Other name: BMT Lexington Avenue Line
- Owner: City of New York
- Termini: Fulton Street; 65th Street

Service
- Type: Rapid transit
- System: Brooklyn–Manhattan Transit Corporation
- Operator: Brooklyn–Manhattan Transit Corporation

History
- Opened: 1885–1893
- Closed: 1889 (Park Avenue Elevated); 1950 (section west of Gates Avenue)

Technical
- Number of tracks: 2
- Character: Elevated
- Track gauge: 4 ft 8 1/2 in (1,435 mm)

The BMT Lexington Avenue Line (also called the Lexington Avenue Elevated) was the first standard elevated railway in Brooklyn, New York, operated in its later days by the Brooklyn Rapid Transit Company, the Brooklyn–Manhattan Transit Corporation, and then the City of New York.

The original line, as it existed at the end of 1885, traveled from Fulton Ferry in Downtown Brooklyn east to East New York, passing over York Street, turning right onto Hudson Avenue (which is now a pedestrian walkway within the Farrugut Houses), left onto Park Avenue, right onto Grand Avenue, left onto Lexington Avenue, right onto Broadway, and slight left onto Fulton Street.

The structure above Broadway and Fulton Street is now part of the BMT Jamaica Line. The original structure east of Alabama Avenue in East New York still exists, although it has been rebuilt to support subway cars, which are heavier than the former elevated cars. The remaining elevated structure is the oldest such structure in the subway system.

== History ==
The Brooklyn Elevated Railroad opened the line to passengers at 16:00 on May 13, 1885, with a five-cent fare for trains every five minutes. The original line ran from York and Washington Streets (near the Brooklyn Bridge) along York Street, Hudson Avenue, Park Avenue, Grand Avenue, Lexington Avenue, and Broadway to Gates Avenue. The three stations on Park Avenue had island platforms, while all the other stations had two side platforms.

The first extension, east to Manhattan Beach Crossing in East New York, named for the crossing of the Manhattan Beach Division of the Long Island Rail Road, opened at 09:00 on June 14, 1885. Arrangements were made with the LIRR for joint tickets to Manhattan Beach, as well as with the Grand Street, Prospect Park and Flatbush Railroad (Franklin Avenue Line of streetcars) and Brooklyn, Flatbush and Coney Island Railway (Brighton Beach Line) to Brighton Beach. Other connections at East New York included the Long Island Rail Road towards the east, the Brooklyn and Rockaway Beach Railroad (Canarsie Line), and the New York, Woodhaven and Rockaway Railroad. Shops, car houses, and other facilities were located at East New York, where the New York City Subway's East New York Yard still stands.

On September 5, 1885, the line was extended one more station to Alabama Avenue near the Howard House, a union station for the steam and horse railroads into East New York. Another east terminal at Van Siclen Avenue was opened on December 3, 1885, with the structure above Fulton Street extending east two more blocks to Schenck Street. After a half day of infrequent service, trains began serving the new station on a regular schedule the next morning.

Several weeks before the line was completed to Van Siclen Avenue, the western terminal at Fulton Ferry was opened at noon on November 11, 1885. This portion of the line was built above York Street to just shy of the bridge, where it turned northwest parallel to the bridge, not turning back west under the bridge until Plymouth Street at the East River. That same day, a covered walkway above Washington Street from the inbound platform of the York and Washington Streets station to the Brooklyn Bridge was opened.

Brooklyn Elevated Railroad leased the newer Union Elevated Railroad, which had yet to run a train, on May 13, 1887. However, the two companies, despite sharing large portions of their lines, remained technically separate, commonly called the "Brooklyn and Union Elevated Railroads", until they merged in October 1890 and kept the Brooklyn Elevated Railroad name.

On April 10, 1888, Union Elevated opened the first piece of the Myrtle Avenue elevated, from Adams Street at City Hall east over Myrtle Avenue to Grand Avenue, where it junctioned with the Brooklyn elevated. The company operated through to the end of the Brooklyn elevated at Van Siclen Avenue. Another branch operated by Union Elevated, the Broadway elevated from Gates Avenue northwest to Driggs Avenue in Williamsburg, opened on June 25, 1888. This was extended to Broadway Ferry on July 14, 1888. The Myrtle Avenue elevated was extended north over Adams Street to Sands Street at the Brooklyn Bridge on September 1, 1888, and the Union elevated began running between Sands Street and Van Siclen Avenue. Union Elevated opened the Hudson Avenue elevated, a branch of the Brooklyn elevated from the intersection of Hudson and Park Avenues south to the Long Island Rail Road's Flatbush Avenue terminal, on November 5, 1888, and began operating between Fulton Ferry and Flatbush Avenue.

Another piece of the Myrtle Avenue elevated, from the crossing of the Brooklyn elevated at Grand Avenue east to Broadway, opened on April 27, 1889. Trains on this route did not cross the line on Grand Avenue, but turned onto Grand Avenue and used the Brooklyn elevated to Fulton Ferry. Simultaneously, the original Brooklyn elevated route via Lexington Avenue to Fulton Ferry was discontinued, with all Lexington Avenue trains running over Myrtle Avenue to the Brooklyn Bridge, and passengers for the ferry required to transfer at Myrtle Avenue station via several stairways.

Effective December 9, 1889, a new service pattern went into effect, in which the structure above Park Avenue and its three stations, two of them located one long block north of Myrtle Avenue stations, were closed. Myrtle Avenue trains, which had used this structure since April 27, instead continued along Myrtle Avenue to Hudson Avenue, turning north there via a new junction into the Hudson Avenue elevated, closed north of Myrtle Avenue since shortly after it opened due to safety concerns with the at-grade crossing at Myrtle Avenue. Thus passengers transferring between the two lines could disembark at Navy Street and simply enter the next train on the other route. The company continued to operate one daily train, closed to passengers, over Park Avenue, "to satisfy, it is thought, legal requirements", according to the Brooklyn Daily Eagle.

The structure above Park Avenue, closed to passengers since late 1889, was finally removed in late 1891. The New York State Board of Railroad Commissioners approved its abandonment on late December 1891, and removal soon began of the entire portion on Park Avenue, from the Hudson Avenue Elevated east to Grand Avenue, as well as the portion above Grand Avenue north of the Myrtle Avenue Elevated. This was the only part of the New York City elevated system to be permanently closed without ever having been electrified. By August 9, 1900, the rest of the line was electrified with third rail.

An extension of the Brooklyn elevated east to Cypress Hills, over Fulton Street and Crescent Street, opened on May 30, 1893, and the Brooklyn Union elevated extended both Lexington Avenue Line and Broadway Line trains to the new terminal. This extension incorporated portions of the old structure over Park Avenue.

The original Brooklyn elevated over Hudson Avenue and York Street to Fulton Ferry, only used by Myrtle Avenue elevated trains after 1889, was closed on April 11, 1904.

On April 27, 1950 it was announced that the line would be demolished at the suggestion of the Board of Transportation and the Brooklyn Borough President John Cashmore. Cashmore, following the line's demolition, wanted to widen the street to become a major traffic artery. The demolition of the line was expected to save $781,000 annually. Patronage on the line had decreased to 7,337 daily passengers, and the fare booths on the line were closed between 9 p.m. and 5 a.m., requiring conductors to collect fares onboard. The last Lexington Avenue train ran at 9 p.m. on October 13, 1950, with a small celebration, 65 years after the line opened. Transportation Commissioner G. Joseph Minetti joked that "if we had this many passengers riding regularly we wouldn't have to shut it down." Demolition began on November 1. Former riders of the Lexington Avenue Line were encouraged to use bus service along Gates and DeKalb Avenues or to use the IND Crosstown Line subway.

== Service patterns ==
The original service pattern was a single line from Fulton Ferry to East New York. On April 27, 1889, all Lexington Avenue trains began using the Myrtle Avenue elevated to Sands Street at the Brooklyn Bridge, while the old portion above Park Avenue, Hudson Avenue, and other streets to Fulton Ferry became part of the outer Myrtle Avenue service. The Park Avenue structure was last used on December 8, 1889, but Myrtle Avenue trains continued to use the line on Hudson Avenue to Fulton Ferry. All Lexington Avenue trains served Sands Street after 1889, but Myrtle Avenue trains began alternating between Fulton Ferry and Sands Street on April 10, 1899, in order to avoid the transferring of Myrtle Avenue passengers to trains bound for the bridge. Lexington Avenue trains were extended from Sands Street over the Brooklyn Bridge to Park Row in June 1898. This pattern remained until the line to Fulton Ferry closed on April 11, 1904.

From 1904 until the abandonment of service on October 13, 1950, the Lexington Avenue service pattern (labeled 12 after 1924) was relatively simple. Trains began at either Park Row in Lower Manhattan or Sands Street in Downtown Brooklyn, and ran along the Broadway elevated at least to East New York and sometimes to Jamaica.

== Station listing ==
=== Original line from Fulton Ferry ===
Beginning on April 27, 1889, all Lexington Avenue trains used the Myrtle Avenue elevated west of Myrtle Avenue station, and this line was only used by Myrtle Avenue trains.

Name	Location	Opened	Closed	Notes
Fulton Ferry	Fulton Ferry	November 11, 1885	April 11, 1904	Separate terminal adjacent to the terminal of BMT Fulton Street Line, line between Fulton Ferry and Washington Street is along ROW on the north side of the Brooklyn Bridge
York and Washington Streets	York Street and Washington Street	May 13, 1885	April 11, 1904	Connection to the Brooklyn Bridge and New York and Brooklyn Bridge Railway
Bridge Street	York Street and Bridge Street	May 13, 1885	April 11, 1904	
Navy Street	Park Avenue and Navy Street	May 13, 1885	December 8, 1889	
Cumberland Street	Park Avenue and Cumberland Street	May 13, 1885	December 8, 1889	
Washington Avenue	Park Avenue and Washington Avenue	May 13, 1885	December 8, 1889	

=== Later line from the Brooklyn Bridge ===
Lexington Avenue trains were moved to this route on April 27, 1889, joining the old route just west of Myrtle Avenue station.

==== Demolished section ====
This section of the line closed in three stages. Service past Bridge–Jay Streets ended in 1944. Service on the section shared with the BMT Myrtle Avenue Line ended in 1969 when that line closed, 19 years after the BMT Lexington Avenue Line itself was demolished between Washington Avenue on the Myrtle Avenue Line and Gates Avenue on the Jamaica Line.

Name	Opened	Closed	Notes
Manhattan
Park Row	June 1898	March 5, 1944	
Brooklyn
Sands Street	September 1, 1888	March 5, 1944	
Adams Street	April 10, 1888	March 5, 1944	
Bridge–Jay Street	April 10, 1888	October 4, 1969	Free transfers were offered to the IND Fulton Street Line at Jay Street – Borough Hall (present day A, C, and F and <F> trains) after 1944.
Navy Street	April 10, 1888	October 4, 1969	
Vanderbilt Avenue	April 10, 1888	October 4, 1969	
Washington Avenue	April 10, 1888	October 4, 1969	
Myrtle Avenue	May 13, 1885	October 13, 1950	connection to Myrtle Avenue elevated trains and Myrtle Avenue Line streetcars
DeKalb Avenue	May 13, 1885	October 13, 1950	connection to DeKalb Avenue Line streetcars
Greene Avenue	May 13, 1885	October 13, 1950	connection to Greene and Gates Avenues Line streetcars
Franklin Avenue	May 13, 1885	October 13, 1950	connection to Franklin Avenue Line and Greene and Gates Avenues Line streetcars
Nostrand Avenue	May 13, 1885	October 13, 1950	connection to Nostrand Avenue Line and Lorimer Street Line streetcars
Tompkins Avenue	May 13, 1885	October 13, 1950	connection to Tompkins Avenue Line, Marcy Avenue Line, and Ocean Avenue Line streetcars
Sumner Avenue	May 13, 1885	October 13, 1950	connection to Sumner Avenue Line streetcars
Reid Avenue	May 13, 1885	October 13, 1950	connection to Utica and Reid Avenues Line streetcars

==== BMT Jamaica Line ====
Just before Gates Avenue, Lexington Avenue trains joined the BMT Jamaica Line. The section of the BMT Jamaica Line used by Lexington Avenue trains is now used by the J and Z trains. The former connection to the BMT Lexington Avenue Line can be seen just west of Gates Avenue.

Name	Opened	Closed	Notes
Gates Avenue	May 13, 1885	present	connection to Broadway elevated trains and Broadway Line, Greene and Gates Avenues Line, and Ralph Avenue Line streetcars
Halsey Street	August 19, 1885	present	connection to Broadway Line and Putnam Avenue Line streetcars
Chauncey Street	July 18, 1885	present	connection to Broadway Line and Wilson Avenue Line streetcars
Manhattan Beach Crossing	June 14, 1885	present	now named Broadway Junction; connection to the BMT Canarsie Line and IND Fulton Street Line (present day A and C, L trains).
Alabama Avenue	September 5, 1885	present	
Van Siclen Avenue	December 3, 1885	present	
Cleveland Street	May 30, 1893	present	
Norwood Avenue	May 30, 1893	present	
Crescent Street	May 30, 1893	present	
Cypress Hills	May 30, 1893	present	
