= Broadway Line (Brooklyn surface) =

The Broadway Line (also known as the East New York Line) was a public transit line in Brooklyn, New York City, United States along Broadway between Williamsburg and East New York. Originally a streetcar line, it later became a bus route, but no bus currently operates over the entire length of Broadway, with the BMT Jamaica Line above.

== History ==
=== Horsecar and streetcar service ===
On August 20, 1858, the Broadway Railroad Company of Brooklyn was chartered. It began running a horse trolley line over Broadway, from South 7th Street at the Grand Street Ferry in Williamsburg to the East New York Depot to connect with the Long Island Rail Road, on March 22, 1859. The line's second track was not yet completed, but was expected to be put into service just after a week later, allowing service to run every six to eight minutes. The railroad's depot was at East New York. Its omnibus cars could carry 16 passengers, and the line was 4.5 miles long. A short single-track branch to Bushwick, outbound on Hooper Street, South Fifth Street, and Montrose Avenue to Bushwick Avenue, and inbound on Johnson Avenue, was built in late 1860. It was planned to be extended further with a double-track line running from Morrell and Johnson Streets to Cypress Hills Cemetery via Johnson Street, Cypress Hills Road, and Cypress Avenue.

An extension from East New York to Cypress Hills was jointly owned with the Brooklyn City and Newtown Railroad and was operated by steam power. A branch of the railroad, the Reid Avenue Line, running from Broadway Ferry to Fulton Street and Reid Avenue opened on October 27, 1873.

The Brooklyn, Queens County and Suburban Railroad was organized on November 24, 1893, and, on January 15, 1894, absorbed the Broadway Railroad Company. Electric streetcars began operating on the route on August 1, 1894. On July 1, 1898, the Brooklyn Rapid Transit Company (BRT) acquired the route.

On December 1, 1923, service over the Williamsburg Bridge ended, with all service ending at Broadway Ferry. Service was extended to Jamaica Avenue via Fulton Street and Crescent Street on October 15, 1928.

In April 1946, service was cut back from Broadway Ferry to Williamsburg Bridge Plaza.

=== Replacement by bus service ===
On January 15, 1950, the streetcar line was discontinued and replaced by an extension of the B22 Atlantic Avenue bus by 1.25 miles (2.01 km) from Van Sinderen Avenue at the Broadway Junction station to Broadway and Gates Avenue, where transfers would be available to the Ralph and Rockaway Avenues Line streetcar that ran along Broadway to Williamsburg Bridge Plaza. Broadway-Jamaica elevated trains provided substitute service along Crescent Street and Fulton Street. After the discontinuation of service, a group of local residents organized a mass meeting protesting the move, and a committee appeared at meetings of the Transit Commission and the Board of Estimate to request replacement bus service. Brooklyn's commissioner on the Board of Transportation agreed with the request, and pushed for the inauguration of bus service. This new bus route, the B27, started on March 12, 1950, running along Fulton Street between Alabama Avenue and Elderts Lane. This route was discontinued on February 1, 1955 due to low ridership.
