= Brooklyn Bridge trolleys =

Former Brooklyn Bridge trolley lines

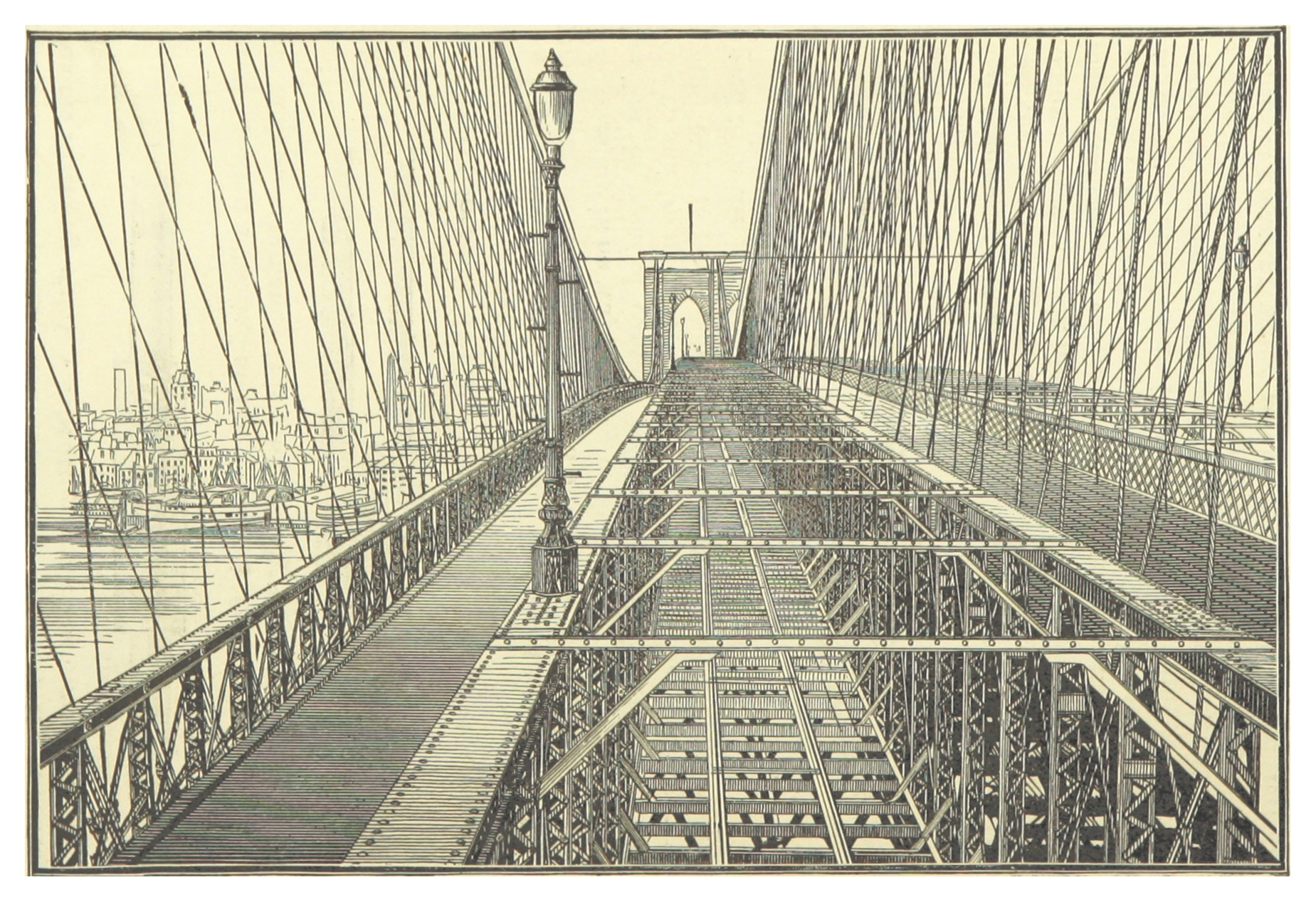
Tracks

From 1898 to 1950, various companies operated local trolley lines over the Brooklyn Bridge, taking passengers from many points in Brooklyn and Queens, New York City, United States to the Park Row terminal in Lower Manhattan. These lines entered the bridge roadway from Fulton Street or Sands Street in Downtown Brooklyn, some of them using elevated trackage at the Sands Street elevated railway station.

== History ==
Thomas A. Edison, Inc.: "New Brooklyn to New York Via Brooklyn Bridge", 1899

Initially, all lines reached the bridge by way of the Brooklyn Heights Railroad's Graham Avenue Line tracks in Sands Street. Cars could enter Sands Street to the west at Fulton Street (many Brooklyn Heights lines) or to the east at Washington Street (Coney Island and Brooklyn Railroad's DeKalb Avenue Line) or Adams Street (Nassau Electric Railroad's Adams Street and Boerum Place Line). From Washington Street, tracks ran east on High Street to the CI&B's Smith Street Line, Concord Street on the Nassau Electric's Park Avenue Line and Vanderbilt Avenue Line, and Myrtle Avenue on the Brooklyn Heights's Myrtle Avenue Line. The first line across the bridge was the Graham Avenue Line, a minor line approaching downtown from the east on Sands Street. This line was chosen because of its half-hour headway, and its cars began crossing the bridge on January 23, 1898.

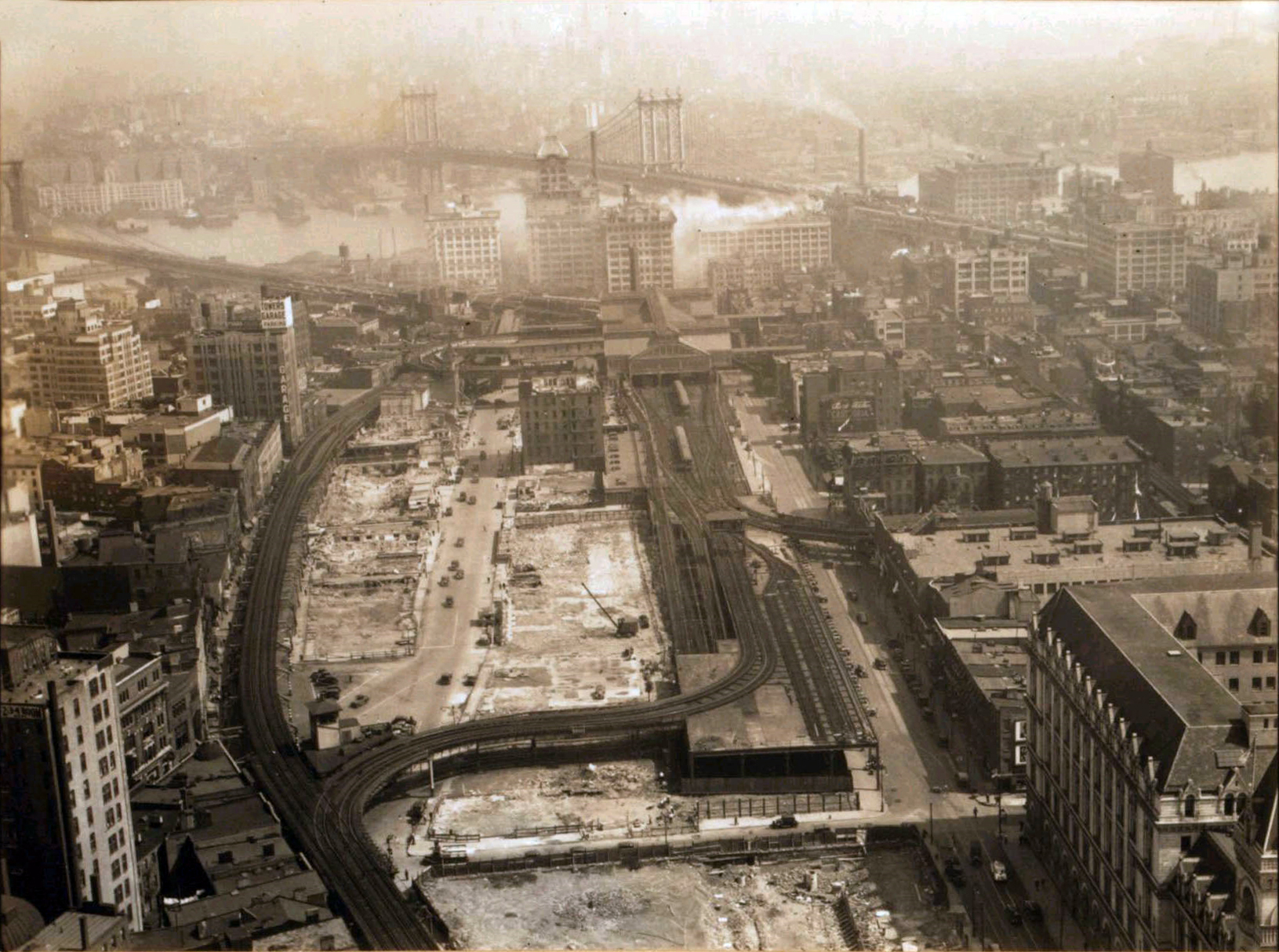
The Brooklyn-bound elevated track can be seen to the left of the elevated railway tracks in this 1936 photo.

A new elevated trolley line on the Brooklyn end of the bridge opened on September 28, 1908, taking trolleys bound for Fulton Street through the Sands Street station of the elevated railways and underneath the connection to the Fulton Street Elevated. This eliminated congestion caused by the crossing of the bridge-bound cars from Fulton Street and the Brooklyn-bound cars to eastbound Sands Street. The Court Street Line, Flatbush Avenue Line, Fulton Street Line, Gates Avenue Line, Myrtle Avenue Line, Putnam Avenue Line, and Union Street Line were moved to this route.

On January 26, 1908, Brooklyn Bridge Local trolley service between the two ends of the bridge was introduced. The cable cars of the New York and Brooklyn Bridge Railway, on whose tracks the Brooklyn Rapid Transit Company was providing through elevated railway service, were discontinued the next day. Local trolley service ended on March 6, 1950 to permit the reconstruction of the bridge's roadway.
