= 12 (BMT rapid transit service) =

Former New York City Subway service (ceased 1950)

12 was the Brooklyn-Manhattan Transit Corporation's designation for trains that used the BMT Lexington Avenue Line. This number was used on service listings on company maps, but was never displayed on train equipment, nor were trains referred to as "12 trains" in the manner of the current system, but were called Lexington Avenue Line trains.

The BMT assigned numbers to its services in 1924, and 12 was applied to trains between Park Row and Eastern Parkway via the Brooklyn Bridge, BMT Myrtle Avenue Line, BMT Lexington Avenue Line and BMT Jamaica Line. During rush hours, service extended east to Crescent Street; some afternoon rush hour trains continued to 111th Street or 168th Street.

Between 1925 and 1931, all rush hour service was extended to 111th or 168th Street. In addition, some afternoon rush hour trains were added between Sands Street (on the Brooklyn side of the Brooklyn Bridge) and 111th Street.

By 1937, normal service had been truncated to the Brooklyn side of the bridge; rush hour trains still crossed the bridge to Park Row. Additionally, trains no longer ran to 168th Street, with all rush hour trains going to 111th Street. The extra afternoon rush hour trains from Sands Street to 111th Street remained.

On May 31, 1940, service was ended on the BMT Fulton Street Line west of Rockaway Avenue and the full length of the BMT Fifth Avenue Line and BMT Third Avenue Line. All Lexington Avenue trains were once again extended across the Brooklyn Bridge to Park Row, and a new service called Fulton – Lexington Avenue was inaugurated, replacing service that had been provided by Fulton Street trains, and operating to the Fulton Street Line terminus at Lefferts Avenue.

On March 5, 1944, the BMT Myrtle Avenue Line was closed west of Jay Street and the Bridge Street station at that location was renamed Bridge–Jay Streets; all 12 trains were truncated there (with a free transfer first to streetcars, and then to the IND at Jay Street – Borough Hall) – see List of New York City Subway transfer stations for details.

By 1948, Fulton – Lexington Avenue trains were truncated to Grant Avenue. The BMT Lexington Avenue Line closed on October 13, 1950, ending all 12 service.
