= BMT Myrtle Avenue Line =

New York City Subway line

- The M train serves the entire remaining section of BMT Myrtle Avenue Line, east of Broadway, at all times. The section west of Broadway has been demolished following its closure.

Overview
- Owner: City of New York
- Locale: Brooklyn and Queens, New York City
- Termini: Metropolitan Avenue; west of Central Avenue
- Stations: 7

Service
- Type: Rapid transit
- System: New York City Subway
- Operator: New York City Transit Authority
- Daily ridership: 29,422

History
- Opened: December 19, 1889; 136 years ago
- Last extension: 1915
- Closed: 1969 (segment west of Central Avenue)

Technical
- Num of tracks: 2
- Character: Street level (Metropolitan Avenue only); Elevated
- Track gauge: 4 ft 8 1/2 in (1,435 mm)
- Electrification: 600V DC third rail

The Myrtle Avenue Line, also called the Myrtle Avenue Elevated, is a fully elevated line of the New York City Subway. The line is the last surviving remnant of one of the original Brooklyn Rapid Transit elevated railroads. The remnant line operates as a spur branch from the Jamaica Line to Bushwick, Ridgewood, and Middle Village, terminating at its original eastern terminal across the street from Lutheran Cemetery. Until 1969, the line continued west into Downtown Brooklyn and, until 1944, over the Brooklyn Bridge to the Park Row Terminal in Manhattan.

== Extent and service ==
The following services use part or all of the BMT Myrtle Avenue Line:

	Time period	Section of line
"M" train	All times	Metropolitan Avenue to west of Central Avenue

The Myrtle Avenue Line is served by the M service. The line begins at Metropolitan Avenue in Middle Village, Queens. It heads southwest along a private right-of-way, eventually joining an elevated structure above Palmetto Street in Ridgewood and Myrtle Avenue in the Brooklyn neighborhood of Bushwick. Just before reaching Broadway (on which the BMT Jamaica Line operates), the line curves to the east and merges into the Jamaica Line tracks just east of the Myrtle Avenue station. The still-existing upper level of the station, which was called "Broadway", opened in 1889 and closed on October 4, 1969.

== History ==
=== Opening ===
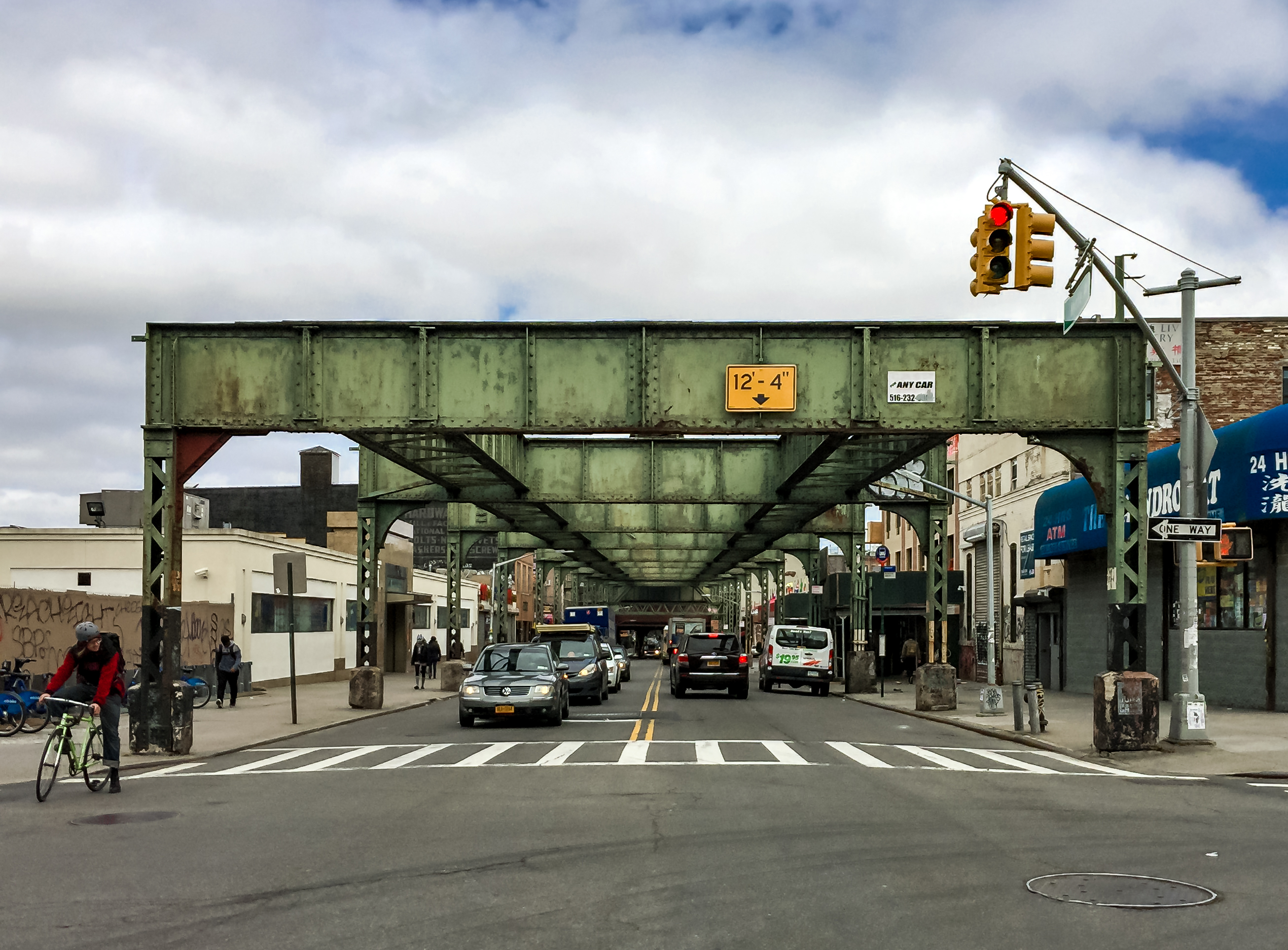
Myrtle Avenue Line stub at Lewis Avenue and Myrtle Avenue, left standing after the line's western portion was demolished in October 1969

The first section of the line ran over Myrtle Avenue from Johnson and Adams Streets to a junction with what was then known as the Main Line at Grand Avenue. It opened on April 10, 1888, by the Union Elevated Railroad Company, which was leased to the Brooklyn Elevated Railroad for its operation. Trains continued along Grand Avenue and Lexington Avenue to Broadway, where the line joined the Broadway Elevated, and then along Broadway to East New York. On September 1, 1888, the line was extended westward along Adams Street and Sands Street, to a terminal at Washington Street for the Brooklyn Bridge. On April 27, 1889, the line was extended east along Myrtle Avenue to Broadway, and to Wyckoff Avenue (at the Brooklyn/Queens border) on July 20, 1889. However, the station at Knickerbocker Avenue did not open until August 15, 1889.

The west end of the line was extended north along Adams Street to an elevated station over Sands Street and High Street in 1896. The connection to the Brooklyn Bridge tracks opened on June 18, 1898, along a private right-of-way halfway between Concord Street and Cathedral Place. The first trains to use it came from the Fifth Avenue Elevated (using the Myrtle Avenue El west of Hudson Avenue).

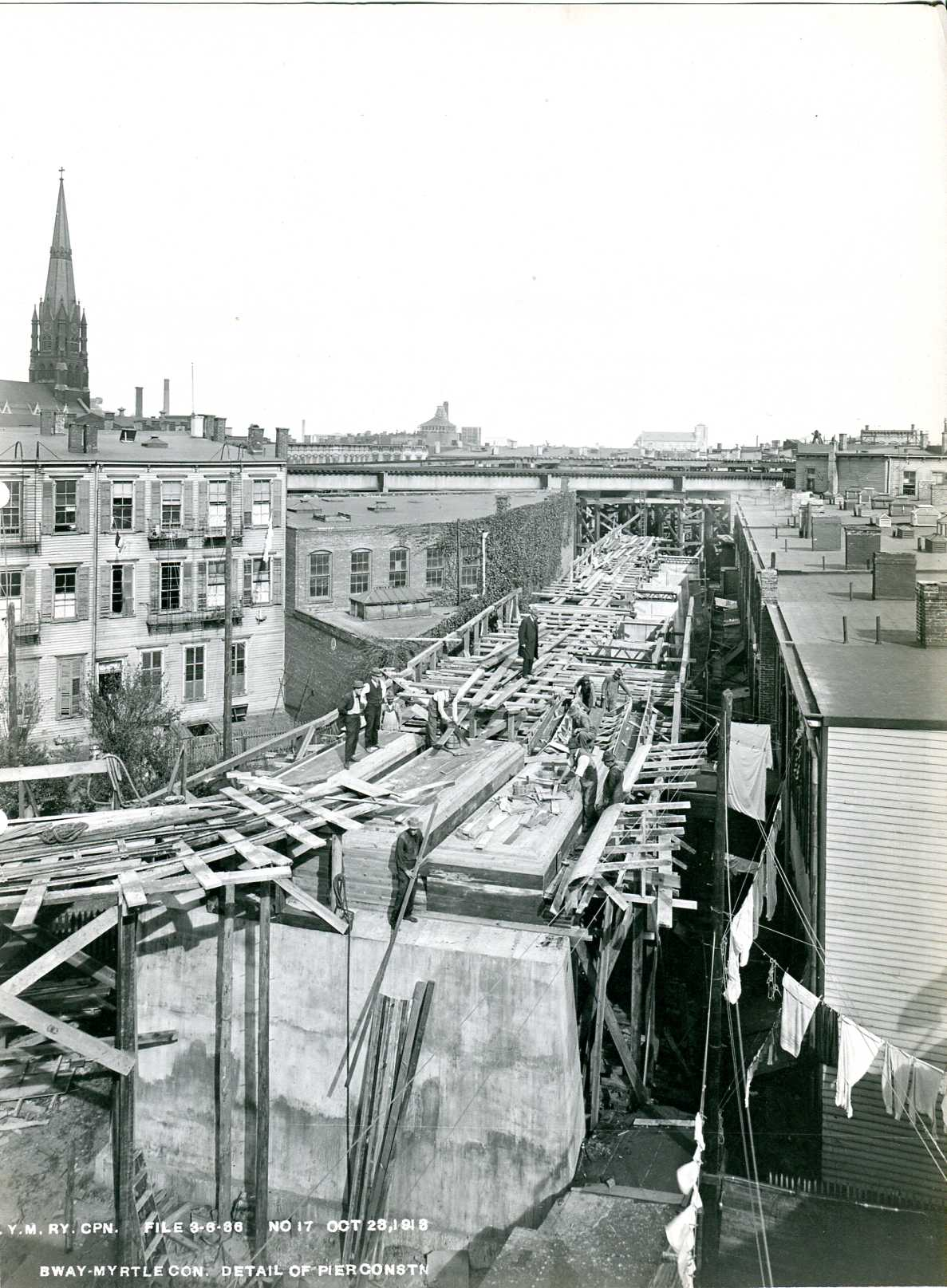
Construction on the Myrtle Viaduct in 1913. The viaduct connects the BMT Myrtle Avenue and Jamaica lines

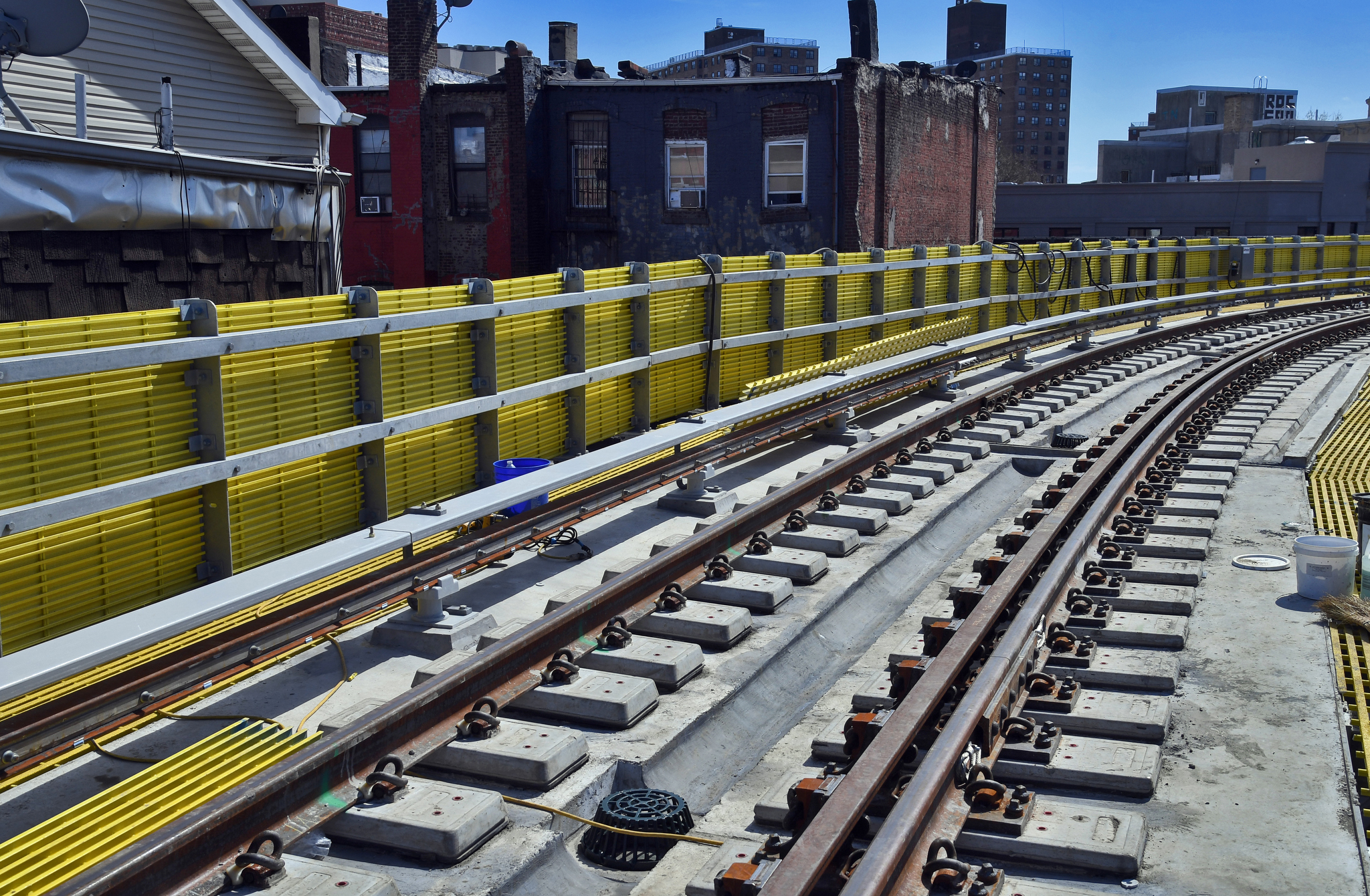
The Myrtle Viaduct 100 years later, after reconstruction

In 1906 the eastern end of the el was connected via a ramp to the Lutheran Cemetery Line, a former steam dummy line to Metropolitan Avenue that had opened on September 3, 1881. On August 1, 1888, the Brooklyn City Railroad took over the Bushwick Railroad Company and on August 3, 1895 they converted the Lutheran Line to electric trolley cars which were less expensive to operate. This section was elevated as part of the Dual Contracts on February 22, 1915.

=== Connection to the Broadway Line ===
On July 29, 1914, the connection to the Broadway-Brooklyn Line was opened, allowing Myrtle Avenue Line trains to operate via the Williamsburg Bridge. Construction on this connection began in August 1913. This service became BMT 10 in 1924, and the original Myrtle Avenue Line service to Park Row became BMT 11, later referred to as M and MJ (although the MJ designation never appeared on any equipment used on the line).

As part of the Dual Contracts rebuilding of the Myrtle Avenue El, a third track was installed north of Myrtle Avenue. This track started from a point south of Central Avenue through Myrtle – Wyckoff Avenues to a bumper just south of Seneca Avenue. The only switches were at the southern end so the center track could only be used for layups (parking). It was never used in revenue service and was removed by 1946.

In Fiscal Year 1930, the platforms at Seneca Avenue were lengthened to accommodate an eight-car train of Standard subway cars.

=== Truncation and later years ===
On March 5, 1944, the line west of Bridge–Jay Streets was closed coincident with the end of elevated service over the Brooklyn Bridge. On January 21, 1953, the Grand Avenue station was closed so that it could be torn down and therefore complete the demolition of the BMT Lexington Avenue Line. The rest of the line from Broadway to Jay Street closed on October 4, 1969, and was demolished soon afterward, ending the MJ service. A free transfer to the B54 bus replaced the MJ, and service was increased on that bus. The free transfer at Jay Street was also replaced with a bus transfer.

In 1986, the New York City Transit Authority launched a study to determine whether to close 79 stations on 11 routes, including the remaining portion of the Myrtle Avenue Line, due to low ridership and high repair costs. Numerous figures, including New York City Council member Carol Greitzer, criticized the plans.

In July 2017, the Metropolitan Transportation Authority started rebuilding two parts of the Myrtle Avenue Line, the 310-foot-long (94 m) approaches to the junction with the BMT Jamaica Line (which lasted until April 2018, requiring suspension of service between Wyckoff and Myrtle Avenues), and the Fresh Pond Bridge over the Montauk Branch in Queens (which lasted from July to September 2017). This work was undertaken in preparation for a reconstruction of the BMT Canarsie Line tunnels under the East River, which took place between 2019 and 2020. Regular service resumed on April 30, 2018. The MTA began removing lead paint from the Myrtle Avenue Line viaduct in 2025.

== Station listing ==
Station service legend
Stops all times	Stops 24 hours a day
Time period details
Disabled access	Station is compliant with the Americans with Disabilities Act
↑	Station is compliant with the Americans with Disabilities Act in the indicated direction only
↓	Station is compliant with the Americans with Disabilities Act in the indicated direction only
	Elevator access to mezzanine only

Neighborhood (approximate)	Disabled access	Station	Services	Opened	Transfers and notes
Queens
Middle Village	Disabled access	Middle Village–Metropolitan Avenue	M	October 1, 1906	Service extended to pre-existing Lutheran Line station, which opened in 1881. Current station is ~100 feet west of the 1906 one.
Ridgewood	connecting track to Fresh Pond Yard				
Ridgewood		Fresh Pond Road	M	February 22, 1915	
Ridgewood		Forest Avenue	M	February 22, 1915	
Ridgewood		Seneca Avenue	M	February 22, 1915	
Brooklyn
Bushwick	Disabled access	Myrtle–Wyckoff Avenues	M	July 20, 1889	BMT Canarsie Line (L ) Station rebuilt to 3 tracks July 29, 1914; center track subsequently removed.
Bushwick		Knickerbocker Avenue	M	August 15, 1889	Station rebuilt to 3 tracks July 29, 1914; center track subsequently removed.
Bushwick		Central Avenue	M	July 20, 1889	Station rebuilt to 3 tracks July 29, 1914; center track subsequently removed.
Bushwick		Evergreen Avenue		July 20, 1889	Closure proposed in 1915 after the New York Municipal Railway company proposed relocating stations on the Myrtle Avenue Elevated between Wyckoff Avenue and Broadway, placing the Central Avenue station's western entrances just 200 feet (61 m) east of Evergreen Avenue. It closed on May 3, 1917.
Bushwick	merges into BMT Jamaica Line just east of Myrtle Avenue (connector added July 29, 1914)				
Closed section
Bedford–Stuyvesant		Broadway		April 27, 1889	Station still in place; tracks removed; closed October 4, 1969
Bedford–Stuyvesant	Structure removed west of Reid Avenue				
Bedford–Stuyvesant		Sumner Avenue		April 27, 1889	Closed October 4, 1969
Bedford–Stuyvesant		Tompkins Avenue		April 27, 1889	Closed October 4, 1969
Bedford–Stuyvesant		Nostrand Avenue		April 27, 1889	Closed October 4, 1969
Bedford–Stuyvesant		Franklin Avenue		April 27, 1889	Closed October 4, 1969
Clinton Hill		Grand Avenue		April 27, 1889	Closed January 21, 1953
Clinton Hill		Washington Avenue		December 4, 1888	Closed October 4, 1969
Clinton Hill		Vanderbilt Avenue		April 10, 1888	Closed October 4, 1969
Fort Greene		Navy Street		April 10, 1888	Closed October 4, 1969
Downtown Brooklyn		Bridge–Jay Streets		April 10, 1888	Earlier known as Bridge Street. Closed October 4, 1969
Downtown Brooklyn		Adams Street		April 10, 1888	Closed March 5, 1944
Downtown Brooklyn		Sands Street		September 1, 1888	Closed March 5, 1944
Brooklyn Bridge
Civic Center		Park Row		June 18, 1898	Closed March 5, 1944
