= Park Row station =

Former BMT elevated station (closed 1944)

Park Row
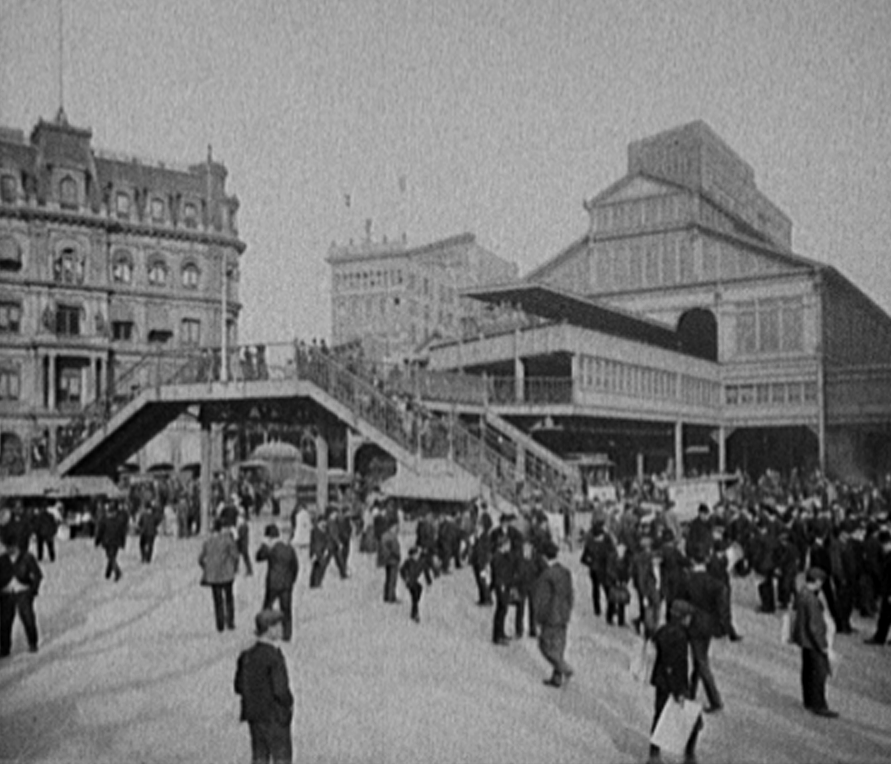
- Park Row station, c. 1905

General information
- Location: Brooklyn Bridge & Centre St; Brooklyn Bridge Promenade; Park Row, New York
- Coordinates: 40°42′44″N 74°0′16″W
- Line: BMT Myrtle Avenue Line
- Platforms: 3 island platforms (2 main terminal, 1 west end); 4 side platforms (2 main terminal, 2 west end); Spanish solution (West End)
- Tracks: 6 (4 main terminal, 2 West End)

Construction
- Structure type: Elevated

History
- Opened: June 18, 1898; 128 years ago
- Closed: March 5, 1944; 82 years ago

Former services in 1939
Preceding station	BMT Lines	Following station
Terminus	12: Lexington Avenue	Sands Street toward Eastern Parkway
Terminus	13: Fulton Street	Sands Street toward Lefferts Avenue
Location

The Park Row station was a major elevated railway terminal constructed on the Manhattan side of the Brooklyn Bridge, across from New York City Hall and the IRT's elevated City Hall station. It served as the terminal for BMT services operating over the Brooklyn Bridge Elevated Line from the BMT Fulton Street Line, BMT Myrtle Avenue Line, and their feeders. Until the opening of the nearby Williamsburg Bridge to elevated train traffic in 1913, it was the only Manhattan station available for elevated trains from Brooklyn and the only elevated station in Manhattan to be owned by a company other than the IRT or its predecessors.

== Early history ==
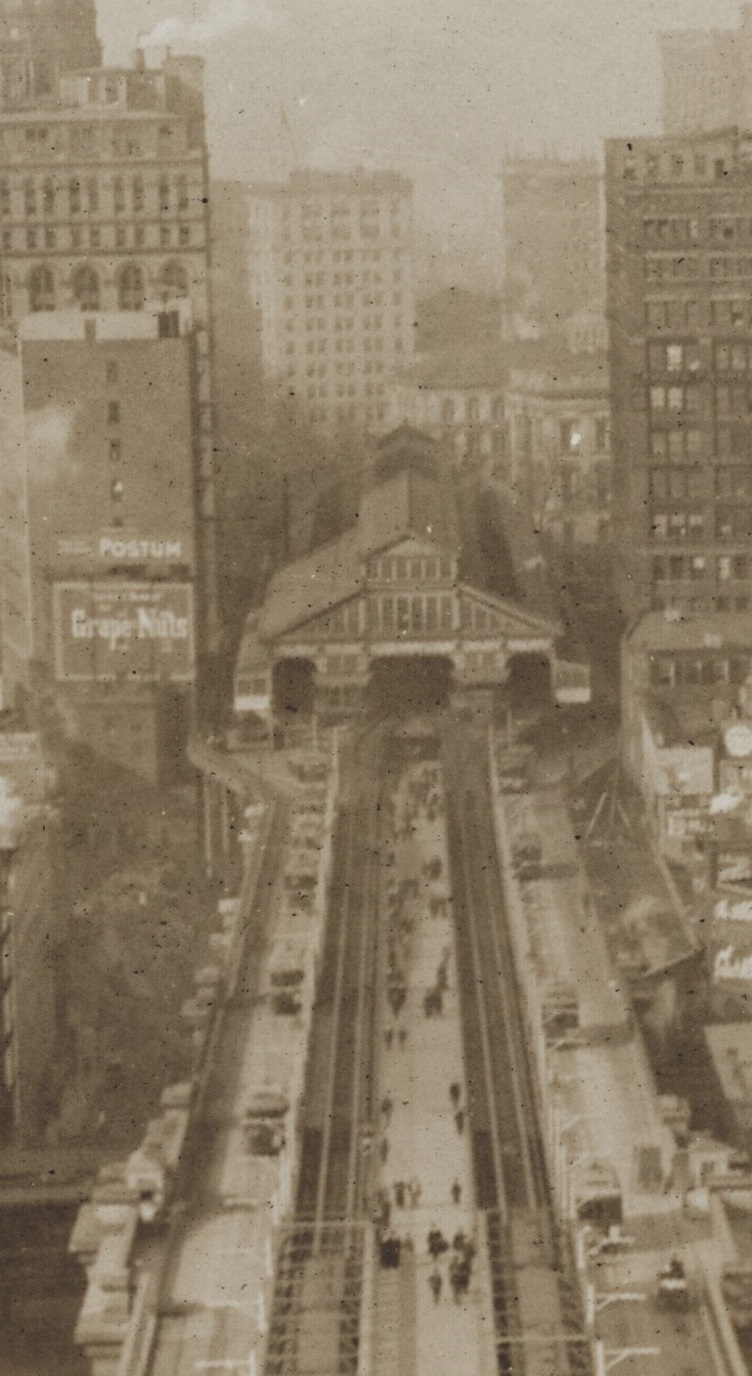
Park Row seen from the top of the Brooklyn Bridge

For the first fifteen years of its existence, it was used exclusively by trains of the New York and Brooklyn Bridge Railway, a cable-hauled line that spanned the length of the bridge between Park Row and another terminal at the Brooklyn end of the bridge.

On June 18, 1898, elevated trains running on the Myrtle Avenue line of the Brooklyn Elevated Railroad, a predecessor the BMT began using the station during off-peak hours, while the cable-hauled shuttle continued to run at rush hours. A similar setup was opened for the Kings County Elevated Railway's Fulton Street line on November 1 that year. Traffic at the station peaked in 1907, during what was known as the "Brooklyn Bridge crush", and additional stairways from the street to the terminal station were built. On January 27, 1908, the shuttle was eliminated and elevated trains began running to Park Row at all times.

At its height, Park Row Terminal had four platforms on four tracks in the main part of the terminal, and another three platforms on two tracks beyond (west of) the main train shed. This resulted in very complex scheduling and track shifting, so that most trains discharged their passengers at dedicated exit platforms and then were transferred to tracks on other platforms for loading of outgoing passengers.

=== Services ===
From 1898 until 1913, the following lines were hosted at least part-time at Park Row:

- From Fulton Street Line (Kings County Elevated Railway)
  - Fulton Street Line
  - Brighton Beach Line via Fulton Street Line from Franklin Avenue.
- From Myrtle Avenue Line (Brooklyn Union Elevated Railway)
  - Myrtle Avenue Line
  - Lexington Avenue Line (Brooklyn) via Myrtle Avenue Line from Grand Avenue
  - Fifth Avenue Line via Myrtle Avenue Line from Navy Street
  - Culver Line via Myrtle Avenue Line and Fifth Avenue Line from 36th Street and 5th Avenue, Brooklyn via 9th Avenue lower level.
  - West End Line via Myrtle Avenue Line and Fifth Avenue Line from 36th Street and 5th Avenue, Brooklyn via 9th Avenue upper level.
  - Third Avenue–Bay Ridge Line via Myrtle Avenue Line and Fifth Avenue Line from 36th Street and 5th Avenue, Brooklyn (cars often attached to end of Culver trains during non-rush hours)
  - Sea Beach Line via Myrtle Avenue Line, Fifth Avenue Line, and West End Line from Bath Junction (cars often attached to end of West End trains during slack times)

== Gradual decline ==
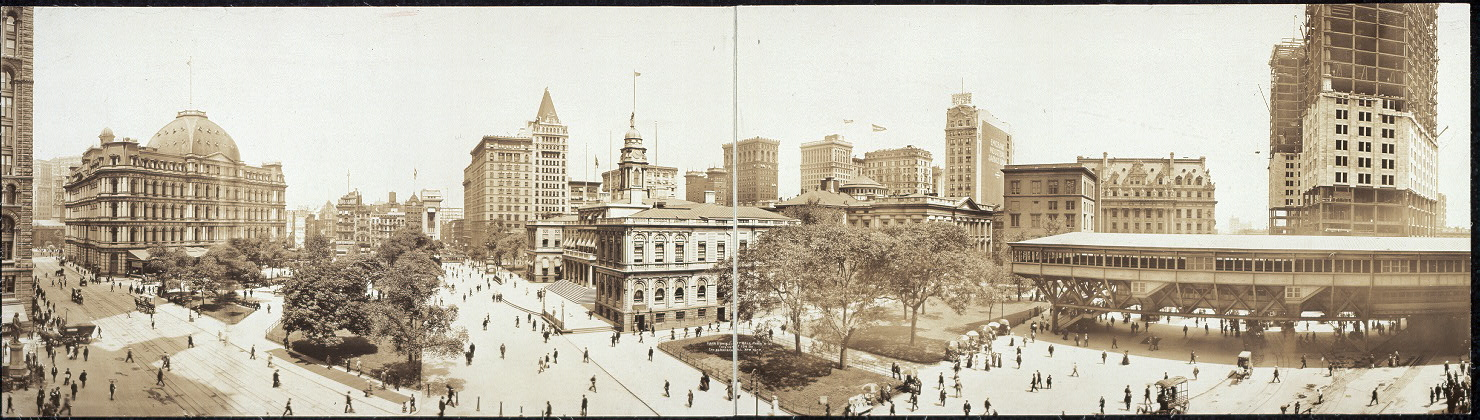
Circa 1911 view of City Hall Park, with the terminal at right

As new bridges and new subways took the pressure off the Brooklyn Bridge services, ridership at Park Row gradually declined. In 1913, BMT built the nearby Chambers Street subway station below the yet to be completed Manhattan Municipal Building, although nine years earlier IRT had built the Brooklyn Bridge subway station at Center Street and Park Row.

October 27, 1913, was the last day of Sea Beach elevated service, in preparation for the new grade-separated line that began to use the BMT Fourth Avenue Line on June 22, 1915. On June 23, 1916, West End trains began using the Fourth Avenue subway exclusively. This was followed by the withdrawal of Brighton Beach service on August 1, 1920, when Brighton Beach trains began using a new connection to the BMT Broadway Line subway, severing its connection with the Fulton Street Line. On May 30, 1931, some Culver trains were rerouted to the Fourth Avenue subway and the BMT Nassau Street Line when the latter line opened.

In 1936, Park Row was reconfigured to two tracks total (the two southern main shed tracks) due to declining use and to simplify operations. On May 31, 1940, in preparation for the New York City takeover of the BMT system, the Fifth Avenue and Bay Ridge lines and services were abandoned, which also ended remaining Culver elevated service via those lines. The main line of the Fulton Street line was abandoned at the same time and, on June 1, a new service, Fulton–Lex, was introduced, bringing trains from the surviving outer portion of the Fulton Street Line to Park Row over the Broadway, Lexington and Myrtle Avenue Lines.

On March 5, 1944, all remaining elevated lines stopped using Park Row, and the Myrtle Avenue, Lexington Avenue, and Fulton–Lex services were cut back to the Bridge Street station in downtown Brooklyn. Brooklyn Bridge streetcars were shifted to the elevated tracks and used them until 1950, when all public transit was removed from the bridge. The streetcars did not use the Park Row terminal, but continued to use the trolley loops beneath the train shed, which was torn down.
