= Lorimer Street station (BMT Jamaica Line) =

New York City Subway station in Brooklyn

Lorimer Street
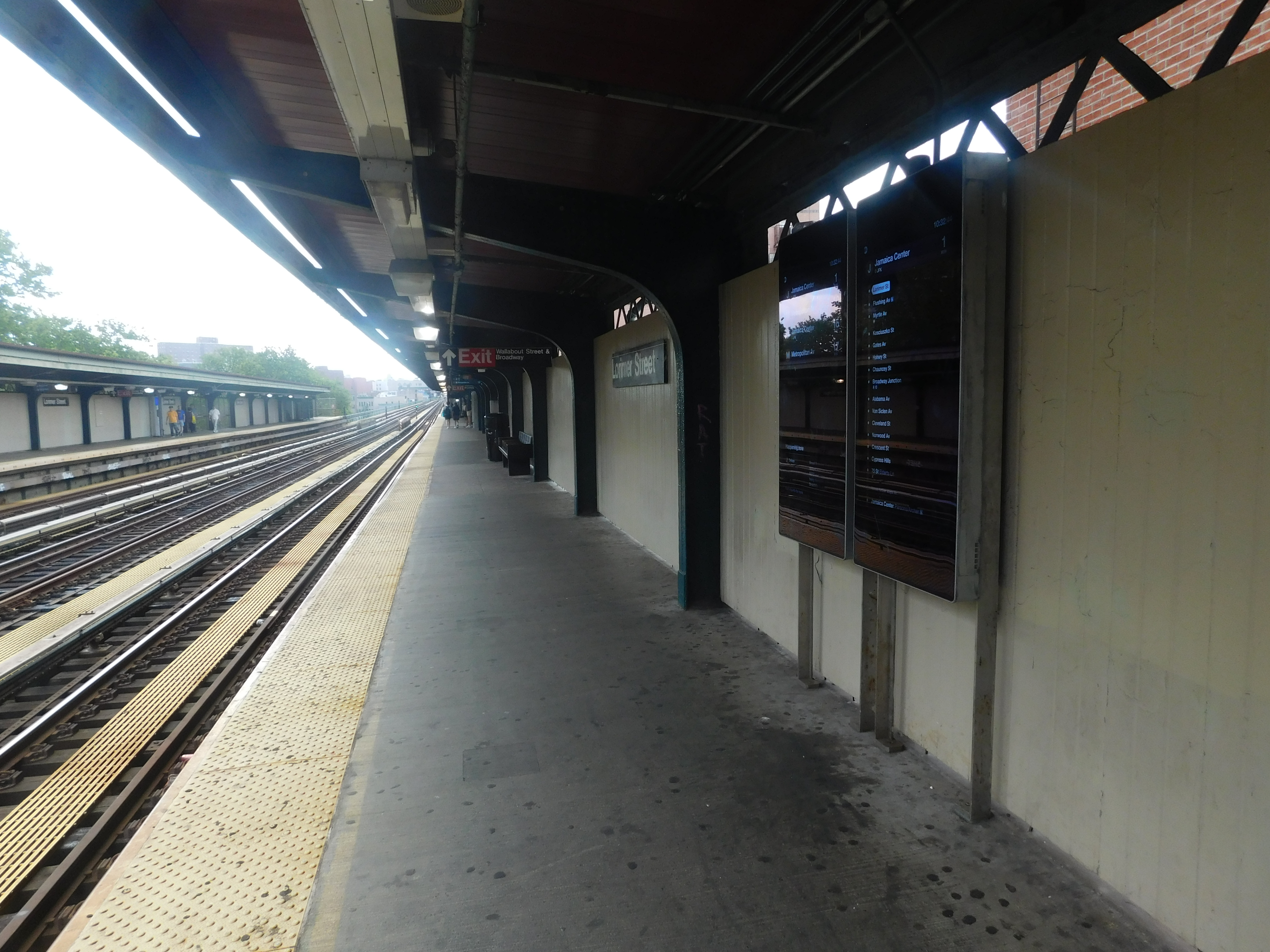
- A view of the northbound platform

Station statistics
- Address: Lorimer Street and Broadway; Brooklyn, New York
- Borough: Brooklyn
- Locale: Williamsburg
- Coordinates: 40.704099°N 73.947902°W
- Division: B (BMT)
- Line: BMT Jamaica Line
- Services: J (all times except weekdays 7:00 a.m. to 8:00 p.m., peak direction); M (all times except late nights)
- Transit: NYCT Bus: B46, B48
- Structure: Elevated
- Platforms: 2 side platforms
- Tracks: 3

Other information
- Opened: June 25, 1888; 138 years ago

Traffic
- 2025: 1,040,471 ▲15.5%
- Rank: 303 out of 423
Services
Preceding station	New York City Subway	Following station
Hewes Street J M via Essex Street	Local	Flushing Avenue J M via Myrtle Avenue
does not stop here
Location
Location within New York City Subway
Location within New York City
Location within New York
Track layout
Street map
Station service legend
Symbol	Description
Stops all times except weekdays in the peak direction	Stops all times except weekdays in the peak direction
Stops all times except late nights	Stops all times except late nights

The Lorimer Street station is a local station on the BMT Jamaica Line of the New York City Subway. Located at the intersection of Lorimer Street and Broadway in Brooklyn, it is served by the J train at all times except weekdays in the peak direction and the M train at all times except late nights. The Z train skips this station when it operates.

== History ==
This station opened on June 25, 1888, when the Union Elevated Railroad (leased to the Brooklyn Elevated Railroad) extended its elevated line above Broadway from Gates Avenue northwest to Driggs Avenue in Williamsburg. This was a branch of the existing Lexington Avenue Elevated, which then ended at Van Siclen Avenue; Broadway trains ran between Driggs and Van Siclen Avenues. The Broadway Elevated was extended to Broadway Ferry on July 14, 1888. Upon the opening of the Williamsburg Bridge tracks in 1908, trains were rerouted across the bridge west of Marcy Avenue.

== Station layout ==
There are two side platforms and three tracks. The center track is used by the J and Z trains in the peak direction weekday midday and rush hours. Both platforms have beige windscreens and red canopies with green frames and support columns. Some sections of the windscreen feature mesh to allow a view of the streets below. The station name plates are in the standard black with white lettering.

The 2002 artwork here is called Roundlet Series by Annette Davidek. It features 16 stained glass panels on the platform windscreens that are 36 inches tall and 36 inches wide. They all have a floral and vine theme.

=== Exits ===
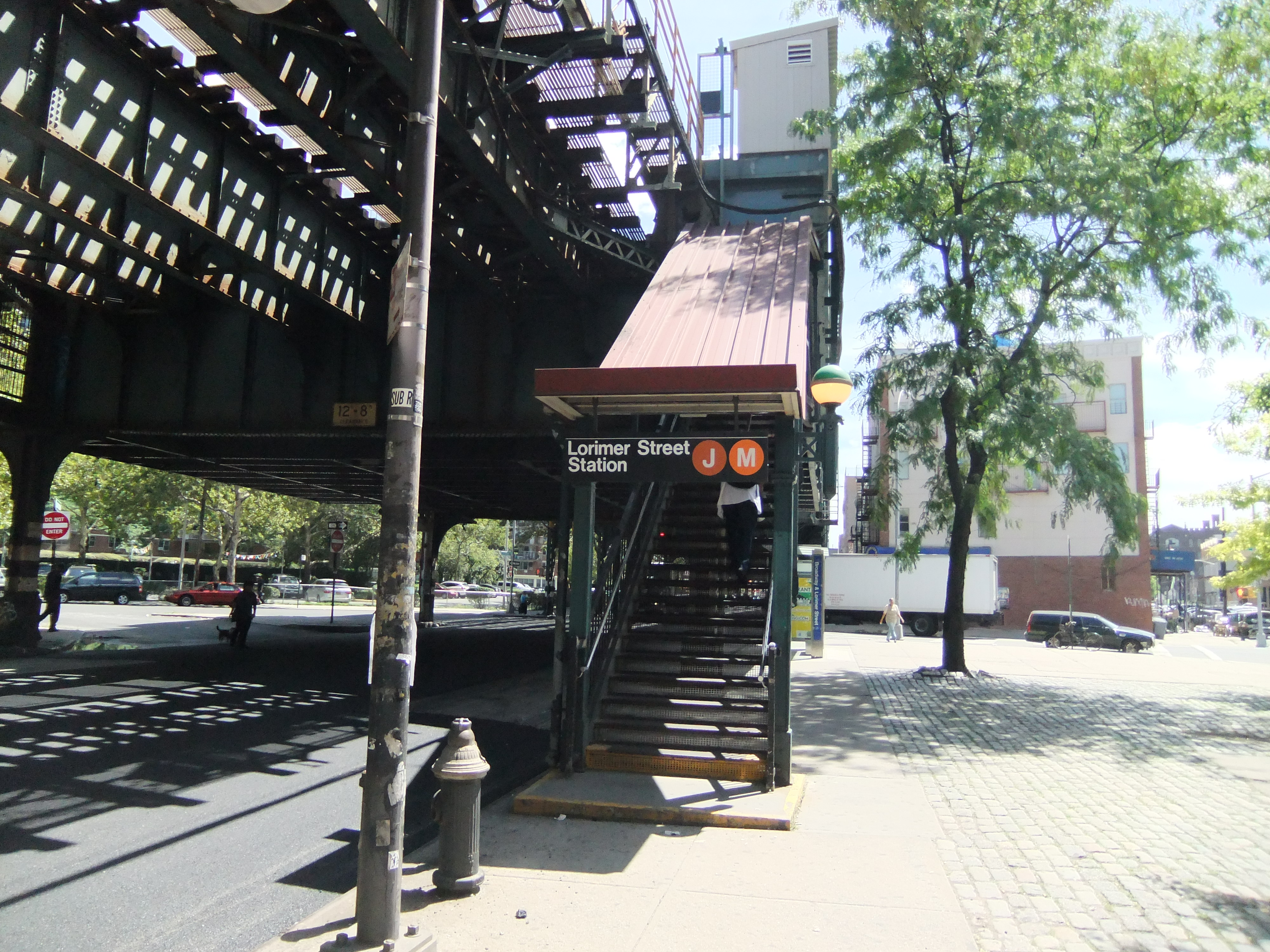
Southwestern stair

This station has two entrances/exits. The full-time side is an elevated station house beneath the tracks on the northwest end. Inside fare control, it has one staircase to each platform at their extreme ends and a waiting area that allows a free transfer between directions. Outside fare control, there is a turnstile bank, token booth, and two staircases to the street. One goes down to the northwest corner of Broadway and Lorimer Street while the other goes down to the southeast peninsula formed by Throop Avenue, Lorimer Street, and Broadway. The northbound platform has an additional staircase going up to a work level above the mezzanine.

The station's other entrance/exit is unstaffed and has a sealed elevated station house beneath the tracks. A single staircase from each platform goes down to the station house landing, where a single high entry/exit turnstile provides entrance/exit from the system. Another staircase then goes down to either western corner of Wallabout Street and Broadway.

Broadway on the IND Crosstown Line is about two blocks to the west from the full-time entrance at Lorimer Street. Despite demands from G riders, there is no permanent free transfer from Lorimer Street to there; a free transfer was temporarily created in Summer 2014 due to the Hurricane Sandy-related shutdown of the IND Crosstown Line under the Newtown Creek. A free transfer using a MetroCard between Broadway and Lorimer Street stations was provided during the 14th Street Tunnel shutdown from April 2019 until May 31, 2020 during weekends and late nights. The transfer was honored through the end of May 2020, even though L train tunnel work was completed on April 26.
