= Hewes Street station =

New York City Subway station in Brooklyn

Hewes Street
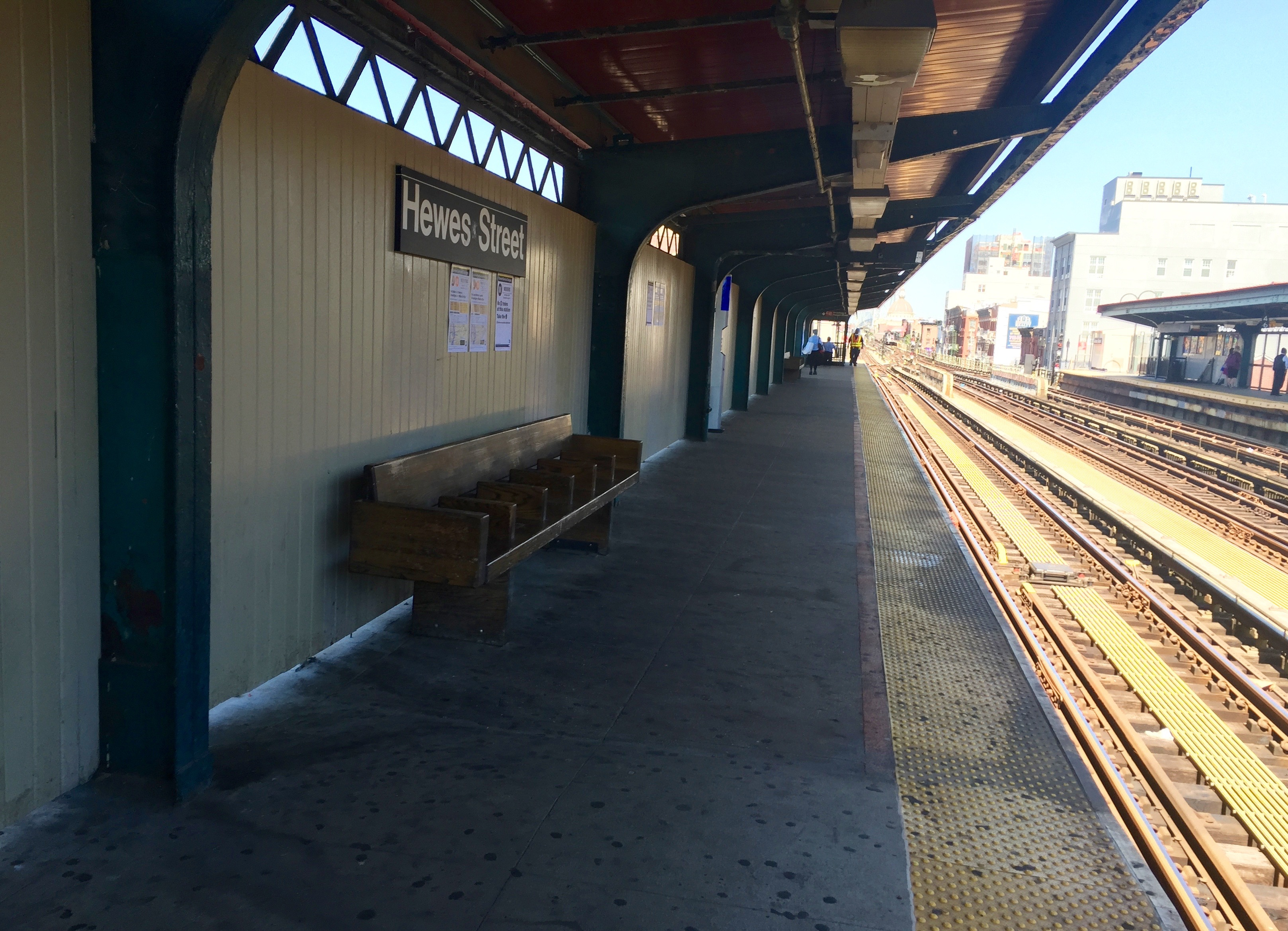
- Northbound platform

Station statistics
- Address: Hewes Street & Broadway; Brooklyn, New York
- Borough: Brooklyn
- Locale: Williamsburg
- Coordinates: 40.706669°N 73.953009°W
- Division: B (BMT)
- Line: BMT Jamaica Line
- Services: J (all times except weekdays 7:00 a.m. to 8:00 p.m., peak direction); M (all times except late nights)
- Transit: NYCT Bus: B46
- Structure: Elevated
- Platforms: 2 side platforms
- Tracks: 3

Other information
- Opened: June 25, 1888; 138 years ago

Traffic
- 2025: 676,977 ▲0.9%
- Rank: 357 out of 423
Services
Preceding station	New York City Subway	Following station
Marcy Avenue J M via Essex Street	Local	Lorimer Street J M via Myrtle Avenue
does not stop here
Location
Location within New York City Subway
Location within New York City
Location within New York
Track layout
Street map
Station service legend
Symbol	Description
Stops all times except weekdays in the peak direction	Stops all times except weekdays in the peak direction
Stops all times except late nights	Stops all times except late nights

The Hewes Street station is a local station on the BMT Jamaica Line of the New York City Subway. Located at the intersection of Hewes Street and Broadway in Brooklyn, it is served by the J train at all times except weekdays in the peak direction and the M train at all times except late nights. The Z train skips this station when it operates.

== History ==
This station opened on June 25, 1888, when the Union Elevated Railroad (leased to the Brooklyn Elevated Railroad) extended its elevated line above Broadway from Gates Avenue northwest to Driggs Avenue in Williamsburg. This was a branch of the existing Lexington Avenue Elevated, which then ended at Van Siclen Avenue; Broadway trains ran between Driggs and Van Siclen Avenues. The Broadway Elevated was extended to Broadway Ferry on July 14, 1888. Upon the opening of the Williamsburg Bridge tracks in 1908, trains were rerouted across the bridge west of Marcy Avenue.

== Station layout ==
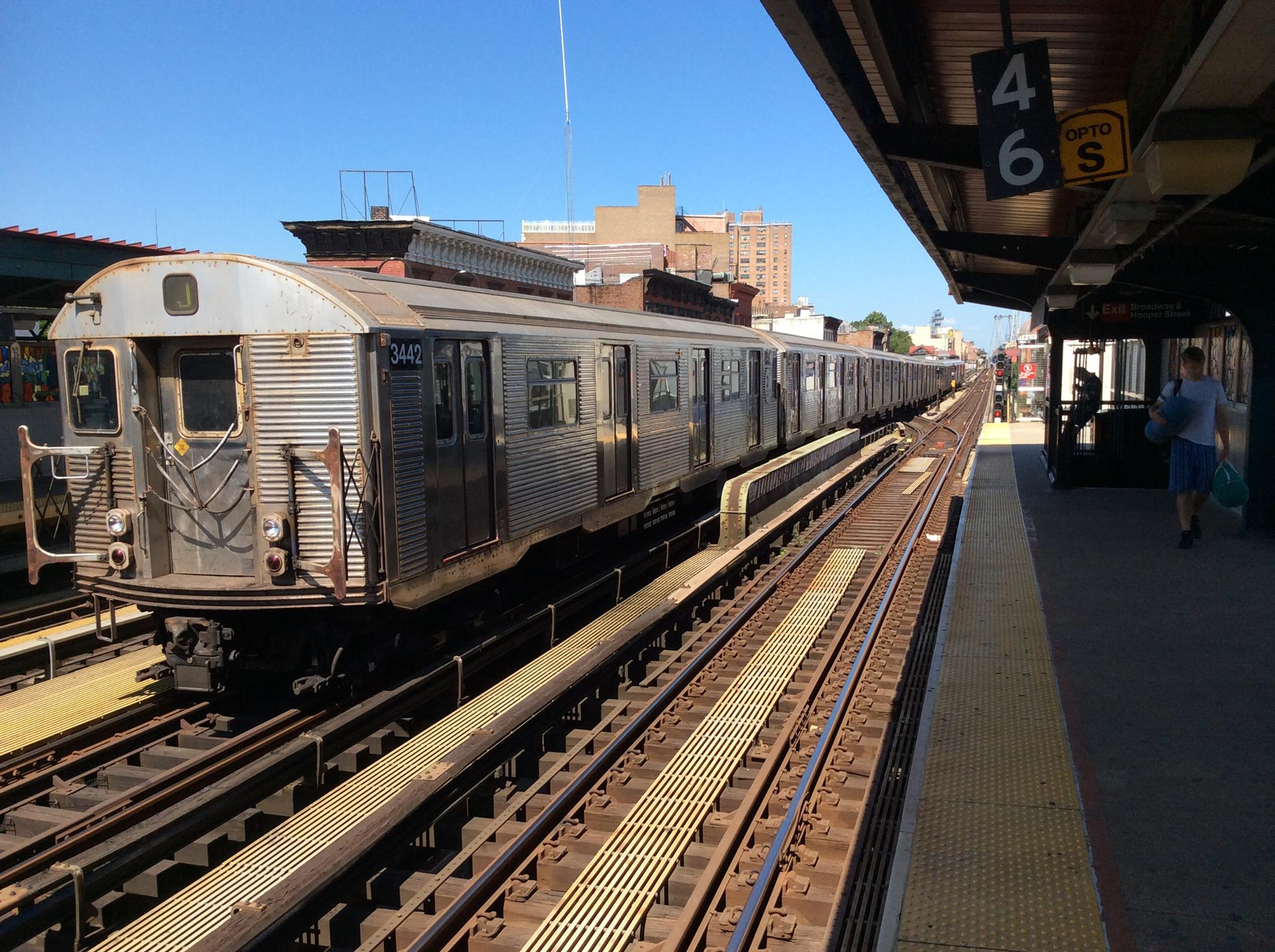
Manhattan-bound R32 J train bypassing the station

This elevated station, built four stories above street level, has two side platforms and three tracks. The center track is used by the J and Z trains in the peak direction weekday midday and rush hours. Each platform has beige windscreens, green canopies, and red roofs that run from end to end.

The artwork here is called El in 16 Notes by Mara Held. It features sixteen panels of art glass, each containing random geometric shapes and is based on shapes found in dress patterns.

=== Exits ===
The station has exits on both the west (railroad north) end and the east (railroad south) end of its platforms.

On the west end, each platform has a single staircase leading to an elevated station house beneath the tracks. It has a turnstile bank and token booth. Outside of fare control, two staircases lead to the western corners of Broadway and Hooper Street. Each staircase landing has an exit-only turnstile to allow passengers to exit without having to go through the station house.

On the east end, each platform has a single staircase leading to a turnstile bank. Outside of fare control, a single staircase from each side leads to the eastern corners of Broadway and Hewes Street. The station house has been removed. These exits were closed in the 1980s due to high crime and served as emergency exits until 2018. They were reopened on November 16, 2018 to accommodate L train riders who would be displaced during the 14th Street Tunnel shutdown in 2019–2020. As part of the tunnel shutdown plans, these exits would also contain a temporary MetroCard transfer to the nearby Broadway station on the G train, during weekends and late nights. The transfer was honored through the end of May 2020, even though L train tunnel work was completed on April 26.

== Gallery ==
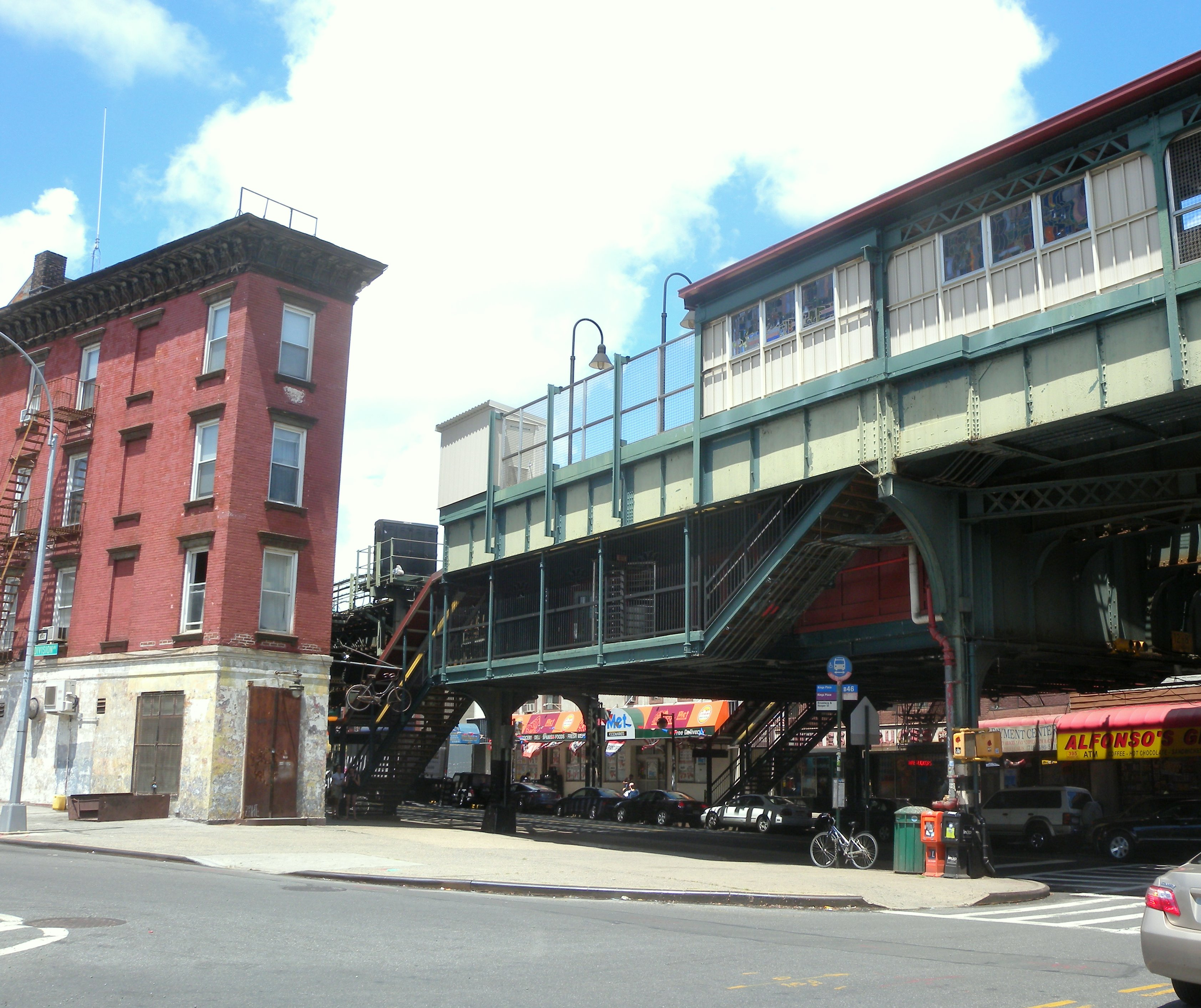
Hooper Street stationhouse

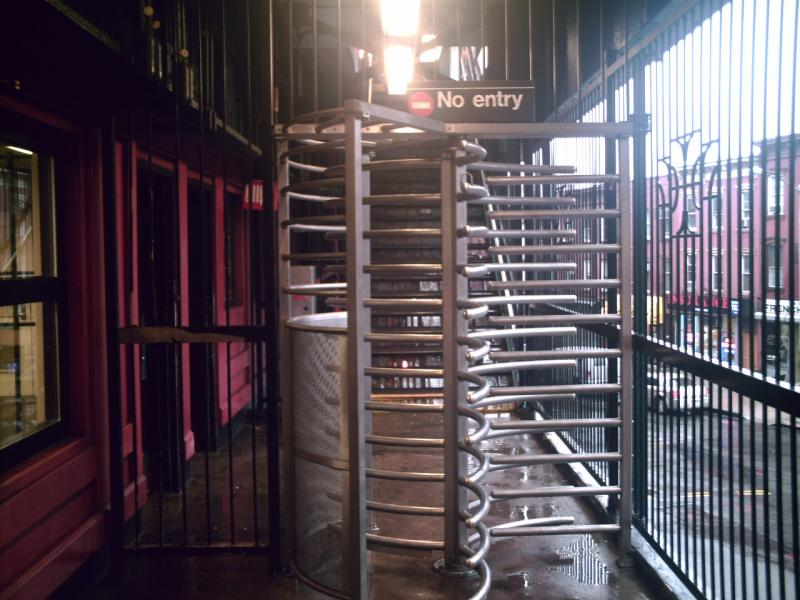
Exit-Only Turnstile

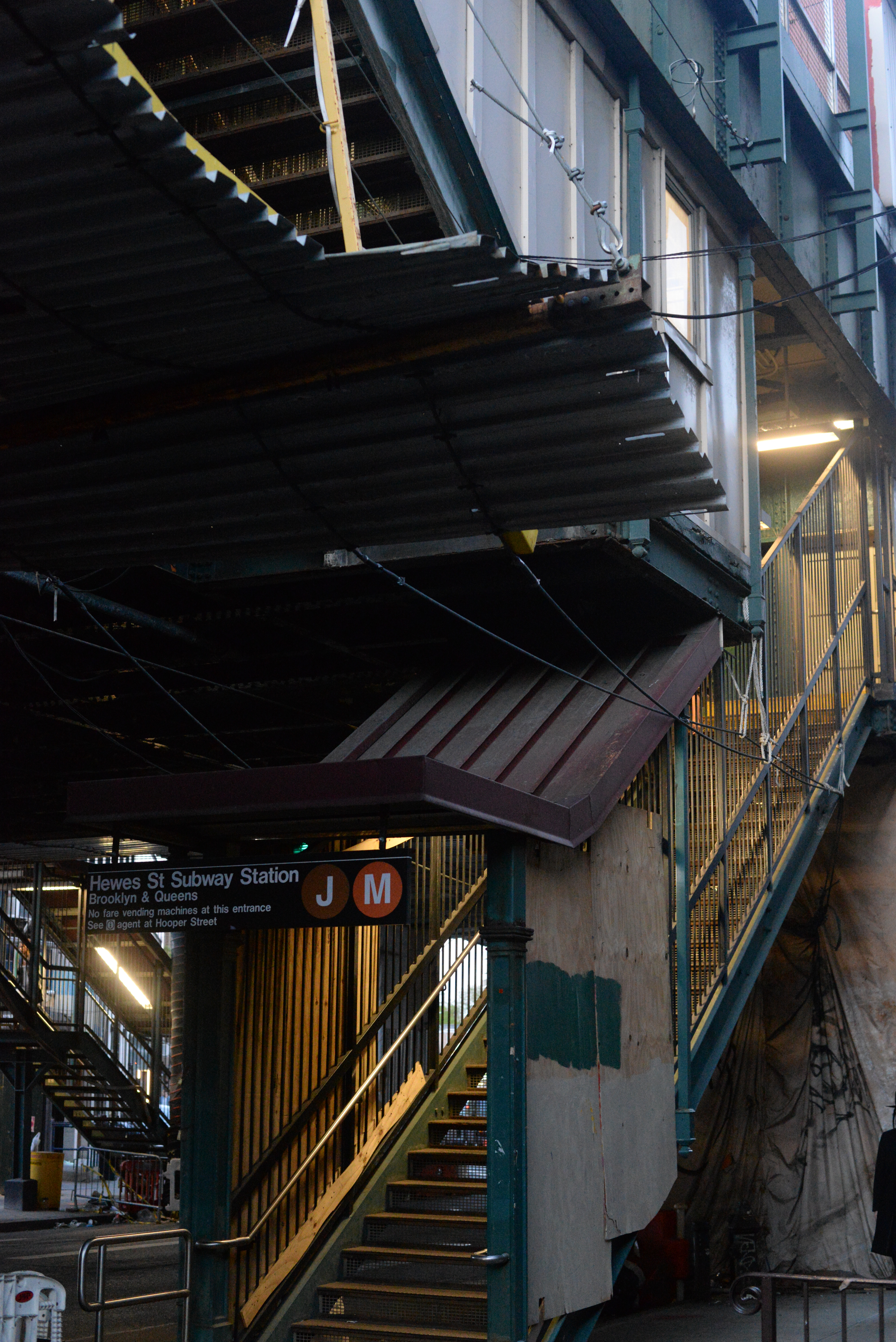
Entrance at Hooper St

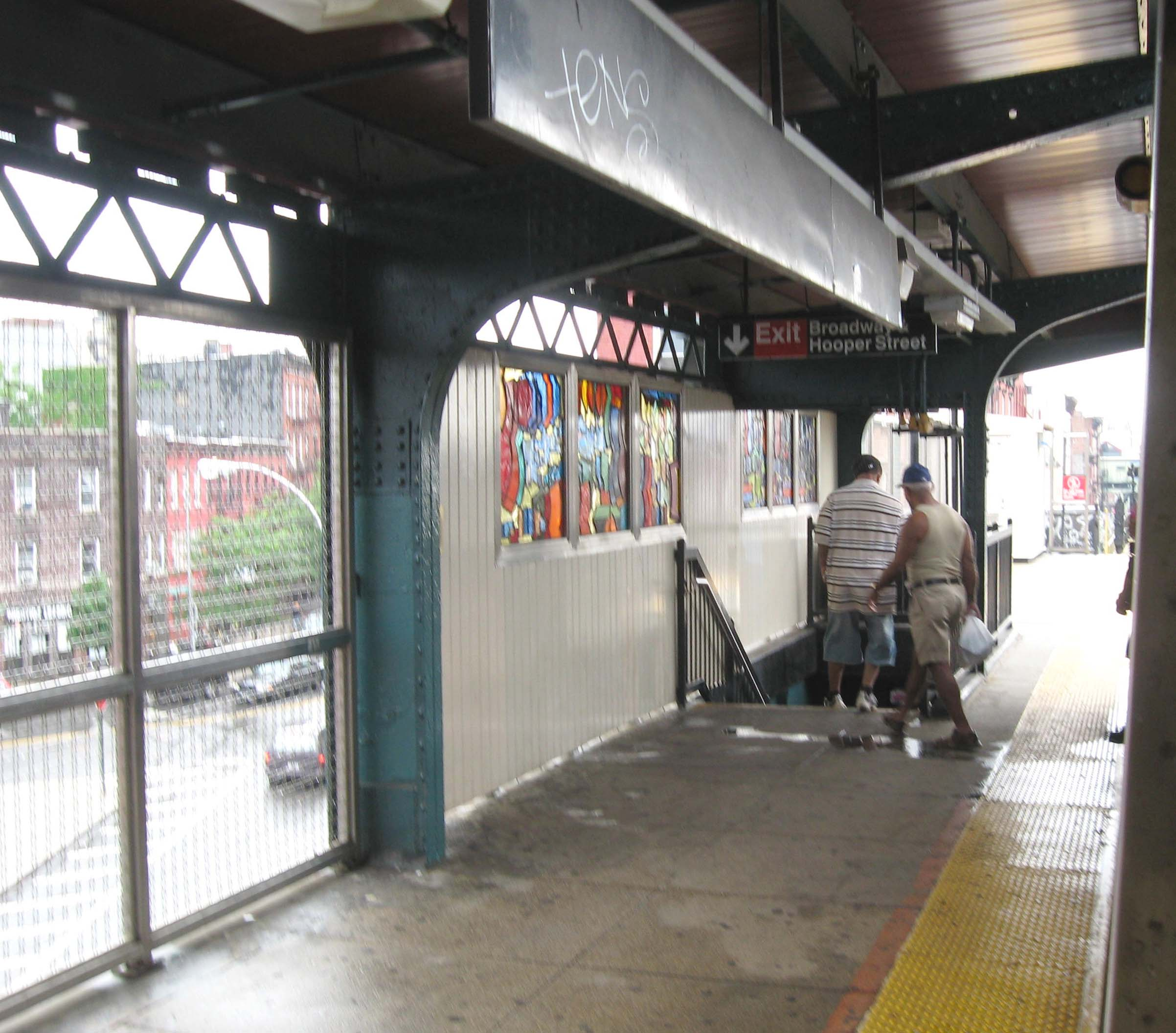
Platform stairs
