= Flushing Avenue station (BMT Jamaica Line) =

New York City Subway station in Brooklyn

Flushing Avenue
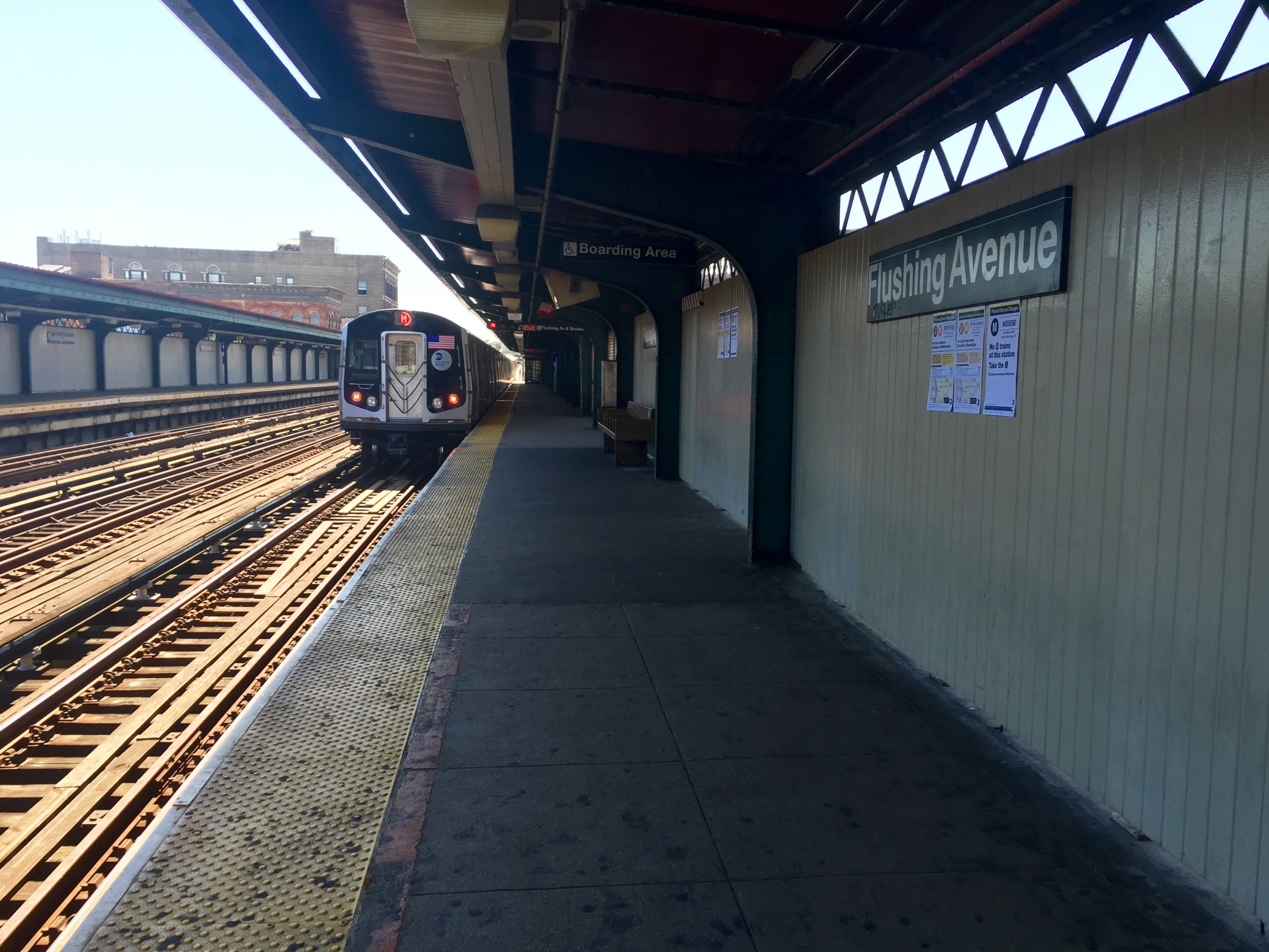
- R160 M train leaving the southbound platform

Station statistics
- Address: Flushing Avenue and Broadway; Brooklyn, New York
- Borough: Brooklyn
- Locale: Williamsburg, Bedford–Stuyvesant, Bushwick
- Coordinates: 40.700683°N 73.941979°W
- Division: B (BMT)
- Line: BMT Jamaica Line
- Services: J (all times except weekdays 7:00 a.m. to 8:00 p.m., peak direction); M (all times except late nights)
- Transit: NYCT Bus: B15, B43, B46, B47, B57
- Structure: Elevated
- Platforms: 2 side platforms
- Tracks: 3

Other information
- Opened: June 25, 1888; 138 years ago
- Accessible: Yes

Traffic
- 2025: 1,990,994 ▲20.6%
- Rank: 180 out of 423
Services
Preceding station	New York City Subway	Following station
Lorimer Street J M via Essex Street	Local	Myrtle Avenue J M services split
does not stop here
Non-revenue services and lines
Preceding station	New York City Subway	Following station
	no service	Park Avenue demolished
Location
Location within New York City Subway
Location within New York City
Location within New York
Track layout
Street map
Station service legend
Symbol	Description
Stops all times except late nights	Stops all times except late nights
Stops all times except weekdays in the peak direction	Stops all times except weekdays in the peak direction

The Flushing Avenue station is a local station on the BMT Jamaica Line of the New York City Subway. Located at the intersection of Flushing Avenue and Broadway in Bedford–Stuyvesant, Brooklyn, it is served by the J train at all times except weekdays in the peak direction and the M train at all times except late nights. The Z train skips this station when it operates.

== History ==
This station opened on June 25, 1888, when the Union Elevated Railroad (leased to the Brooklyn Elevated Railroad) extended its elevated line above Broadway from Gates Avenue northwest to Driggs Avenue in Williamsburg. This was a branch of the existing Lexington Avenue Elevated, which then ended at Van Siclen Avenue; Broadway trains ran between Driggs and Van Siclen Avenues. The Broadway Elevated was extended to Broadway Ferry on July 14, 1888. Upon the opening of the Williamsburg Bridge tracks in 1908, trains were rerouted across the bridge west of Marcy Avenue.

The MTA announced in December 2021 that it would install wide-aisle fare gates for disabled passengers at five subway stations, including Flushing Avenue, by mid-2022. The implementation of these fare gates was delayed; none of the wide-aisle fare gates had been installed by early 2023. Also, in December 2021, the MTA awarded a contract for the replacement of the Flushing Avenue station's elevators, to be completed by late 2023 or early 2024. In early 2024, to discourage fare evasion, the MTA reconfigured emergency exits at the station so the exits opened only after a 15-second delay.

== Station layout ==
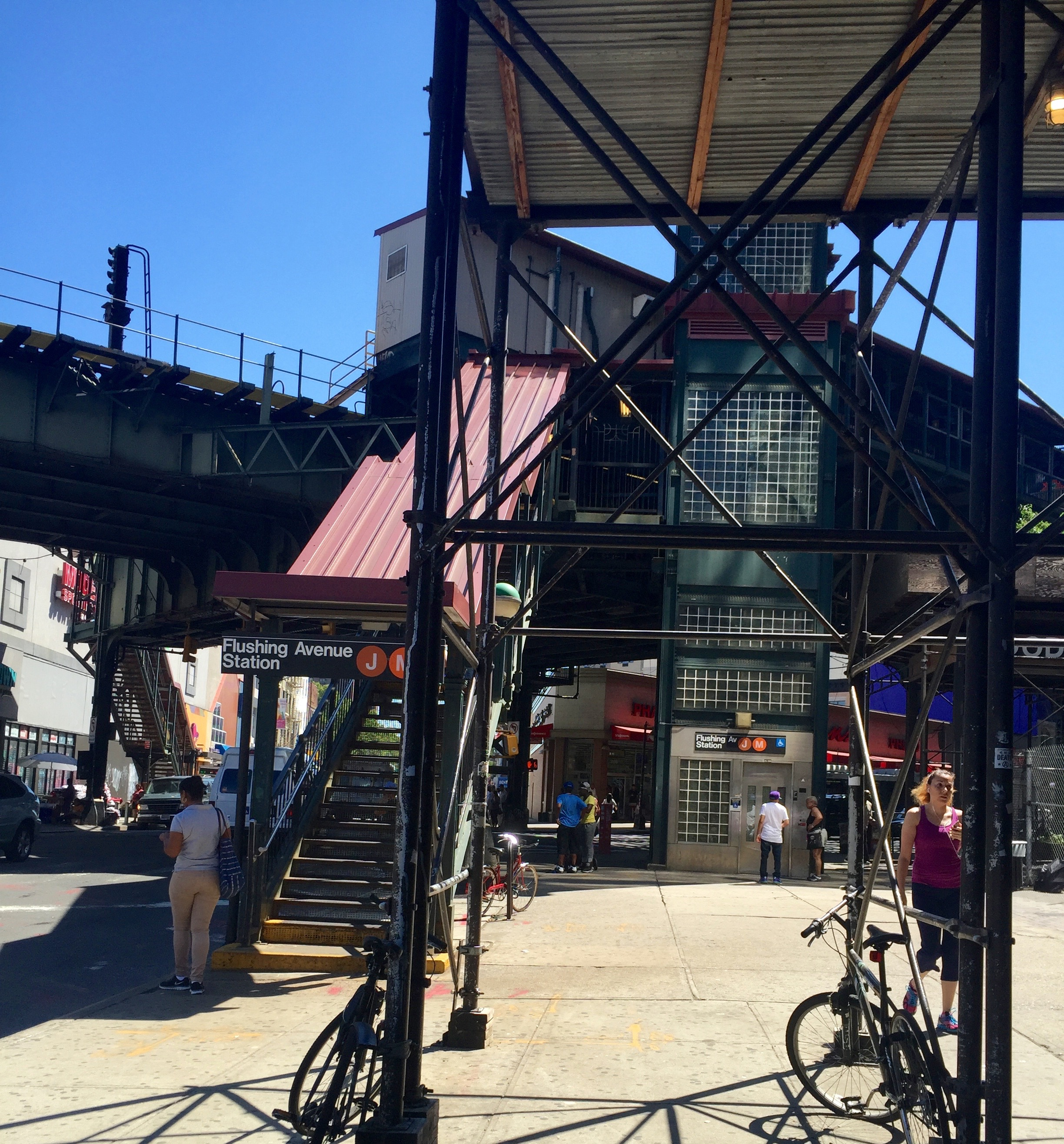
Elevator and stairs from street

This elevated station has two side platforms and three tracks. The center track is used by the J and Z trains in the peak direction weekday midday and rush hours. Both platforms have beige windscreens with red canopies supported by green frames and support columns along the entire length. The station signs are in the standard black plate with white lettering.

The 2006 artwork here is called Migration by Robin Holder. It features stained glass windows on the platform windscreens and station house.

=== Exits ===
There are two sets of entrance/exits at the station. One is located at an elevated station house beneath the tracks, which has two staircases from either southern corners of Flushing Avenue and Broadway, token booth, turnstile bank, a waiting area that allows a free transfer between directions, and a single staircase to each platform at their extreme north end. Each staircase landing has an exit-only turnstile to allow passengers to exit the station without having to go through the station house. Three elevators were installed in Fall 2003 to make this station ADA accessible due to its proximity to Woodhull Hospital. One of them is at the southwest corner of Broadway and Flushing Avenue and goes up to the adjacent staircase balcony. The other two go up to the platforms from the staircase landing.

The other set of entrance/exit are stairs located at the south ends of each platform. These stairs lead to Fayette Street. There was formerly another station house at this end, but it was removed. These stairs were closed in the 1980s due to high crime, but were reopened in July 2017 to address potential capacity constraints from shuttle bus transfers due to reconstruction on the Myrtle Avenue Line and the 14th Street Tunnel.
