= List of closed New York City Subway stations =

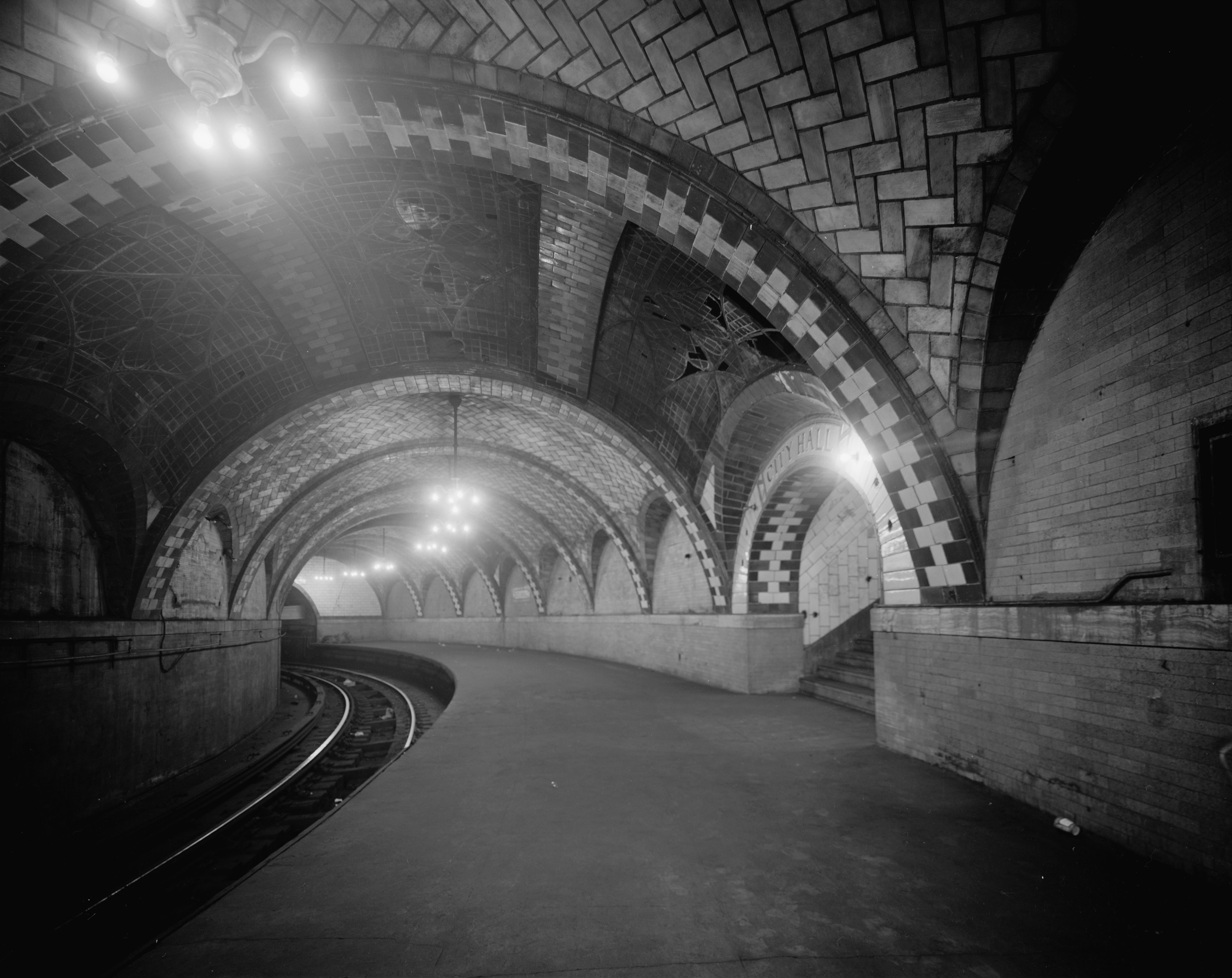
The City Hall station was the original southern terminal station of the first line.

The New York City Subway is a rapid transit system that serves four of the five boroughs of New York City in the U.S. state of New York: the Bronx, Brooklyn, Manhattan, and Queens. Its predecessors—the Interborough Rapid Transit Company (IRT), the Brooklyn–Manhattan Transit Corporation (BMT), and the Independent Subway System (IND)—were consolidated in 1940. Since then, many New York City Subway stations have been permanently closed, either entirely (9 of them) or in part (24 of them).

The largest number of closed New York City Subway stations consist of stations on abandoned and demolished elevated lines that were once operated by the IRT and the BMT, both of which were privately held companies. After their takeover by the City of New York (the IND was already owned and operated by New York City), the three former systems were no longer in competition with each other. Thus, elevated lines that duplicated underground lines were the first to close. Other elevated lines that did not create a redundancy in the system, such as the Bronx portion of the IRT Third Avenue Line and a major portion of the BMT Myrtle Avenue Line were later demolished. Two stations in which sections of track still operate have been demolished. The Dean Street station was demolished as part of the rebuilding of the BMT Franklin Avenue Line, and the Cortlandt Street station of the IRT Broadway–Seventh Avenue Line was demolished and subsequently rebuilt after it sustained heavy damage caused by the September 11 attacks. A number of stations were temporarily closed in Lower Manhattan in the aftermath of the attacks, see Closings and cancellations following the September 11 attacks.

The remaining closed stations and portions of stations are intact and are abandoned. The exception is the Court Street station: it is the site of the New York Transit Museum, a museum that documents the history of public transportation in New York City. The closed outer platforms of the Hoyt–Schermerhorn Streets station are occasionally used for filming purposes. The criterion for closing stations, as explained by NYC spokesman Charles Seaton, is not "because of low ridership. The only reason we have closed a station is because of its proximity to another station... The smaller stations are just as necessary as the larger ones."

== Permanently closed but existing stations ==
These stations are still intact but are not currently served by passenger trains. This list does not include closed platforms on a different level of an open station.

| Station | Division | Line | Borough | Opened | Closed | Former services | Notes |
|---|---|---|---|---|---|---|---|
| 18th Street | A (IRT) | Lexington Avenue Line | Manhattan | October 27, 1904 | November 8, 1948 | "6" train | Between 23rd Street–Baruch College and 14th Street–Union Square. Closed after platform lengthening of both adjacent stations and the opening of new entrances at 22nd Street and 15th Street deemed the 18th Street station to be within proximity. |
| 91st Street | A (IRT) | Broadway–Seventh Avenue Line | Manhattan | October 27, 1904 | February 2, 1959 | "1" train | Between 96th Street and 86th Street. Closed after platform lengthening of the 96th Street platforms deemed the station to be within proximity. |
| Anderson–Jerome Avenues | A (IRT) | Ninth Avenue elevated | Bronx | July 1, 1918 | August 31, 1958 | | North of the 155th Street station, the elevated line crossed the Harlem River and went into a tunnel, much like the 125th Street subway station comes out of the tunnel onto a high viaduct. This was done in both places to keep the grade of the tracks relatively level. Closed with the discontinuation of the Polo Grounds Shuttle. |
| City Hall | A (IRT) | Lexington Avenue Line | Manhattan | October 27, 1904 | December 31, 1945 | "6" train | South of Brooklyn Bridge–City Hall on a curved balloon loop. Closed due to low ridership, short platform length and the proximity of the busier Brooklyn Bridge–City Hall station. Listed on the National Register of Historic Places. |
| Court Street | B (IND) | Fulton Street Line | Brooklyn | April 9, 1936 | June 1, 1946 | shuttle train | West of Hoyt–Schermerhorn Streets. Closed due to low ridership and proximity to other Downtown Brooklyn stations. Site now houses the New York Transit Museum. |
| Myrtle Avenue | B (BMT) | Fourth Avenue Line | Brooklyn | June 22, 1915 | July 1956 | | Between the Manhattan Bridge and DeKalb Avenue. Closed due to proximity to DeKalb Avenue and construction of a flying junction to ease a choke point in the area. The southbound platform no longer exists; the northbound platform now houses the Masstransiscope zoetrope artwork by Bill Brand visible from Manhattan-bound trains coming from the local track at DeKalb Avenue. |
| Sedgwick Avenue | A (IRT) | Ninth Avenue elevated | Bronx | July 1, 1918 | August 31, 1958 | | North of the 155th Street station, the elevated line crossed the Harlem River and went into a tunnel similarly to how the 125th Street subway station comes out of the tunnel onto a high viaduct. This was done in both places to keep the grade of the tracks relatively level. Closed with the discontinuation of the Polo Grounds Shuttle. |
| South Ferry | A (IRT) | Lexington Avenue Line | Manhattan | July 10, 1905 | February 13, 1977 | "5" train shuttle train | Inner platform of station; south of Bowling Green on a curved balloon loop. Closed due to low ridership, specialized rolling stock requirement and proximity to Bowling Green. |
| South Ferry | A (IRT) | Broadway–Seventh Avenue Line | Manhattan | July 1, 1918 | June 27, 2017 | "1" train "9" train | Outer platform of station; south of Rector Street on a curved balloon loop. Closed due to the opening of the new South Ferry–Whitehall Street station in 2009. Reopened in 2013 when the new station was damaged by Hurricane Sandy, then closed again after the new station was renovated. |
| Worth Street | A (IRT) | Lexington Avenue Line | Manhattan | October 27, 1904 | September 1, 1962 | "6" train | Between Canal Street and Brooklyn Bridge–City Hall. Closed after platform lengthening of the Brooklyn Bridge–City Hall platforms deemed the station to be within proximity. |

== Open stations with closed platforms or entrances ==
=== Closed platforms ===
These stations are currently in operation, but contain abandoned platforms either adjacent to or on another level from the open platforms. The entries under the "Line" column refer to the line in question, even if the line is defunct. The entries under the "Opened" and "Closed" columns refer to the platform in question.

| Station | Division | Line | Borough | Opened | Closed | Former Services | Notes |
|---|---|---|---|---|---|---|---|
| Ninth Avenue | B (BMT) | Culver Line | Brooklyn | March 16, 1919 | May 10, 1975 | shuttle train | Lower platforms of the bi-level Ninth Avenue station. Platforms abandoned after Culver Shuttle service was discontinued. The line between Ninth Ave and Ditmas Avenue was demolished in 1985. |
| Times Square–42nd Street | A (IRT) | 42nd Street Line | Manhattan | October 27, 1904 | 2021 | shuttle train | Built in 1904 as the northbound platform for the Original IRT Subway, used by the 42nd Street Shuttle from 1918 to 2021. |
| 14th Street–Union Square | A (IRT) | Lexington Avenue Line | Manhattan | October 27, 1904 | Approx. 1910 | "6" train | Two side platforms (5-car length) originally used for local service closed due to lengthening of all trains to ten cars, and use of island platforms for cross-platform interchange with express services. |
| 42nd Street–Port Authority Bus Terminal | B (IND) | Eighth Avenue Line | Manhattan | September 10, 1932 | March 1981 | "E" train | The lower-level side platform on the southbound side was built with the upper level but not completed. It was completed in the 1950s and opened in September 1959 for Aqueduct Racetrack express service until that service's cessation in 1981. It was also used for E service during the 1970s and as a crossunder during the station's history. It was partially demolished to make way for the 7 Subway Extension in the late-2000s. |
| 59th Street–Columbus Circle | B (IND) | Eighth Avenue Line | Manhattan | September 10, 1932 | 1981 | "A" train "D" train | The center of three island platforms has been closed since 1981. Trains can't easily open their doors on both sides simultaneously. The edges of the platform were equipped with railings in the late-2000s, and reopened as a transfer passageway to the IRT Broadway–Seventh Avenue Line platforms in 2010. |
| 96th Street | A (IRT) | Broadway–Seventh Avenue Line | Manhattan | October 27, 1904 | April 5, 2010 | "1" train | Two side platforms (5-car length) originally used for local service closed due to lengthening of all trains to ten cars, and use of island platforms for cross-platform interchange with express services. They were used as part of the station's entrances until 2010. |
| Atlantic Avenue | B (BMT) | Fulton Street elevated | Brooklyn | July 4, 1889 | April 26, 1956 | BMT 13 | Formerly a six track, three island platform station. Westernmost island platform still in service for the BMT Canarsie Line. Center island platform still standing, but no tracks are installed. The center island platform was last used in 1956 for Fulton Street elevated service. Easternmost tracks, platform and structure demolished in 2003–2004. |
| Bergen Street | B (IND) | Culver Line | Brooklyn | March 20, 1933 | 1976 | "F" train | When express service on the Culver line ended in 1976, the lower level of this station closed and fell into disrepair. There are no plans to refurbish or reopen this level. |
| Bleecker Street | A (IRT) | Lexington Avenue Line | Manhattan | 1957 | March 26, 2012 | "6" train | Uptown platform lengthened at northern end in 1950s. Uptown platform lengthened at southern end for construction of a transfer to Broadway–Lafayette Street in 2012; Original northern extension closed at the same time. |
| Bowery | B (BMT) | Nassau Street Line | Manhattan | August 4, 1913 | October 2004 | "J" train "Z" train | Due to northbound service being rerouted to the former downtown express track, eastern island platform closed with all service on the western island platform. |
| Bowling Green | A (IRT) | Lexington Avenue Line | Manhattan | July 10, 1905 | February 13, 1977 | shuttle train | Western island platform used for shuttle service to South Ferry. Platform closed when shuttle service was discontinued. |
| Broadway | B (BMT) | Myrtle Avenue Line | Brooklyn | June 25, 1888 | October 4, 1969 | | Upper level. Island platform still standing, but no tracks are installed. |
| Brooklyn Bridge–City Hall | A (IRT) | Lexington Avenue Line | Manhattan | October 27, 1904 | Approx. 1910 | "6" train | Two side platforms (5-car length) originally used for local service closed due to lengthening of all trains to ten cars, and use of island platforms for cross-platform interchange with express services. Curved portions of island platforms at the south end with gap fillers closed. |
| Canal Street | B (BMT) | Nassau Street Line | Manhattan | August 4, 1913 | October 2004 | "J" train "Z" train | Due to northbound service being rerouted to the former downtown express track, eastern island platform closed with all service on the western island platform. |
| Chambers Street | B (BMT) | Nassau Street Line | Manhattan | August 4, 1913 | | "J" train "Z" train | Two side platforms and center island platform closed. Western and eastern island platforms still in service for downtown and uptown services respectively. |
| DeKalb Avenue | B (BMT) | Fourth Avenue Line | Brooklyn | June 22, 1915 | 1960 | "B" train "D" train "N" train "Q" train "R" train | The island platforms were originally extended southward in 1927 on curves. Coincident with the reconstruction of switches, in 1960, the platforms were extended on a straight extension northward and the curved portions were closed. |
| East 180th Street | A (IRT) | Dyre Avenue Line | Bronx | May 15, 1941 | | shuttle train | Island platform east of the current East 180th Street platforms in operation. Platform abandoned after Dyre Avenue Line trains operated through service to the IRT White Plains Road Line. |
| Gun Hill Road | A (IRT) | Third Avenue elevated | Bronx | October 4, 1920 | April 28, 1973 | 8 (New York City Subway service) | Upper level for the subway opened March 3, 1917 as part of the Dual Contracts. The lower level for the elevated was built at the same time but not opened until October 4, 1920. The lower level was an island platform with two tracks. The Third Avenue elevated closed on April 28, 1973. The lower level was demolished as part of a station rebuild in 2004–2006. |
| Hoyt–Schermerhorn Streets | B (IND) | Fulton Street Line | Brooklyn | April 9, 1936 | June 1, 1946 | shuttle train | The two outer platforms were originally open for Court Street service. When that station closed, so did these platforms. |
| Hoyt–Schermerhorn Streets | B (IND) | Fulton Street Line | Brooklyn | September 1959 | March 1981 | shuttle train | The two outer platforms were reopened for Aqueduct Racetrack express service until that service's cessation. |
| Mets–Willets Point | A (IRT) | Flushing Line | Queens | May 7, 1927 | | "7" train | The northern end of the very long southbound side platform is abandoned and gated off. |
| Queensboro Plaza | A (IRT) | Second Avenue elevated | Queens | July 23, 1917 | June 13, 1942 | | Platforms for IRT Flushing Line and BMT Astoria Line still used. |
| Rector Street | B (BMT) | BMT Broadway Line | Manhattan | January 5, 1918 | | "R" train | The north end of the southbound side platform is walled off. The rest of the station is still in use. |
| Van Cortlandt Park–242nd Street | A (IRT) | Broadway–Seventh Avenue Line | Bronx | August 1, 1908 | | "1" train | Two side platforms (5-car length) closed due to lengthening of all trains to ten cars. |
| Wakefield–241st Street | A (IRT) | White Plains Road Line | Bronx | December 13, 1920 | | "2" train | Two side platforms (5-car length) closed due to lengthening of all trains to ten cars. |
| Woodlawn | A (IRT) | Jerome Avenue Line | Bronx | April 15, 1918 | | "4" train | Two side platforms (5-car length) closed due to lengthening of all trains to ten cars. |

=== Closed entrances ===
In response to a request made by State Senator Martin Dilan, the Metropolitan Transportation Authority (MTA) stated that 119 stations either had a closed street stair or closed control area, and that 130 stations had closed entrances. Within these 130 stations, there are 114 closed control areas and 298 closed street stairs. 188 of these were connected to closed control areas, with the remainder connected to control areas that remain open. Of these, many entrances were closed between the 1970s and 1990s due to legitimate crime concerns, due to low ridership, and to cut costs. As crime has decreased, and as ridership has gone up, these entrances, for the most part have not been revisited. During some station renovation projects, closed entrances have been reopened. New York City Comptroller Scott Stringer delivered a letter to the New York City Transit Authority President Andy Byford in January 2020, demanding that the MTA develop, and make public, plans for restoring abundance of unavailable entryways along subway routes. The "long-shuttered entry points" contribute to severe overcrowding at stations and longer commute times.

== Unfinished stations ==
These stations saw some construction but were left unfinished. The entries under the "Station" column refer to the station in which the unfinished station was built around.

| Station | Division | Proposed Line | Borough | Notes |
|---|---|---|---|---|
| Broadway | B (IND) | Worth Street Line | Brooklyn | Upper level with four island platforms and six tracks (similar to Hoyt–Schermerhorn Streets) partially built for the IND Second System. |
| City Hall | B (BMT) | Broadway Line | Manhattan | Lower level with two island platforms and three tracks. The platforms were intended to serve express trains, but express trains were instead routed over the Manhattan Bridge. |
| East Broadway | B (IND) | Worth Street Line | Manhattan | Upper level with two side platforms and two tracks. Space was set aside for the IND Second System, but never completed. Part of unfinished station is now the mezzanine. |
| Second Avenue | B (IND) | Second Avenue Line | Manhattan | Upper level with two side platforms, one island platform, and four tracks (similar to 34th Street–Penn Station). Space was set aside for the IND Second System, but never completed. Part of unfinished station was part of the mezzanine. |
| Jackson Heights–Roosevelt Avenue | B (IND) | Winfield Spur and Queens Boulevard Line | Queens | Upper level with an island platform (for 8-car trains) and two trackways partially built for the IND Second System. The station is tiled and had blank signs, but no tracks or signals have been installed. The platform itself was repurposed into employee facilities. |
| Nevins Street | A (IRT) | Provisional IRT service on Fulton Street or Fourth Avenue | Brooklyn | Lower level with one side platform and one track partially built for a provisional IRT expansion. The provisional lines the platform would have served are now the IND Fulton Street Line and the BMT Fourth Avenue Line. |
| Utica Avenue | B (IND) | Utica Avenue Line | Brooklyn | Upper level with two island platforms and four tracks partially built for the IND Second System. |

== Demolished stations on existing lines ==
These stations have been demolished, with little or no infrastructure in existence. This list only includes stations demolished on existing lines; for lines that have been demolished, see defunct lines.

| Station | Division | Line | Borough | Opened | Closed | Notes |
|---|---|---|---|---|---|---|
| 180th Street–Bronx Park | A (IRT) | White Plains Road Line | Bronx | November 26, 1904 | August 4, 1952 | Former terminal station prior to the extension of the IRT White Plains Road Line. The next station south was West Farms Square–East Tremont Avenue. |
| 221st Street | A (IRT) | Broadway–Seventh Avenue Line | Manhattan | March 12, 1906 | January 14, 1907 | The temporary terminus of the IRT West Side Line until the opening of the new terminal station, Marble Hill–225th Street. |
| Dean Street | B (BMT) | Franklin Avenue Line | Brooklyn | August 15, 1896 | September 10, 1995 | Between Franklin Avenue and Park Place stations. Demolished as part of the reconstruction of the BMT Franklin Avenue Line; also closed due to low ridership and proximity to adjacent stations. |
| Park Avenue | B (BMT) | Jamaica Line | Brooklyn | June 25, 1888 | June 5, 1916 | Between Myrtle Avenue and Flushing Avenue stations; demolished during the Dual Contracts rebuild. |

== See also ==
- New York City Subway stations
- List of New York City Subway stations
- List of New York City Subway transfer stations
- List of New York City Subway terminals
- List of Staten Island Railway stations
- Accessibility of the Metropolitan Transportation Authority
- History of the New York City Subway
- New York City Subway nomenclature
- Ghost station
