= Sumner Avenue station (BMT Myrtle Avenue Line) =

Sumner Avenue
- Former New York City Subway station

Station statistics
- Address: Myrtle Avenue & Sumner Avenue (Marcus Garvey Boulevard); Brooklyn, NY 11206
- Borough: Brooklyn
- Locale: Bedford–Stuyvesant
- Coordinates: 40.696366°N 73.940686°W
- Division: B (BMT)
- Services: BMT Myrtle Avenue Line
- Structure: Elevated
- Platforms: 1 island platform
- Tracks: 2

Other information
- Opened: April 27, 1889; 137 years ago
- Closed: October 4, 1969; 56 years ago

Station succession
- Next west: Tompkins Avenue
- Next east: Broadway
Location

Street map
Station service legend
Symbol	Description
Stops all times	Stops in station at all times
Stops all times except late nights	Stops all times except late nights
Stops late nights only	Stops late nights only
Stops late nights and weekends	Stops late nights and weekends only
Stops weekdays during the day	Stops weekdays during the day
Stops weekends during the day	Stops weekends during the day
Stops all times except rush hours in the peak direction	Stops all times except rush hours in the peak direction
Stops all times except weekdays in the peak direction	Stops all times except weekdays in the peak direction
Stops daily except rush hours in the peak direction	Stops all times except nights and rush hours in the peak direction
Stops rush hours only	Stops rush hours only
Stops rush hours in the peak direction only	Stops rush hours in the peak direction only
Station closed	Station is closed
(Details about time periods)

The Sumner Avenue station was a station on the demolished section of the BMT Myrtle Avenue Line. The station was located at the intersection of Myrtle Avenue and Sumner Avenues (now Marcus Garvey Boulevard) in Bedford–Stuyvesant, Brooklyn. The station opened in 1889, and closed in 1969.

== History ==
The Myrtle Avenue Elevated was constructed by the Union Elevated Railroad Company, which was leased to the Brooklyn Elevated Railroad for its operation. The initial section of the line opened on April 10, 1888, running over Myrtle Avenue from Johnson and Adams Streets to a junction with what was then known as the Main Line at Grand Avenue. Trains continued along Grand Avenue and Lexington Avenue to Broadway, where the line joined the Broadway Elevated, and then along Broadway to East New York. On April 27, 1889, the line was extended east along Myrtle Avenue to Broadway, including a station at Sumner Avenue.

On October 4, 1969, the section of the Myrtle Avenue Elevated between Broadway and Jay Street, including Sumner Avenue station, was closed and was demolished soon after.

== Station layout ==
This elevated station had two tracks and one island platform. The station's platform was wooden.
