= Marcy Avenue station =

New York City Subway station in Brooklyn

Marcy Avenue
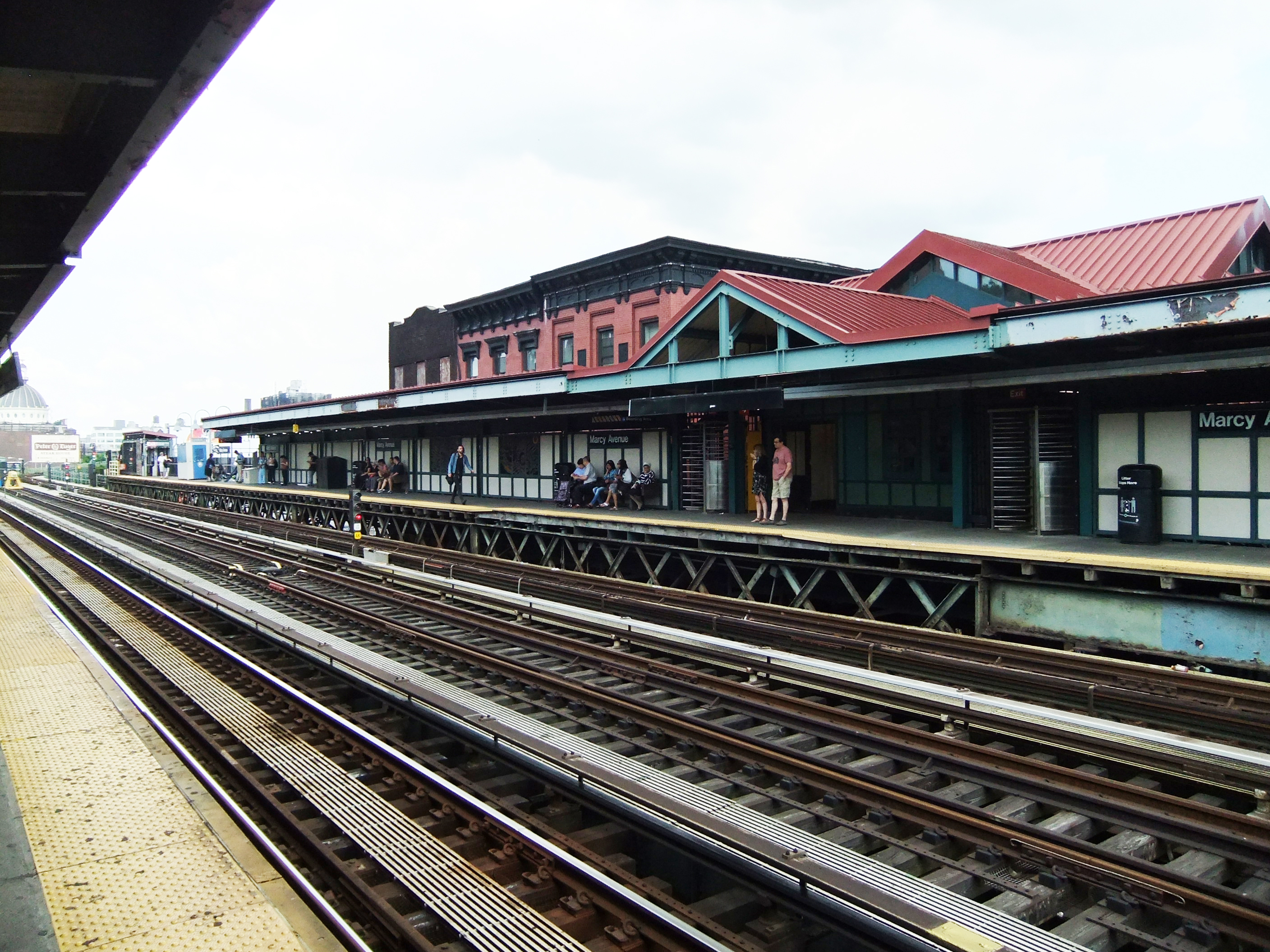
- View from the eastbound platform

Station statistics
- Address: Marcy Avenue and Broadway; Brooklyn, New York
- Borough: Brooklyn
- Locale: Williamsburg
- Coordinates: 40.708361°N 73.957944°W
- Division: B (BMT)
- Line: BMT Jamaica Line
- Services: J (all times); M (all times except late nights); Z (rush hours, peak direction)
- Transit: NYCT Bus: B24, B32, B39, B44, B44 SBS, B46, B60, B62, Q54, Q59 (at Williamsburg Bridge Plaza Bus Terminal); NYC Ferry: East River (at South Williamsburg Landing)
- Structure: Elevated
- Platforms: 2 side platforms
- Tracks: 3 (2 in passenger service)

Other information
- Opened: June 25, 1888; 138 years ago
- Accessible: Yes

Traffic
- 2025: 2,975,934 ▲4.7%
- Rank: 128 out of 423
Services
Preceding station	New York City Subway	Following station
Essex Street J M Z westbound	J/Z (New York City Subway service)	Myrtle Avenue J Z skip-stop
Essex Street J M Z westbound	J/Z (New York City Subway service)	Myrtle Avenue J Z skip-stop
Essex Street J M Z westbound	J/Z (New York City Subway service)	Hewes Street J M via Myrtle Avenue
Essex Street J M Z westbound	Local	Hewes Street J M via Myrtle Avenue
Non-revenue services and lines
Preceding station	New York City Subway	Following station
Driggs Avenue demolished	no service	
Location
Location within New York City Subway
Location within New York City
Location within New York
Track layout
Street map
Station service legend
Symbol	Description
Stops all times except rush hours in the peak direction	Stops all times except rush hours in the peak direction
Stops all times	Stops all times
Stops rush hours in the peak direction only	Stops rush hours in the peak direction only
Stops all times except late nights	Stops all times except late nights

The Marcy Avenue station is a station on the BMT Jamaica Line of the New York City Subway. Located at the intersection of Marcy Avenue and Broadway in Brooklyn, it is served by the J train at all times, the M train at all times except late nights, and the Z train during rush hours in the peak direction.

== History ==
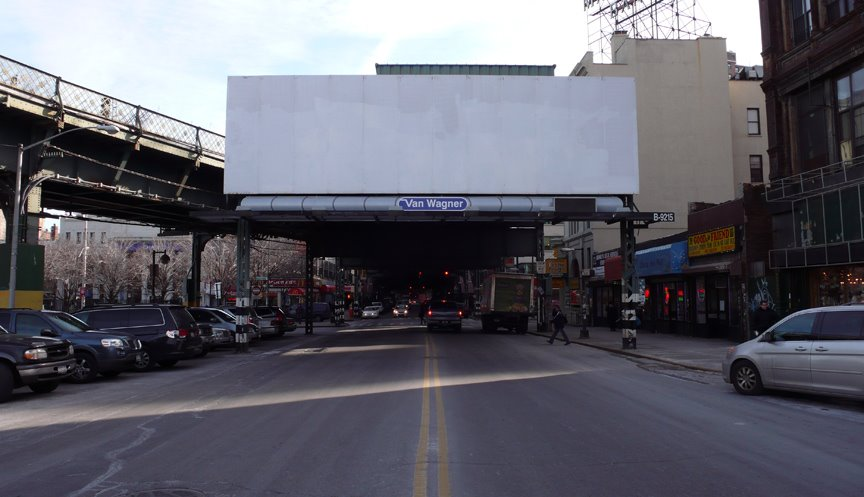
Remains of the Broadway Ferry spur behind the billboard

This station opened on June 25, 1888, when the Union Elevated Railroad (leased to the Brooklyn Elevated Railroad) extended its elevated line above Broadway from Gates Avenue northwest to Driggs Avenue in Williamsburg. This was a branch of the existing Lexington Avenue Elevated, which then ended at Van Siclen Avenue; Broadway trains ran between Driggs and Van Siclen Avenues. The Broadway Elevated was extended to Broadway Ferry on July 14, 1888. Upon the opening of the Williamsburg Bridge tracks in 1908, trains were rerouted across the bridge west of Marcy Avenue.

The Dual Contracts expansion projects radically changed operations at Marcy Avenue. A third track was added, allowing trains to run express, although the track remains as a stub-end at Marcy Avenue for storage and turn-arounds. The Contracts also provided for the merger of the Jamaica Line from Broadway Junction to 168th Street with the Broadway Elevated, in turn making the Broadway Elevated part of the Jamaica Line and giving trains three eastern terminals (168th Street, Canarsie–Rockaway Parkway, and Middle Village–Metropolitan Avenue).

On April 13, 1954, the enlarged station platform at Marcy Avenue was opened, as well as the expanded stairway facilities. In 1982, the Urban Mass Transportation Administration gave a $66 million grant to the New York City Transit Authority. Part of the grant was to be used for the renovation of several subway stations, including Marcy Avenue. In 2002, the Metropolitan Transportation Authority announced that elevators would be installed at the Marcy Avenue station.

As part of the 2015–2019 Metropolitan Transportation Authority's Capital Program, station capacity enhancements will be made at the station. The project will assess the feasibility of widening and reconstructing the stairs at Havemeyer Street, widening the westerly outbound platform, and widening the platform level fare control areas to fit in an additional low-level turnstile. Design work started in April 2017 and will be finished in December 2017, with construction set to begin in April 2018. In December 2021, the MTA awarded a contract for the replacement of the Marcy Avenue station's elevators, to be completed by late 2023 or early 2024.

== Station layout ==
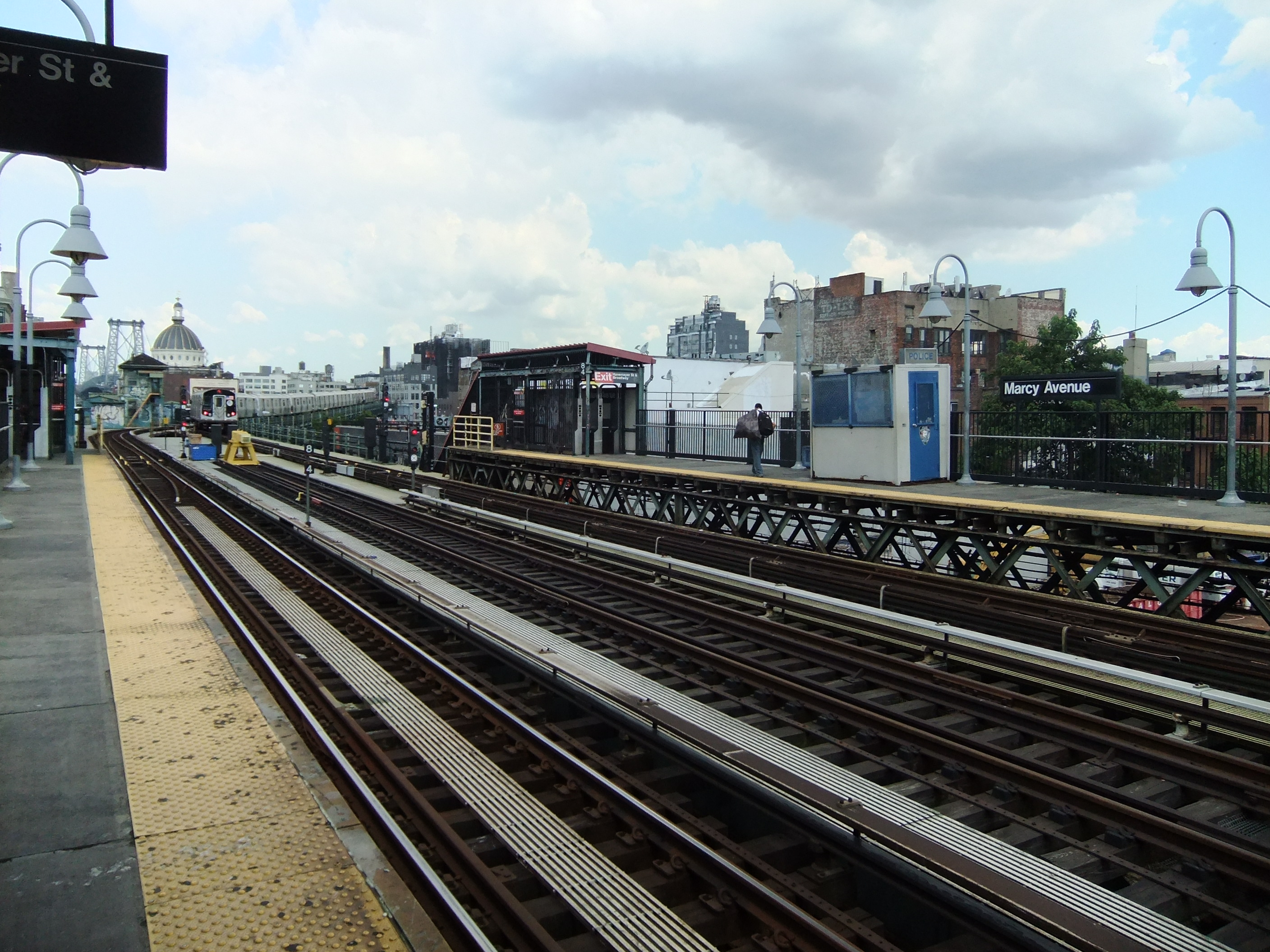
View from the eastbound platform, looking west

This station has two side platforms and three tracks and is the westernmost station on the Jamaica Line. The station is served by the J at all times, the M except at night and the Z only in the peak direction during rush hours. All trains run on the outer two local tracks, while the center express track dead ends at the west end at a bumper block and is unusable for service. The next stop to the west (heading towards Manhattan) is Essex Street for all service. The next stop to the east (heading toward Queens) is Hewes Street for local J and M trains, and Myrtle Avenue for express J and Z trains.

Both platforms have beige windscreens and red canopies with green frames that run along the entire length except for a section at the southeast (railroad south), where they have waist-high black steel fences. During the 1999 reconstruction of the Williamsburg Bridge, a temporary platform was erected over the center track for the station's use as a terminal station.

Just west of this station, there is a short section of trackway continuing straight which once led to the Broadway Ferry Spur. As now configured, westbound trains run over the Williamsburg Bridge, connecting to the BMT Nassau Street Line in Manhattan. To the east, there are switches that allow access to the center express track, which is used by J and Z trains when they run express between this station and Myrtle Avenue in the peak direction only on weekdays during rush hours and middays.

The 2004 artwork here is called Space Odyssey by Ellsworth Ausby. It consists of eight triptychs on the platform windscreens, with stained glass windows depicting space travel.

=== Exits ===
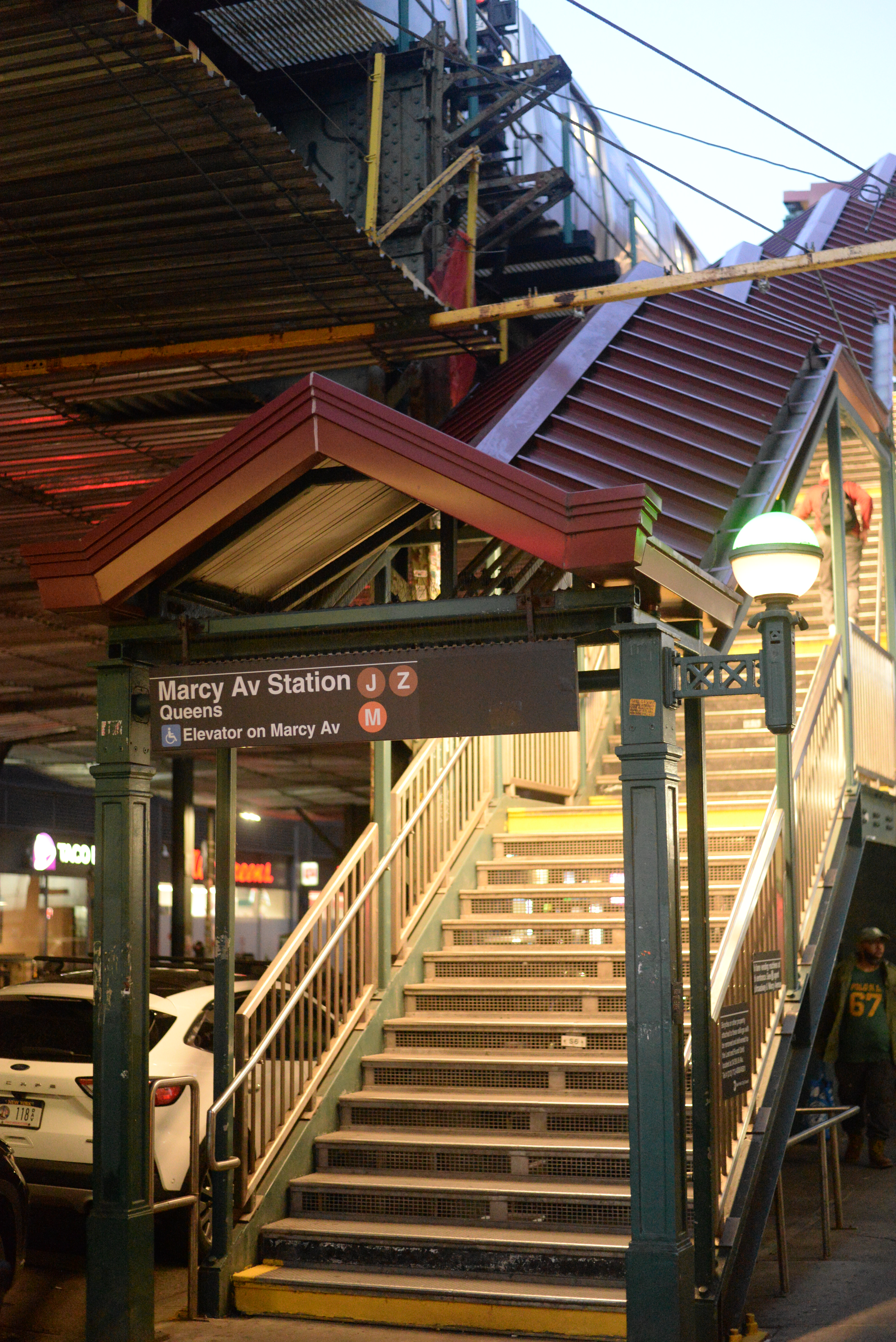
Southwest corner entrance, with a J train arriving overhead

All four fare control areas of the station are on platform level. As a result, there is no free transfer between directions. The primary ones, are elevated station houses adjacent to the platforms. Each station house has doors leading to the stairs and platform, turnstile bank, token booth, and two stairs and one ADA-accessible elevator to the street. The stairs from the Manhattan-bound station house go down to either northern corner of Marcy Avenue and Broadway while the stair from the Queens-bound station house go down to either southern corners. The elevators go down to either western corner of Marcy Avenue and Broadway, with the Queens-bound elevator on the southwest corner and the Manhattan-bound elevator on the northwest corner.

Both platforms have a HEET turnstile entrance/exit at their extreme west end that was added during a 1990s renovation. Each leads to a canopied staircase that goes down to either side of Broadway near Havemeyer Street.

== In popular culture ==
The Ludo music video for "Hum Along," from their 2004 self-titled debut album, involves the author and subject meeting outside the SE entry.

The home of the character Dave Stutler in the 2010 film The Sorcerer's Apprentice is located near this station. Stutler is also attacked by a wolf in this station.

The fictional neighborhood of "Little Wadiya", from the 2012 film The Dictator, is located near to this station. The choice may be related to the presence of the Hasidic Jewish Community in Williamsburg.

Flight of the Conchords are seen emerging from Marcy Avenue station singing the song Inner City Pressure during season 1, episode 2 of their eponymous TV show.
