= Ellsworth Augustus Ausby =

American visual artist (1942–2011)

- Born: April 5, 1942; Portsmouth, Virginia, U.S.
- Died: March 6, 2011 (aged 68); New York City, U.S.
- Education: School of Visual Arts; Pratt Institute (BFA)
- Occupations: Visual artist; educator

Ellsworth Augustus Ausby (April 5, 1942 – March 6, 2011) was an African-American visual artist and educator known for his abstract work and experimentation with supports and surfaces.

== Life ==
Born in Portsmouth, Virginia, Ausby attended both the School of Visual Arts and the Pratt Institute, earning a Bachelor's of Fine Arts from the latter institution. For a time, he worked as a waiter in the famous Slugs' Saloon, where he crossed paths with Salvador Dalí, saw Sun Ra perform, and witnessed the shooting of Lee Morgan.

Ausby taught painting at the School of Visual Arts from 1979 until his death in 2011, and remained an active professional artist until his death. He had four children and was married twice, first to culinary anthropologist Vertamae Smart-Grosvenor, and then to activist artist Jamillah Jennings, with whom he founded Nefer International Gallery. The gallery, based out of their Brooklyn home, was founded with the goal of exhibiting the work of Black artists in their community and encouraging those with means to collect more work by Black artists.

In 1980, Ausby participated in a series of meetings hosted by the New Museum, the Minority Artists’ Dialog, dedicated to discussing issues within the visual arts community and addressing the underrepresentation of nonwhite artists. Following the discussion series, Ausby aided the New Museum in organizing and curating the final installation in the Events: Fashion Moda, Taller Boricua, Artists Invite Artists exhibition.

Ellsworth Ausby died in 2011 in Brooklyn, New York.

== Work ==
Ausby worked in a variety of mediums, including canvas, sculpture, stained glass, and performance art. He often worked with traditional African forms and palettes. Many of his paintings, such as Meditation in Blue, employ the style of Hard-edge painting. Some of his later art, such as his work in stained glass, reflect the sensibilities of the Pattern and Decoration movement.

He was heavily inspired by the music of Sun Ra, and in the late 1970s began his series of geometric experimentation paintings titled Space Odyssey, named as such to reflect this connection to Sun Ra’s afrofuturist philosophies. He would continue to work on the series for several years. As time went on, Ausby began to incorporate more three-dimensional elements into his work, mixing substances such as sawdust into his paint in order to create more textured works and incorporating relief elements which extended off the surface of the canvas. He often used unstretched canvas in his work, which would be attached directly to gallery walls and other structural supports to create dynamic three-dimensional shapes for exhibition.

In 1978 and 1979, Ausby received artist grants through the Cultural Council Foundation Artists’ Project, which was funded under the Comprehensive Employment and Training Act. Through these grants, Ausby was able to direct the multimedia performance piece InnerSpace/OuterSpace, which was performed in Union Square and at the Museum of Natural History, New York and incorporated projections of his paintings and sculptures. In 2005, Ausby was commissioned by the MTA to design the stained-glass piece Space Odyssey, which is now installed at the Marcy Avenue station in Williamsburg, Brooklyn.

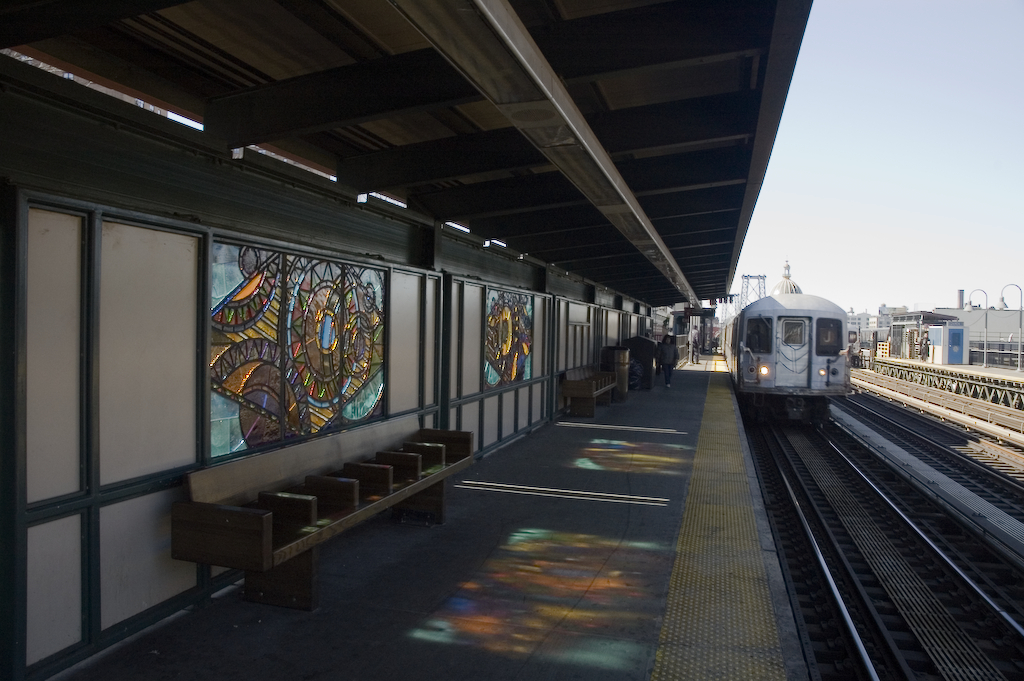
Marcy Avenue station stained glass

His Meditation in Blue (1998), a geometric abstraction in acrylic, is housed in the Saint Louis Art Museum permanent collection.

Ausby's work has been shown in both solo and collective exhibitions.

Known exhibitions
Year	Title	Institution	Notes
1969	New Black Artists	Brooklyn Museum	
1970	Unknown	Cinque Gallery	First solo exhibition. Gallery now closed.
1970	Afro-American Artists, New York and Boston	Museum of Fine Arts, Boston	
1971	Some American History	Rice University Institute for the Arts, Houston	Commissioned by the Menil Foundation.
1971	Contemporary Black Artists in America	Whitney Museum of American Art, New York	
1972	Ellsworth Ausby and James Phillips: Paintings	Peale House Galleries, Pennsylvania Academy of the Fine Arts	
1980	Afro-American Abstraction	MoMA PS1	First “Space Odyssey” polyptych displayed.
2021	Ellsworth Ausby: Somewhere in Space, Paintings from the 1960s and 1970s	Eric Firestone Gallery	
