= Myrtle Avenue station (BMT Jamaica Line) =

New York City Subway station in Brooklyn

Myrtle Avenue
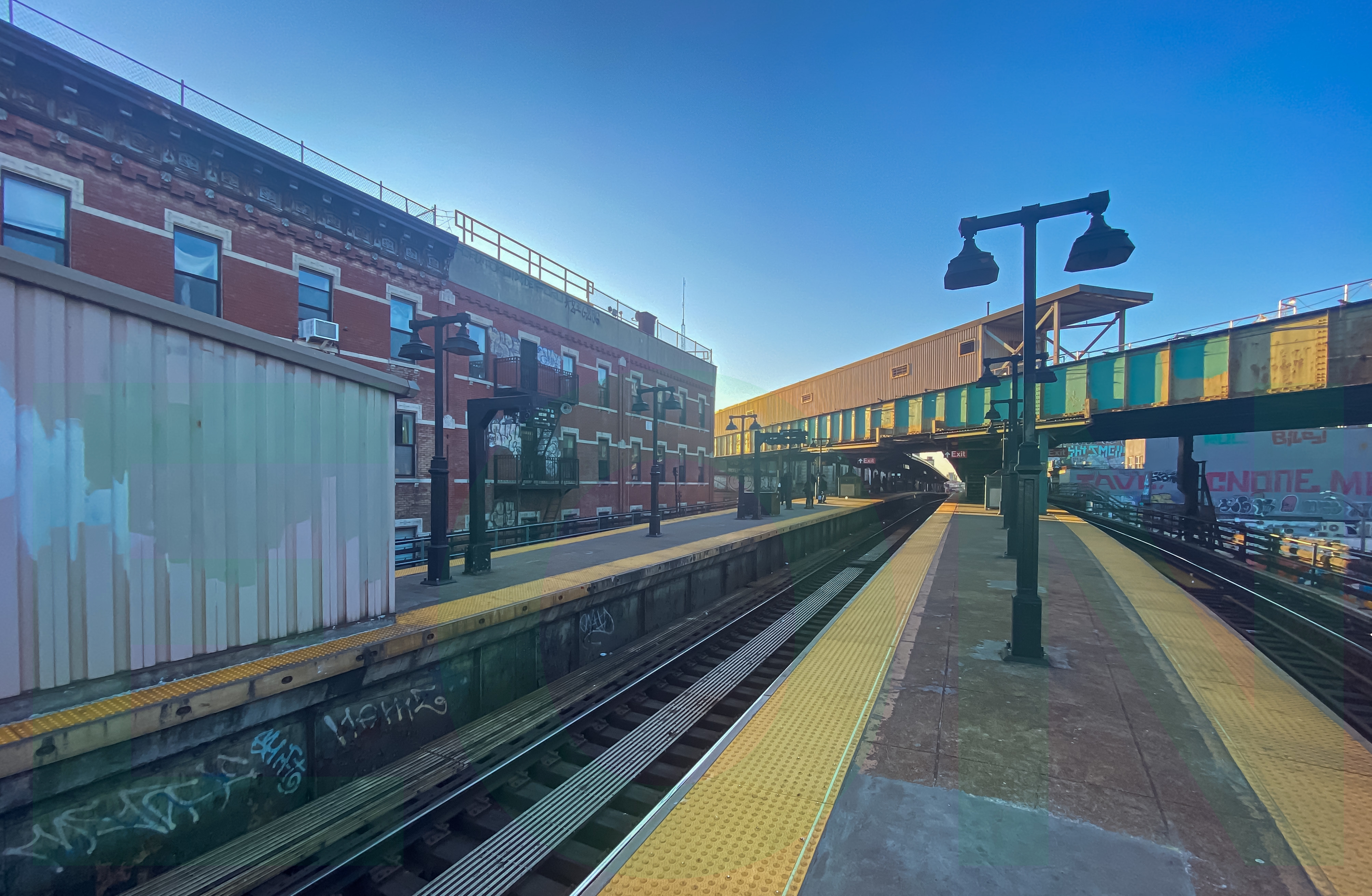
- Station platforms, facing west

Station statistics
- Address: Myrtle Avenue and Broadway; Brooklyn, New York
- Borough: Brooklyn
- Locale: Bushwick / Bedford–Stuyvesant
- Coordinates: 40°41′49″N 73°56′7″W
- Division: B (BMT)
- Line: BMT Jamaica Line; BMT Myrtle Avenue Line (formerly)
- Services: J (all times); M (all times); Z (rush hours, peak direction)
- Transit: NYCT Bus: B15, B46, B47, B54
- Structure: Elevated
- Levels: 2 (upper level abandoned)
- Platforms: 3 island platforms (2 in service (lower level), 1 disused (upper level)) cross-platform interchange (lower level)
- Tracks: 3 (lower level), 2 (upper level; removed)

Other information
- Opened: June 25, 1888; 138 years ago (lower level); April 27, 1889; 137 years ago (upper level)
- Closed: October 4, 1969; 57 years ago (upper level)
- Accessible: No; under construction
- Accessibility: Cross-platform transfer available
- Former/other names: Myrtle Avenue–Broadway

Traffic
- 2025: 2,905,198 ▲4.4%
- Rank: 132 out of 423
Services
Preceding station	New York City Subway	Following station
Marcy Avenue J Z express tracks skip-stop	J/Z (New York City Subway service)	Gates Avenue Z skip-stop
Marcy Avenue J Z express tracks skip-stop	J/Z (New York City Subway service)	Kosciuszko Street J toward Jamaica Center–York College
Flushing Avenue J M via Essex Street	J/Z (New York City Subway service)	Kosciuszko Street J toward Jamaica Center–York College
Flushing Avenue J M via Essex Street	Local	Central Avenue M toward Middle Village–Metropolitan Avenue
Non-revenue services and lines
Preceding station	New York City Subway	Following station
Park Avenue local; demolished	no service	Broadway Junction express
Sumner Avenue Myrtle Ave; demolished	no service	Evergreen Avenue Myrtle Ave
Location
Location within New York City Subway
Location within New York City
Location within New York
Track layout
Lower level
Upper level (abandoned)
Street map
Station service legend
Symbol	Description
Stops all times except late nights	Stops all times except late nights
Stops all times except rush hours in the peak direction	Stops all times except rush hours in the peak direction
Stops late nights only	Stops late nights only
Stops rush hours in the peak direction only	Stops rush hours in the peak direction only

The Myrtle Avenue station (announced on New Technology Trains as the Myrtle Avenue–Broadway station) is a New York City Subway express station on the BMT Jamaica Line. Located at the intersection of Myrtle Avenue and Broadway at the border of Bedford–Stuyvesant and Bushwick, Brooklyn, it is served by the J and M trains at all times (the latter of which originates and terminates here during the night), and by the Z train during rush hours in peak direction.

The station has two platform levels, but all regular passenger service is on the lower platform level of the station. The station has an abandoned upper platform level which previously served the BMT Myrtle Avenue Line to Downtown Brooklyn and Lower Manhattan via the Brooklyn Bridge. Just east of the station, the remaining section of the BMT Myrtle Avenue Line diverges from the BMT Jamaica Line via slip switches in an at-grade junction.

== History ==
The lower level of the station opened on June 25, 1888, when the Union Elevated Railroad (leased to the Brooklyn Elevated Railroad) extended its elevated line above Broadway from Gates Avenue northwest to Driggs Avenue in Williamsburg. The Broadway Elevated was extended to Broadway Ferry on July 14, 1888. Upon the opening of the Williamsburg Bridge tracks in 1908, trains were rerouted across the bridge west of Marcy Avenue.

The upper level station, which was marked on signs as Broadway, opened on April 27, 1889, when the Myrtle Avenue Line was extended east along Myrtle Avenue to Broadway. This extension created a transfer opportunity for the BMT Jamaica Line station. The previous station located nearby on Broadway at Stuyvesant Avenue was then closed. The Myrtle Avenue Line was extended from this station to Wyckoff Avenue on July 21, 1889.

The BMT Myrtle Avenue Line from Broadway to Bridge–Jay Streets closed on October 4, 1969, and was replaced via transfer to the B54 bus toward Jay Street.

In 2019, the Metropolitan Transportation Authority announced that this station would become ADA-accessible as part of the agency's 2020–2024 Capital Program. The MTA received $254 million from the Federal Transit Administration in 2023 for accessibility upgrades to four subway stations, including the Myrtle Avenue station. Work on new elevators began in December 2024. In October 2026, the MTA announced plans to install taller fare gates with glass panels at 20 additional stations, including the Myrtle Avenue station, following a successful pilot program at earlier stations.

== Station layout ==
=== Lower level ===
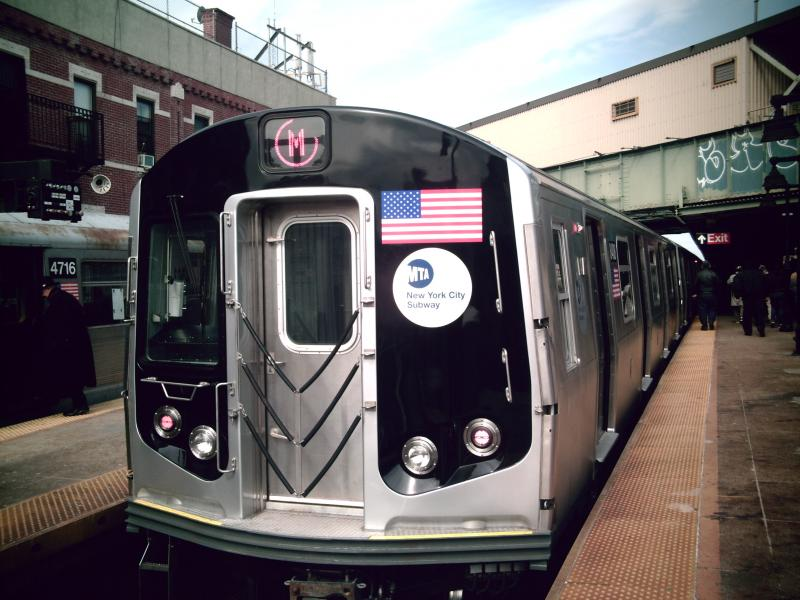
A weekend R160A M shuttle train on the center track prior to the extension of weekend M service from Myrtle Avenue to Essex Street

This elevated station on the lower level, has three tracks and two island platforms. The station is served by the J and M at all times and by the Z only during rush hours in the peak direction. The next station to the east (heading toward Queens) is Kosciuszko Street for J trains, Gates Avenue for Z trains, and Central Avenue for M trains. The next station to the west (heading towards Manhattan) is Flushing Avenue for local J and M trains, and Marcy Avenue for express J and Z trains.

The center track is used by J and Z trains when they run express between this station and Marcy Avenue in the peak direction only on weekdays during rush hours and middays, as well as to terminate overnight M shuttle trains from Metropolitan Avenue. East of this station, J and Z trains continue along Broadway, while M trains branch off through an S curve towards the BMT Myrtle Avenue Line. The connection to the Myrtle Avenue Line is one of the few remaining level junctions in the subway as well as one of the few places on revenue tracks with slip switches. From June 2017 until April 2018, this connection was closed due to long-term construction on the Myrtle Avenue Line.

This station is announced as Myrtle Avenue–Broadway station on New Technology Train cars to distinguish it from the nearby Myrtle–Wyckoff Avenues station.

Both platforms have brown canopies with green support columns and frames for their entire length except for a small section at either end. The station signs are in the standard black plates in white lettering.

The 1999 artwork here is called Jammin' Under the El by Verna Hart. It consists of stained glass windows on the platforms' sign structures as well as the station house depicting various scenes related to music.

As part of the Metropolitan Transportation Authority's 2015–2019 Capital Program, a station entrance will be rebuilt at the northwestern corner of Jefferson Street and Broadway, and a second mezzanine will be reopened. In 2019, the MTA announced that this station would become ADA-accessible as part of the agency's 2020–2024 Capital Program.

=== Upper level ===
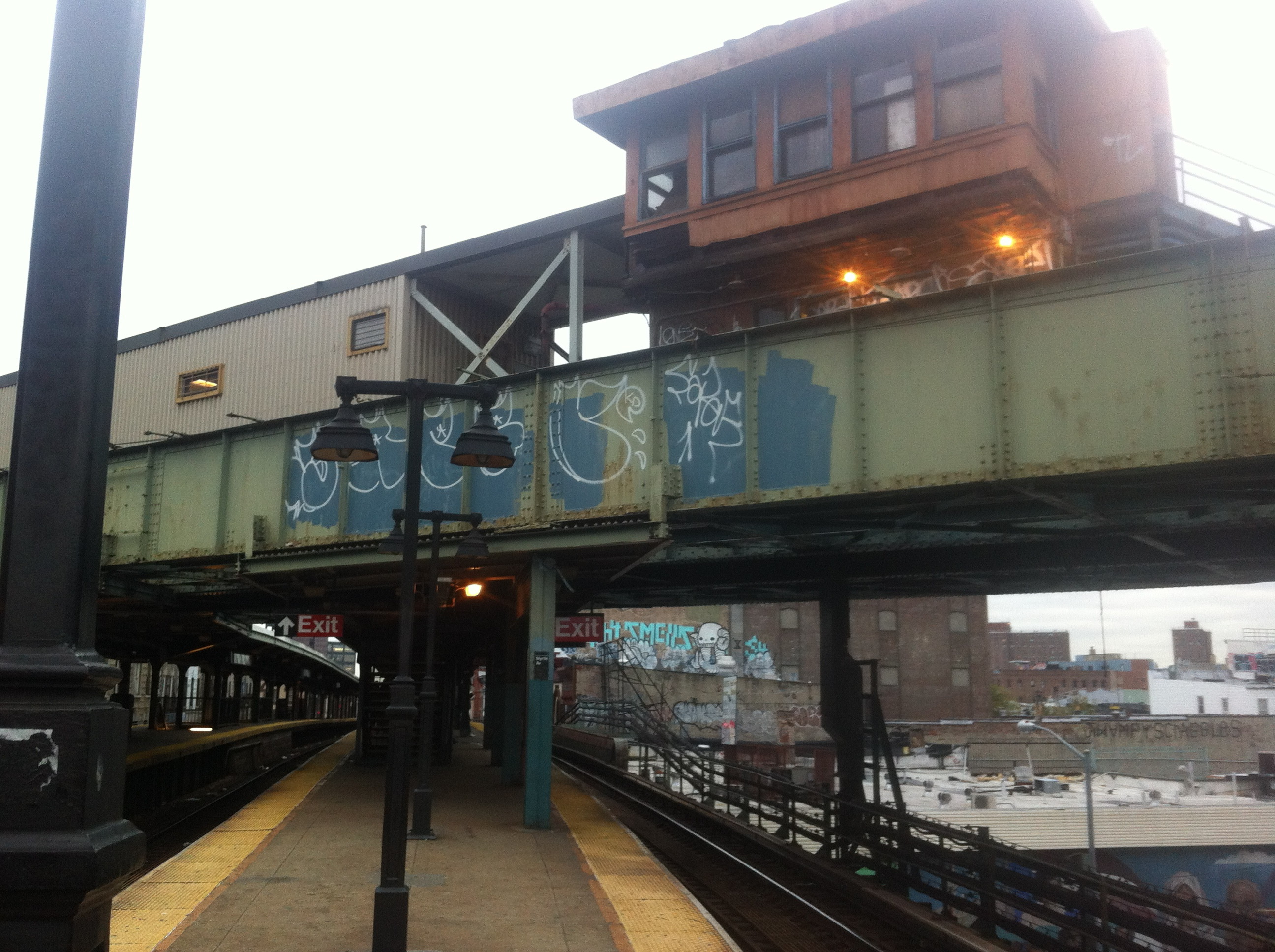
The abandoned upper level

The upper level station (which was marked on signs as Broadway) opened on April 27, 1889, and created a transfer opportunity to the BMT Jamaica Line. The upper level station contained two tracks and an island platform, with stairs to both of the existing platforms on the lower level. The Myrtle Avenue upper level was extended to Wyckoff Avenue on July 21, 1889. The BMT Myrtle Avenue Line from Broadway to Bridge–Jay Streets closed on October 4, 1969, and was replaced via transfer to the B54 bus toward Jay Street.

=== Exits ===
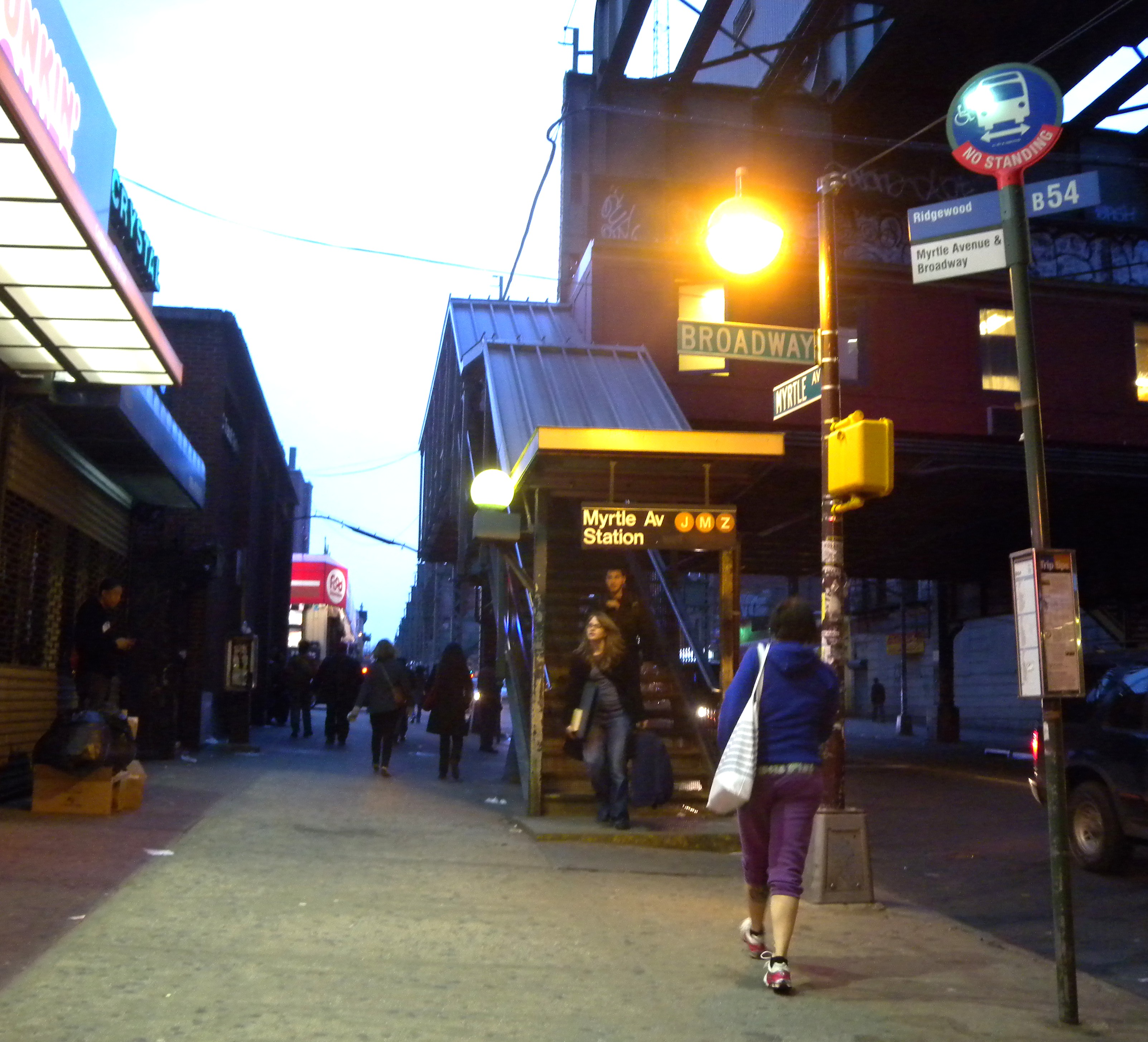
Station entrance

The lower level station has an elevated station house to the west underneath the skeletal remains of the BMT Myrtle Avenue Line. Two staircases from each platform go down to an elevated cross-under, where a shorter staircase on the Queens-bound side leads to the station house's waiting area. Outside the turnstile bank, there is a token booth and two staircases going down to either of the western corners at Myrtle Avenue and Broadway.

== In popular culture ==
In the 1990 drama Ghost, Patrick Swayze follows his killer, Rick Aviles, leaving the J train onto the station's platform and entrance. In 1994, it was shown in the music video for Here Comes the Hotstepper by Jamaican dancehall artist Ini Kamoze.
