= Broadway (Brooklyn) =

Roadway in Brooklyn, New York

Coordinates: 40°41′39.29″N 73°55′48.68″W

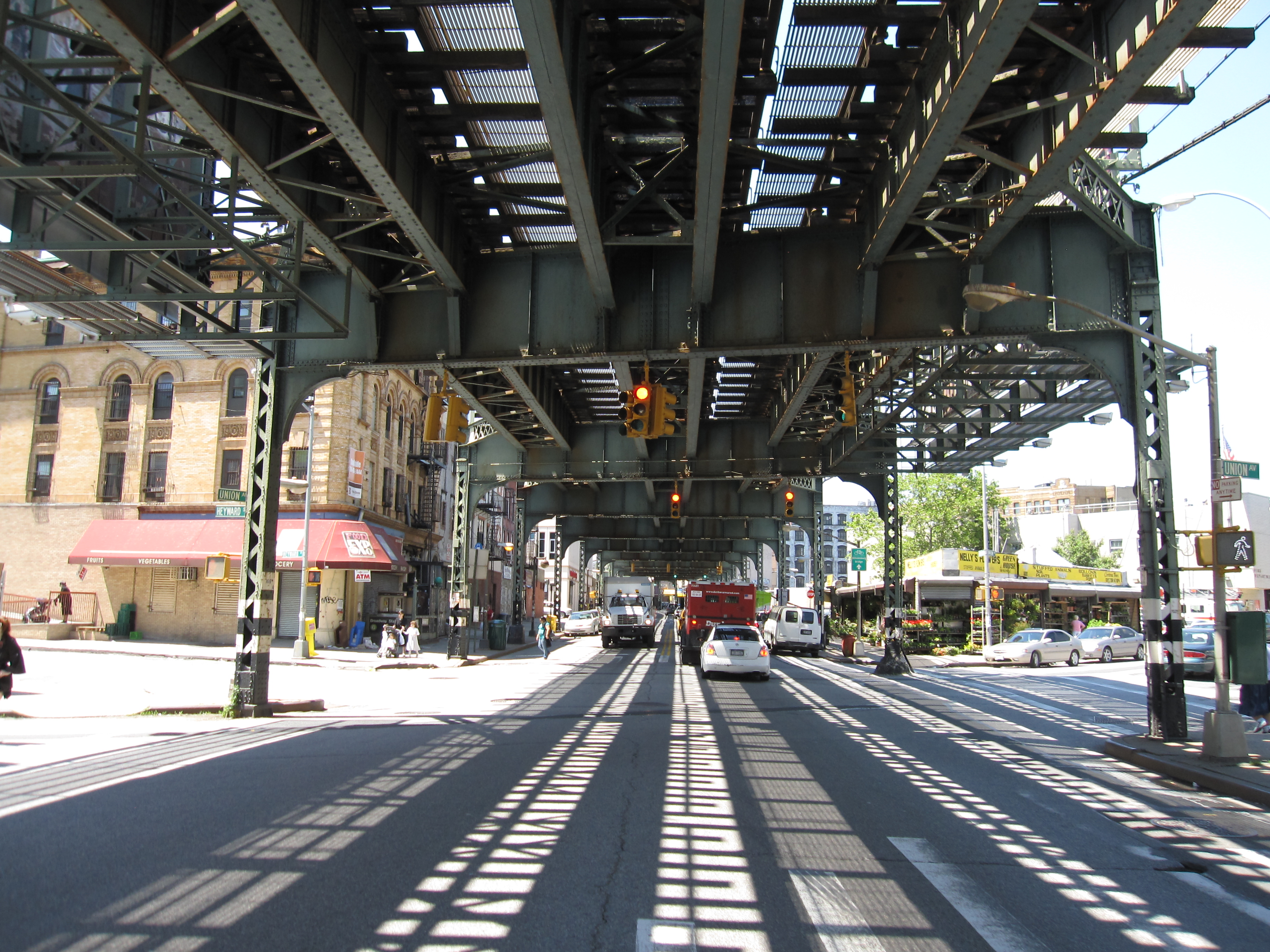
- Broadway at Union Avenue
- Interactive map of Broadway
- Owner: City of New York
- Maintained by: NYCDOT
- Length: 4.4 mi (7.1 km)
- Location: Brooklyn
- Postal code: 11211 11206 11221 11207
- Nearest metro station: Jamaica Line; Broadway

Broadway is a roadway in the New York City borough of Brooklyn that extends from the East River in the neighborhood of Williamsburg in a southeasterly direction to East New York for a length of 4.32 miles (6.95 km). It was named for the Broadway in Manhattan. The East New York terminus is a complicated intersection with East New York Avenue, Fulton Street, Jamaica Avenue, and Alabama Avenue. The BMT Jamaica Line (J, M, and Z trains) of the New York City Subway runs on elevated tracks over Broadway from the Williamsburg Bridge to East New York on its way to Queens. Broadway forms the boundary between the neighborhoods of Bushwick, which lies above Broadway to the northeast, and Bedford–Stuyvesant, which is to the southwest.

== History ==
When Williamsburg was an independent city, the length of Broadway from the East River to South 6th Street was known as South 7th Street. From that point to Division Avenue, it took over the path of South 6th Street. Both of these segments opened in the 1830s. From that intersection to its terminus in East New York it was named Division Avenue, which was laid on the municipal boundaries separating the city of Brooklyn from the town of Bushwick (and village of Williamsburg, which was then part of the town). At each of the roadbed changes in Williamsburg, Broadway bends a little more to the south until it runs straight southeast to East New York.

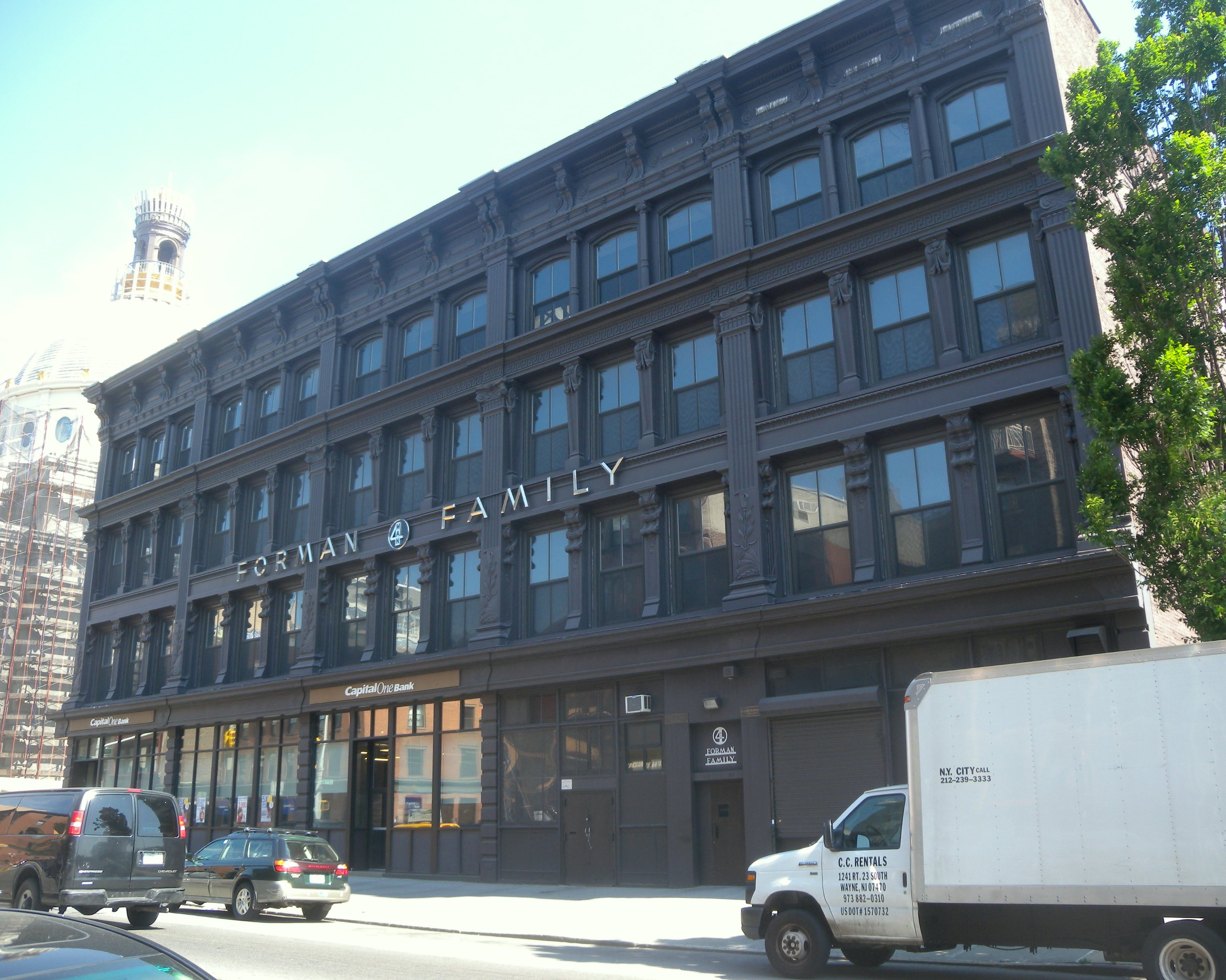
Sparrow Shoe Warehouse

The Broadway Ferry provided service (from the early 19th century) from the foot of Broadway to several points in Manhattan and by the mid-1860s was carrying over 200,000 passengers per day. The ferry terminal was linked first to streetcars and then elevated rapid transit in 1889. With these connections, the central commercial area of Williamsburg began to migrate to Broadway from Grand Street. This was further spurred by the opening of the Williamsburg Bridge although the section of Broadway from the new bridge plaza to the ferry landing river declined since it was now effectively bypassed. Prominent extant buildings in Williamsburg located on Broadway include the Williamsburgh Savings Bank (at #175, built in 1875), Nassau Trust Company (at #134-136, built in 1888), Kings County Savings Bank (#135, built in 1868), Peter Luger Steak House (at 178, built in 1876), and several cast iron buildings such as the Sparrow Shoe Factory (#195, across Driggs Avenue from Williamsburgh Savings, built in 1882).

During the New York City blackout of 1977, Broadway was the epicenter and worst hit of the looting, rioting, and violence that hit the city. Thirty-five blocks of Broadway from Williamsburg to Bedford-Stuyvesant were destroyed, 134 stores looted, 45 of them set ablaze. The riots accelerated white flight from the area, as many of the destroyed properties were never rebuilt and remained empty lots well into the 1980s. Broadway remained a high-crime, destitute area until gentrification in the 2000s which has initiated a resurgence of new businesses, construction of luxury condominiums, and a return of chain stores to the area. In 2019, the New York City Department of City Planning released a Bushwick rezoning plan, which would allow for high-density development on Broadway and Myrtle and Wyckoff Avenues.

== Transportation ==
The Broadway corridor in Brooklyn is served by the following:

- The BMT Jamaica Line (J, M, and Z trains) runs above Broadway between Marcy Avenue and Broadway Junction stations, with the M train diverging at Myrtle Avenue to join the BMT Myrtle Avenue Line.
- The Broadway station at Union Avenue is served by the G train.
- The B46 local runs on Broadway between Malcolm X Boulevard and Williamsburg Bridge Plaza.
- The B32 and Q59 run on the corridor between the Williamsburg Bridge Plaza and either Kent Avenue (to Queens) or Wythe Avenue (from Queens).
- The Q24 runs from Lafayette Avenue to Van Sinderen Avenue (Jamaica) or from Eastern Parkway to Van Buren Street (Bed-Stuy).
- Northbound B15 buses use Broadway from Lewis Avenue to Marcus Garvey Boulevard, to get to Woodhull Hospital.
- The B20 runs from Eastern Parkway to Decatur Street (Ridgewood) or from Schaefer Street to Van Sinderen Avenue (Postal Facility).
- The B47 runs between Ralph Avenue and either Marcus Garvey Boulevard (Bed-Stuy) or Park Avenue (Kings Plaza).
- The B62 runs from Havemeyer Street to Bedford Avenue (Astoria) or from Driggs Avenue to Roebling Street (Downtown Brooklyn).
- The B24 runs between Williamsburg Bridge Plaza and either Rodney Street (Greenpoint) or Marcy Avenue (Williamsburg). The latter is supplemented by the westbound B60 and Q54.
- All B44 buses that run the full route to Williamsburg Bridge Plaza operate east of Roebling Street.
- Broadway Junction-bound B83 and Q56 buses run from Jamaica Avenue to Van Sinderen Avenue, where they terminate.
- Halsey Street splits into two parts at Broadway, requiring the B26 to use it between them.
