= Park Avenue station (BMT Jamaica Line) =

Park Avenue
- Former New York City Subway station

Station statistics
- Address: Park Avenue & Broadway; Brooklyn, NY 11206
- Borough: Brooklyn
- Locale: Bedford-Stuyvesant, Bushwick
- Coordinates: 40°41′56.1″N 73°56′19.4″W
- Division: B (BMT)
- Line: BMT Jamaica Line
- Services: None (demolished)
- Structure: Elevated
- Platforms: 1 island platform
- Tracks: 2

Other information
- Opened: June 25, 1888; 137 years ago
- Closed: June 5, 1916; 109 years ago

Station succession
- Next east: Myrtle Avenue
- Next west: Flushing Avenue
Location

Street map
Station service legend
| Symbol | Description |
| Stops all times | Stops in station at all times |
| Stops all times except late nights | Stops all times except late nights |
| Stops late nights only | Stops late nights only |
| Stops late nights and weekends | Stops late nights and weekends only |
| Stops weekdays during the day | Stops weekdays during the day |
| Stops weekends during the day | Stops weekends during the day |
| Stops all times except rush hours in the peak direction | Stops all times except rush hours in the peak direction |
| Stops all times except weekdays in the peak direction | Stops all times except weekdays in the peak direction |
| Stops daily except rush hours in the peak direction | Stops all times except nights and rush hours in the peak direction |
| Stops rush hours only | Stops rush hours only |
| Stops rush hours in the peak direction only | Stops rush hours in the peak direction only |
| Station closed | Station is closed |
(Details about time periods)

The Park Avenue station was a station on the BMT Jamaica Line located at the intersection of Park Avenue and Broadway in Brooklyn, New York City.

This station opened on June 25, 1888. It closed on June 5, 1916, due to its proximity to stations at Flushing Avenue and Myrtle Avenue, and to allow for the Dual Contracts rebuilding of the Jamaica Line. As part of the rebuilding, the line was given a third track, the remaining stations were given side platforms, a connection to the Myrtle Avenue Elevated was installed and the elevated was strengthened to allow subway cars to use the line.

This elevated station had two tracks and an island platform.
