= Gates Avenue station =

New York City Subway station in Brooklyn

Gates Avenue
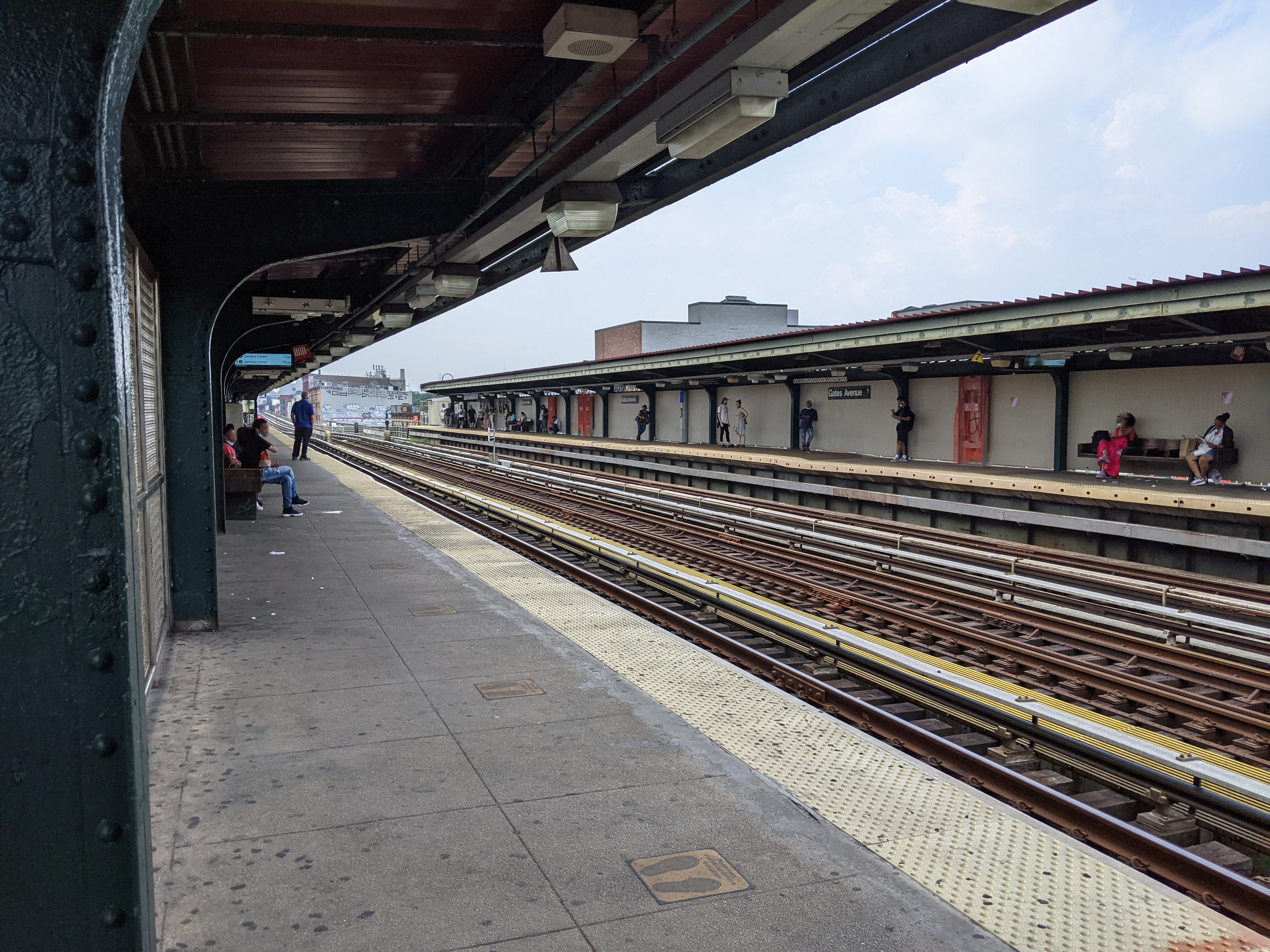
- Northbound platform in 2021

Station statistics
- Address: Gates Avenue and Broadway; Brooklyn, New York
- Borough: Brooklyn
- Locale: Bedford–Stuyvesant, Bushwick
- Coordinates: 40.68949°N 73.922067°W
- Division: B (BMT)
- Line: BMT Jamaica Line; BMT Lexington Avenue Line (formerly)
- Services: J (all except rush hours, peak direction); Z (rush hours, peak direction)
- Transit: NYCT Bus: B47, B52, Q24
- Structure: Elevated
- Platforms: 2 side platforms
- Tracks: 3 (2 in regular service)

Other information
- Opened: May 13, 1885; 141 years ago
- Accessible: No; under construction

Traffic
- 2025: 1,619,347 ▲10.5%
- Rank: 217 out of 423
Services
Preceding station	New York City Subway	Following station
Myrtle Avenue Z skip-stop	J/Z (New York City Subway service)	Chauncey Street Z skip-stop
Kosciuszko Street J toward Broad Street	J/Z (New York City Subway service)	Halsey Street J toward Jamaica Center–York College
Non-revenue services and lines
Preceding station	New York City Subway	Following station
Reid Avenue Lexington Ave; demolished	no service	
Location
Location within New York City Subway
Location within New York City
Location within New York
Track layout
Street map
Station service legend
Symbol	Description
Stops all times except rush hours in the peak direction	Stops all times except rush hours in the peak direction
Stops rush hours in the peak direction only	Stops rush hours in the peak direction only
Stops all times	Stops all times
Stops all times except late nights	Stops all times except late nights

The Gates Avenue station is a local station on the elevated BMT Jamaica Line of the New York City Subway, located at the intersection of Gates Avenue and Broadway at the border of Bedford–Stuyvesant and Bushwick, Brooklyn. It is served by the J train at all times except rush hours in the peak direction, when the Z train takes over service.

== History ==
Gates Avenue is the oldest station in the subway system to have been built as a rapid transit station; it has been serving BMT trains since 1885. While Far Rockaway–Mott Avenue is the oldest station currently in operation in the New York City Subway system, having originally opened in 1869 as a Long Island Rail Road station, that station had an 8-year disruption in service while being converted to subway loading gauge, meaning that Gates Avenue is the system's oldest station in continuous operation.

Gates Avenue was originally opened by the Union Elevated Railroad on May 13, 1885 for the BMT Lexington Avenue Line, and has been in continuous operation since then. The BMT Jamaica Line connected to the station on June 25, 1888. Prior to the Dual Contracts, trains either operated down Broadway to Broadway Ferry (which closed upon the opening of the Williamsburg Bridge tracks to Essex Street) or Lexington Avenue, eventually merging onto the Myrtle Avenue El. The Dual Contracts expanded the BMT Jamaica Line, including Gates Avenue, to three tracks, allowing for express service, as well as expanding service in Manhattan down Nassau Street. On January 27, 1912, a request to improve congestion at Gates Avenue was denied by the BRT; however, "it took a civic worker seven minutes to ascend the stairs leading to the platform during the rush hours". In 1950, the Lexington Avenue El closed, resulting in the redirection of all trains to the Williamsburg Bridge.

In 2024, the MTA announced that the Gates Avenue station would become fully compliant with the Americans with Disabilities Act of 1990 as part of the agency's 2020–2024 Capital Program. The renovation of the station was to be funded by congestion pricing in New York City. Forte Construction Corp. received a $169 million contract to install elevators at Gates Avenue and two other stations in December 2025. The project, which was to begin in late 2026, is to include two elevators and four rebuilt staircases.

== Station layout ==
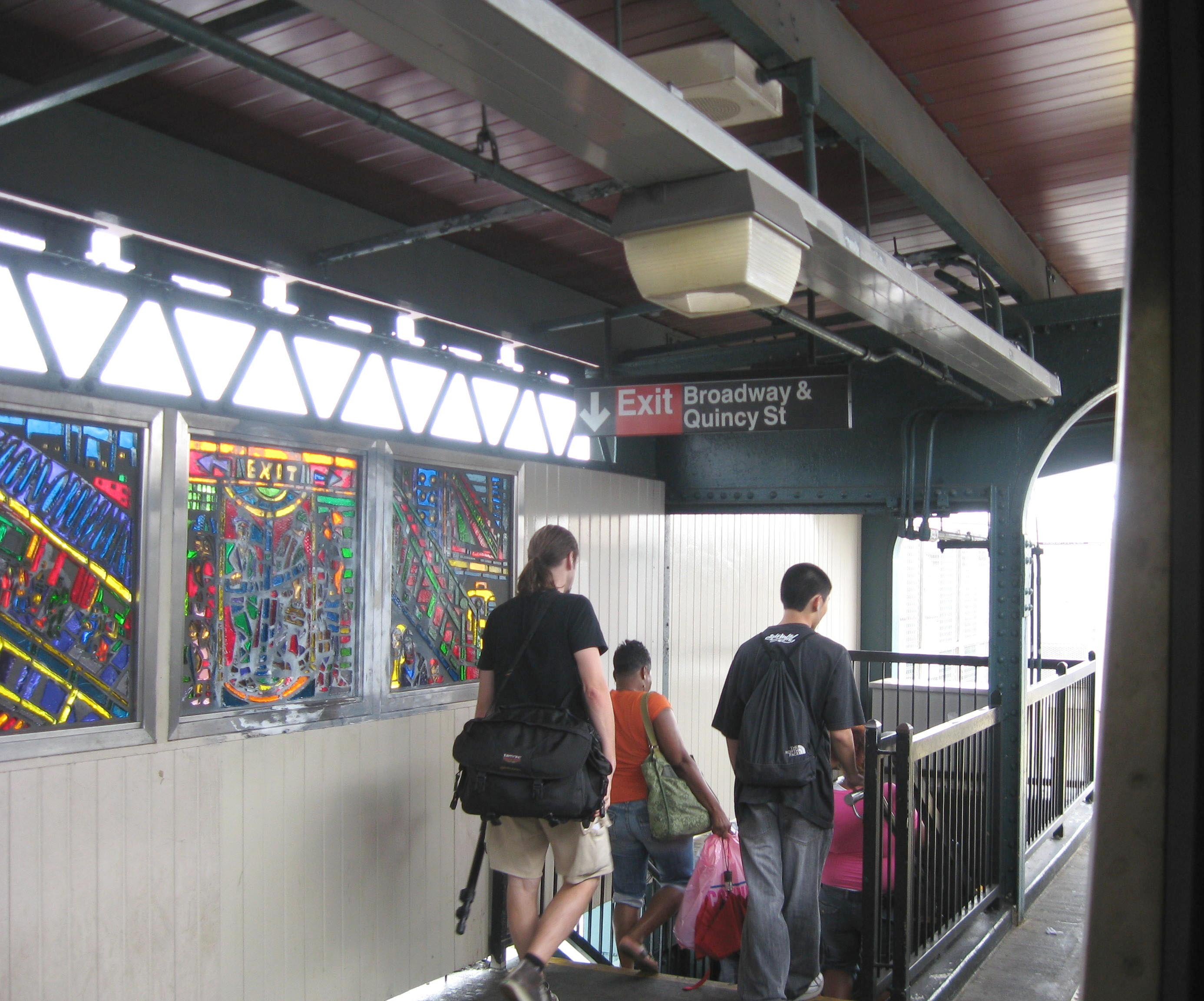
Western exit stair of northbound platform

This station has two side platforms and three tracks with the center express track not normally used. Each platform has beige windscreens and red canopies (both with green frames) that run along the entire length except for a small section at both ends.

The 2002 artwork here is called Dream Train by Chris Robinson and features mass transit-related stained glass windows in the station house and the windscreens.

South of this station, the BMT Jamaica Line connected to the BMT Lexington Avenue Line before it ceased operation on October 13, 1950 and some remains are visible. The next stop on the Lexington Avenue El was Reid Avenue on its way to Downtown Brooklyn and Park Row, Manhattan.

=== Exits ===
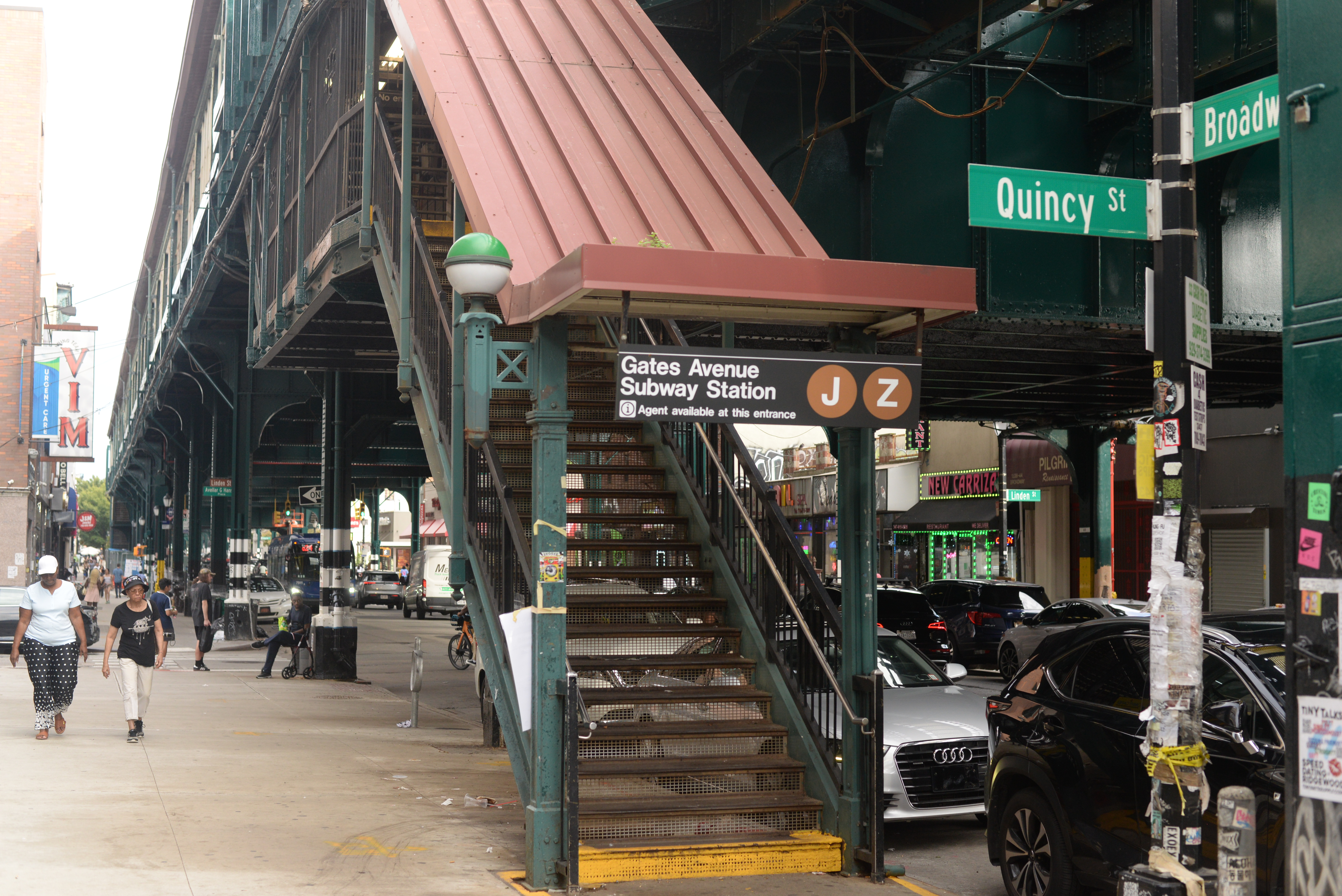
Western stair entrance

The station has exits on both the west (railroad north) end and the east (railroad south) end of its platforms. Despite the station's name, there is no longer an open exit to Gates Avenue.

On the west end, each platform has a single staircase leading to an elevated station house beneath the tracks. It has a turnstile bank and token booth. Outside fare control, two staircases lead to both eastern corners of Quincy Street and Broadway.

The eastern exits are now emergency exits leading to both western corners of Palmetto Street and Broadway, just east of Gates Avenue. These exits were closed in the 1980s due to high crime. There is a closed station house around the intermediate level of the staircases.
