= Driggs Avenue station =

Driggs Avenue
- Former New York City Subway station

Station statistics
- Address: Driggs Avenue and Broadway; Brooklyn, New York 11211
- Borough: Brooklyn
- Locale: Williamsburg
- Coordinates: 40°42′35.65″N 73°57′44.18″W
- Division: B (BMT)
- Line: BMT Jamaica Line
- Services: None (demolished)
- Structure: Elevated
- Platforms: 2 side platforms
- Tracks: 2

Other information
- Opened: June 25, 1888; 138 years ago
- Closed: July 3, 1916; 110 years ago

Station succession
- Next north: Marcy Avenue
- Next south: Broadway Ferry (demolished)
Location

Street map
Station service legend
Symbol	Description
Stops all times	Stops in station at all times
Stops all times except late nights	Stops all times except late nights
Stops late nights only	Stops late nights only
Stops late nights and weekends	Stops late nights and weekends only
Stops weekdays during the day	Stops weekdays during the day
Stops weekends during the day	Stops weekends during the day
Stops all times except rush hours in the peak direction	Stops all times except rush hours in the peak direction
Stops all times except weekdays in the peak direction	Stops all times except weekdays in the peak direction
Stops daily except rush hours in the peak direction	Stops all times except nights and rush hours in the peak direction
Stops rush hours only	Stops rush hours only
Stops rush hours in the peak direction only	Stops rush hours in the peak direction only
Station closed	Station is closed
(Details about time periods)

The Driggs Avenue station was a station on the demolished section of the BMT Jamaica Line in Brooklyn, New York City.

This station was opened on June 25, 1888, as the terminal of the Broadway elevated. When the line was extended to Broadway Ferry on July 14, 1888, this ceased to be the terminal. Mainline BMT Jamaica Line service began providing direct service to Manhattan via the Williamsburg Bridge after 1908. The station finally closed on July 3, 1916, but the segment of the line remained dormant throughout the 1920s and 1930s before being demolished.

This elevated station had two tracks and two side platforms.

The street's name honors Edmund H. Driggs who represented this neighborhood in Congress at the end of the 19th century.
