= Broadway Ferry station =

Coordinates: 40°42′38.81″N 73°58′5.91″W

Broadway Ferry
- Former New York City Subway station

Station statistics
- Borough: Brooklyn
- Locale: Williamsburg
- Division: B (BMT)
- Line: BMT Jamaica Line
- Services: None (demolished)
- Structure: Elevated
- Platforms: 1 island platform
- Tracks: 2

Other information
- Opened: July 14, 1888; 138 years ago
- Closed: July 3, 1916; 110 years ago

Station succession
- Next north: Driggs Avenue (demolished)
- Next south: (Terminus)
Station service legend
Symbol	Description
Stops all times	Stops in station at all times
Stops all times except late nights	Stops all times except late nights
Stops late nights only	Stops late nights only
Stops late nights and weekends	Stops late nights and weekends only
Stops weekdays during the day	Stops weekdays during the day
Stops weekends during the day	Stops weekends during the day
Stops all times except rush hours in the peak direction	Stops all times except rush hours in the peak direction
Stops all times except weekdays in the peak direction	Stops all times except weekdays in the peak direction
Stops daily except rush hours in the peak direction	Stops all times except nights and rush hours in the peak direction
Stops rush hours only	Stops rush hours only
Stops rush hours in the peak direction only	Stops rush hours in the peak direction only
Station closed	Station is closed
(Details about time periods)

The Broadway Ferry station was a station on the demolished section of the BMT Jamaica Line in Brooklyn, New York City.

This station opened on July 14, 1888, to serve the Broadway Ferry, and closed due in part to the mainline BMT Jamaica Line providing direct service to Manhattan via the Williamsburg Bridge after 1908. The station finally closed on July 3, 1916, but the segment of the line remained dormant throughout the 1920s and 1930s.

This elevated station had two tracks and one island platform. A double crossover was located to the east of the station.
