= Brooklyn Elevated Railroad =

Railroad company (1885–1899)

Opening of the Brooklyn Elevated Railroad, May 13th 1885 (Frank Leslie's Illustrated Newspaper, 1885)

The Brooklyn Elevated Railroad was an elevated railroad company in Brooklyn, New York City, United States. It operated from 1885 until 1899, when it was merged into the Brooklyn Rapid Transit Company-controlled Brooklyn Union Elevated Railroad.

== Lines ==
- Lexington Avenue Line, downtown to Cypress Hills
- Myrtle Avenue Line, downtown to Ridgewood, Queens
- Broadway Line, Williamsburg to Cypress Hills
  - via incline and Long Island Rail Road Atlantic Avenue Division to Jamaica, Queens; also via New York and Rockaway Beach Railway to Rockaway Park, Queens
- Fifth Avenue Line, downtown to Bay Ridge
  - via incline and Prospect Park and Coney Island Railroad to Coney Island; also via Long Island Rail Road Bay Ridge Branch and Manhattan Beach Division to Manhattan Beach

== See also ==
- Kings County Elevated Railway, which operated the Fulton Street Line
