= Seneca Avenue station =

New York City Subway station in Queens

Seneca Avenue
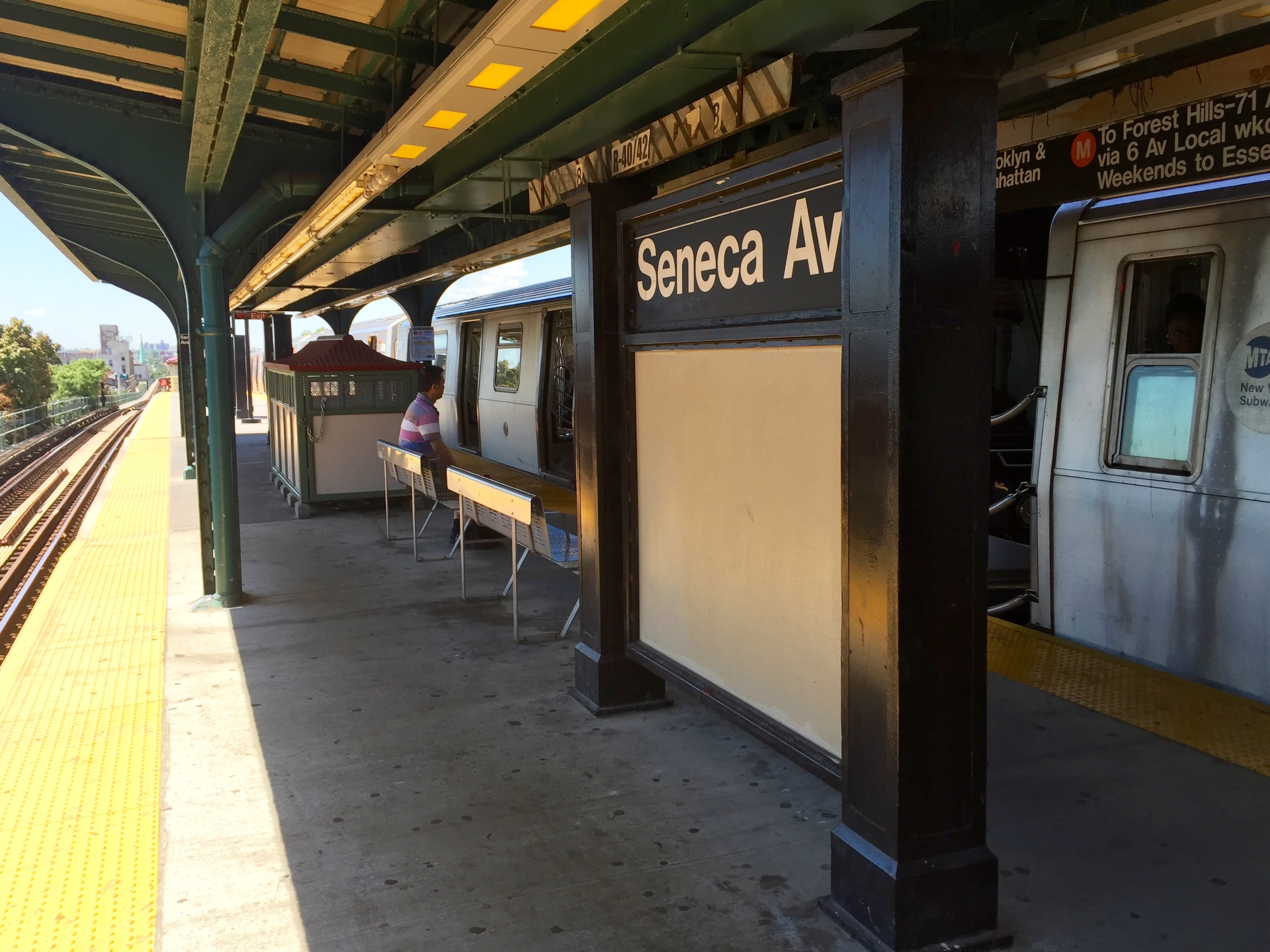

Station statistics
- Address: Seneca Avenue & Palmetto Street; Queens, New York
- Borough: Queens
- Locale: Ridgewood
- Coordinates: 40.702765°N 73.907733°W
- Division: B (BMT)
- Line: BMT Myrtle Avenue Line
- Services: M (all times)
- Transit: NYCT Bus: B13, B38, Q58, Q98
- Structure: Elevated
- Platforms: 1 island platform
- Tracks: 2

Other information
- Opened: February 22, 1915; 111 years ago
- Closed: July 1, 2017; 9 years ago (temporary line closure)
- Reopened: September 1, 2017; 9 years ago

Traffic
- 2025: 672,922 ▲2.8%
- Rank: 358 out of 423
Services
Preceding station	New York City Subway	Following station
Myrtle–Wyckoff Avenues toward Forest Hills–71st Avenue	M (New York City Subway service)	Forest Avenue toward Middle Village–Metropolitan Avenue
Location
Location within New York City Subway
Location within New York City
Location within New York
Track layout
Street map
Station service legend
Symbol	Description
Stops all times	Stops all times

The Seneca Avenue station is a station on the BMT Myrtle Avenue Line of the New York City Subway. Located at the intersection of Palmetto Street and Seneca Avenue in Ridgewood, Queens, it is served by the M train at all times. The station opened in 1915 as part of the Dual Contracts.

== History ==
This station opened on February 22, 1915, by the Brooklyn Rapid Transit Company as part of a project to elevate a portion of the Myrtle Avenue Line, which had run at street level. This work was completed as part of the Dual Contracts.

== Station layout ==
This elevated station has two tracks and an island platform. The platform has a steel canopy supported by black and green columns in the center.

To the northeast (railroad south) of the station, the BMT Myrtle Avenue Line curves east to leave the street grid and continue as an elevated structure over the former grade level steam dummy Lutheran Cemetery Line. Southwest of the station, there is space for a center track.

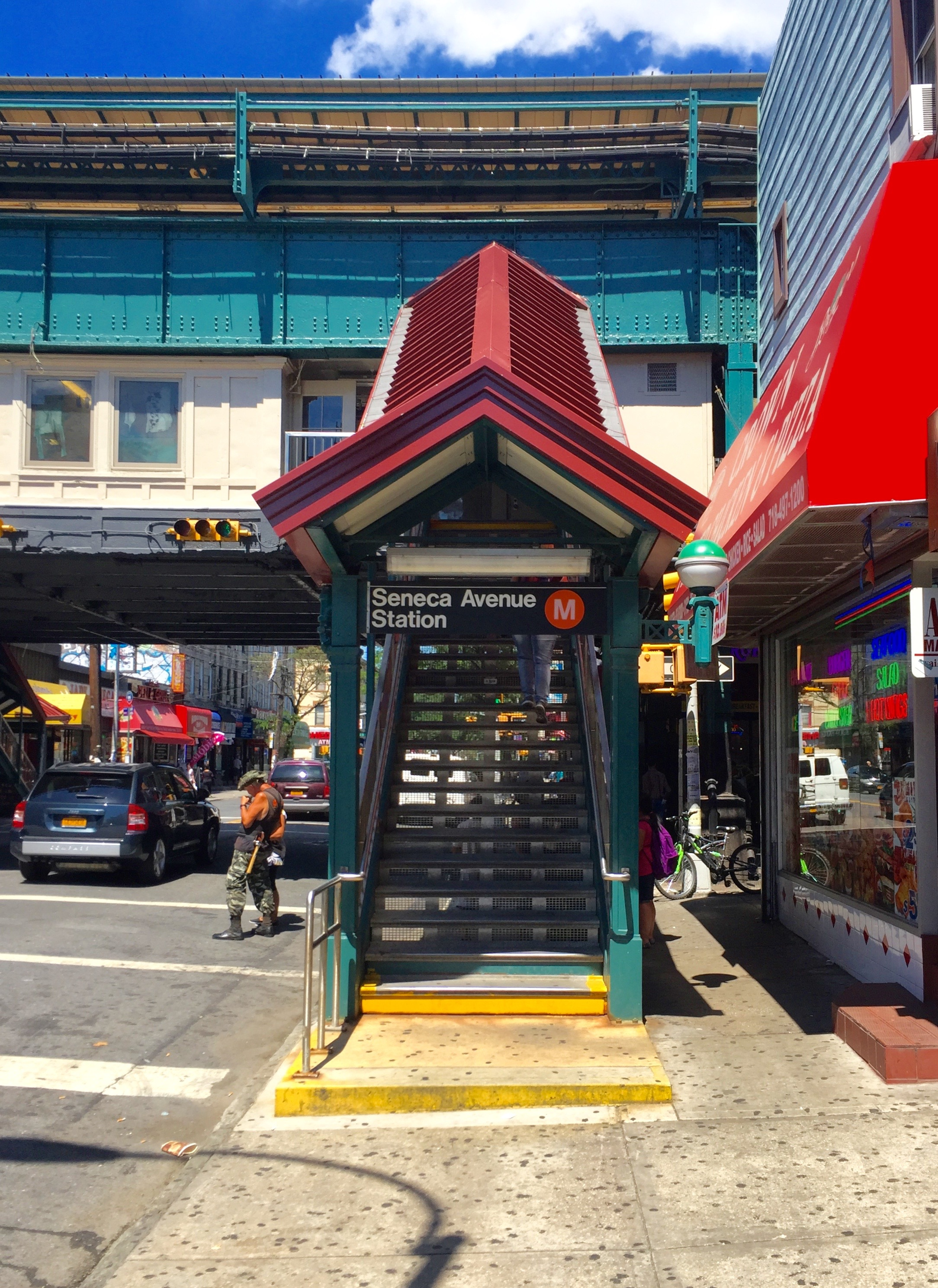
NE corner entrance

=== Exits ===
The station's only entrance/exit is an elevated wooden mezzanine beneath the tracks. It has two staircases to the platform with doors on the landings, turnstile bank, token booth, and two street stairs to the southwest and northeast corners of Palmetto Street and Seneca Avenue.
