= Forest Avenue station =

New York City Subway station in Queens

Forest Avenue
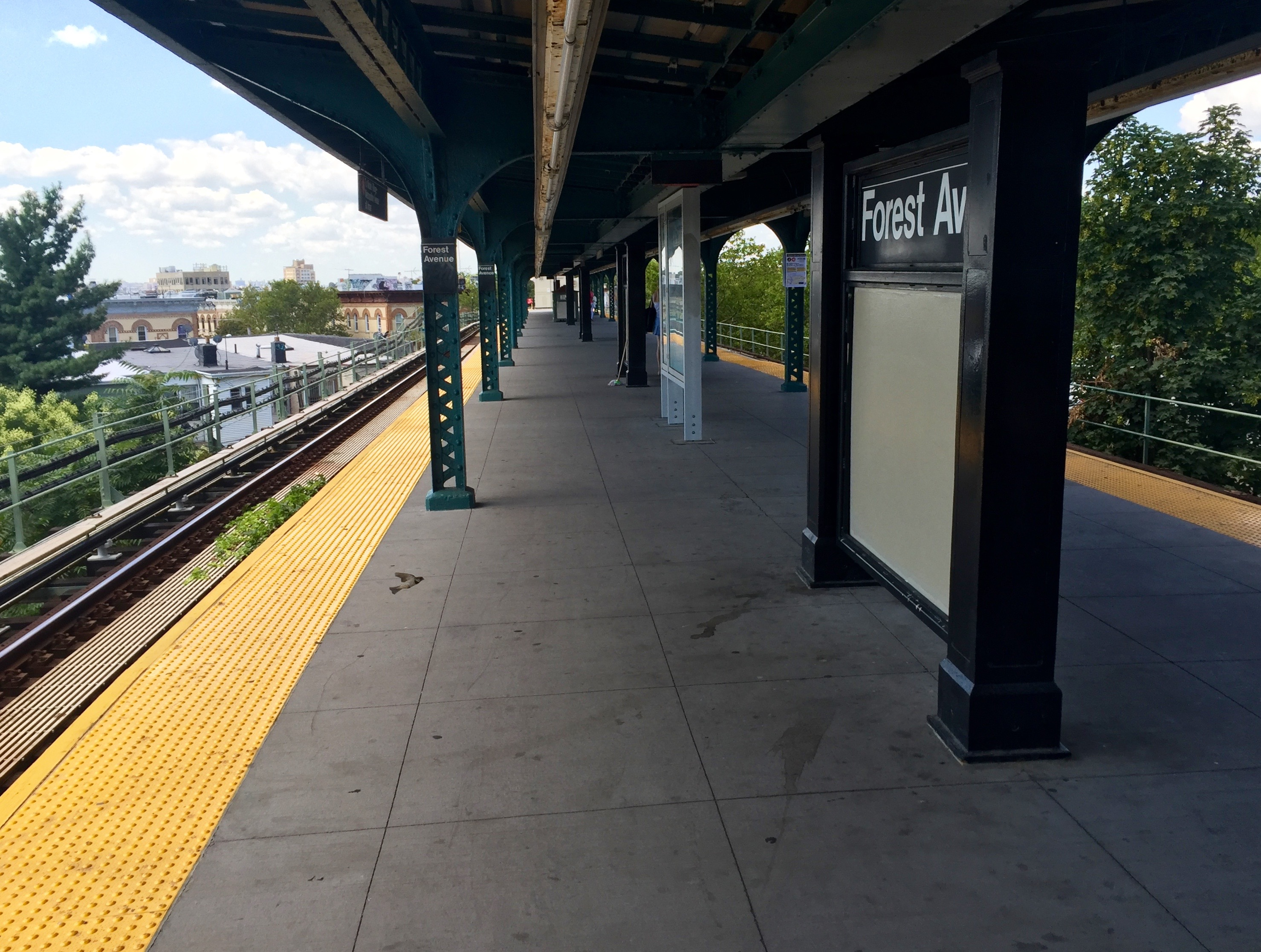

Station statistics
- Address: Forest Avenue & Putnam Avenue; Queens, New York
- Borough: Queens
- Locale: Ridgewood
- Coordinates: 40.704619°N 73.901982°W
- Division: B (BMT)
- Line: BMT Myrtle Avenue Line
- Services: M (all times)
- Transit: NYCT Bus: B13, B20, Q14, Q39, Q58, Q98
- Structure: Elevated
- Platforms: 1 island platform
- Tracks: 2

Other information
- Opened: February 22, 1915; 111 years ago
- Closed: July 1, 2017; 9 years ago (temporary line closure)
- Reopened: September 1, 2017; 9 years ago
- Accessible: No; planned

Traffic
- 2025: 1,037,320 ▲4.2%
- Rank: 304 out of 423
Services
Preceding station	New York City Subway	Following station
Seneca Avenue toward Forest Hills–71st Avenue	M (New York City Subway service)	Fresh Pond Road toward Middle Village–Metropolitan Avenue
Location
Location within New York City Subway
Location within New York City
Location within New York
Track layout
Street map
Station service legend
Symbol	Description
Stops all times	Stops all times

The Forest Avenue station is a station on the BMT Myrtle Avenue Line of the New York City Subway. Located on a private right-of-way in Ridgewood, Queens, the station is served by the M train at all times. The station opened in 1915 as part of the Dual Contracts.

== History ==
This station opened on February 22, 1915 by the Brooklyn Rapid Transit Company as part of a project to elevate a portion of the Myrtle Avenue Line, which had run at street level. This work was completed as part of the Dual Contracts. The Myrtle Avenue Elevated line was already extended to Middle Village nine years earlier. The station was acquired by Brooklyn Manhattan Transit Company in 1923, and later by the New York City Board of Transportation in 1940.

As part of its 2025–2029 Capital Program, the MTA has proposed making the station wheelchair-accessible in compliance with the Americans with Disabilities Act of 1990.

== Station layout ==
This elevated station has two tracks and an island platform. The canopy is metal while the mezzanine under the station is wood.

=== Exits ===
The only open exit is at the east end of the station. Stairs from the platform lead down to a mezzanine below the tracks, from which two stairs lead to the western side of Forest Avenue on opposite sides of the intersection of Fairview and Putnam Avenues. There was also an exit at the west end that led to Woodward Avenue.
