= Queens Boulevard Local =

Queens Boulevard Local is the name of the following subway services in New York City, that run from Forest Hills through Queens Boulevard to Midtown Manhattan:

- M (6th Av/Queens Blvd Local)
- R (Broadway/Queens Blvd Local)
