= Fresh Pond Road station =

New York City Subway station in Queens

Fresh Pond Road
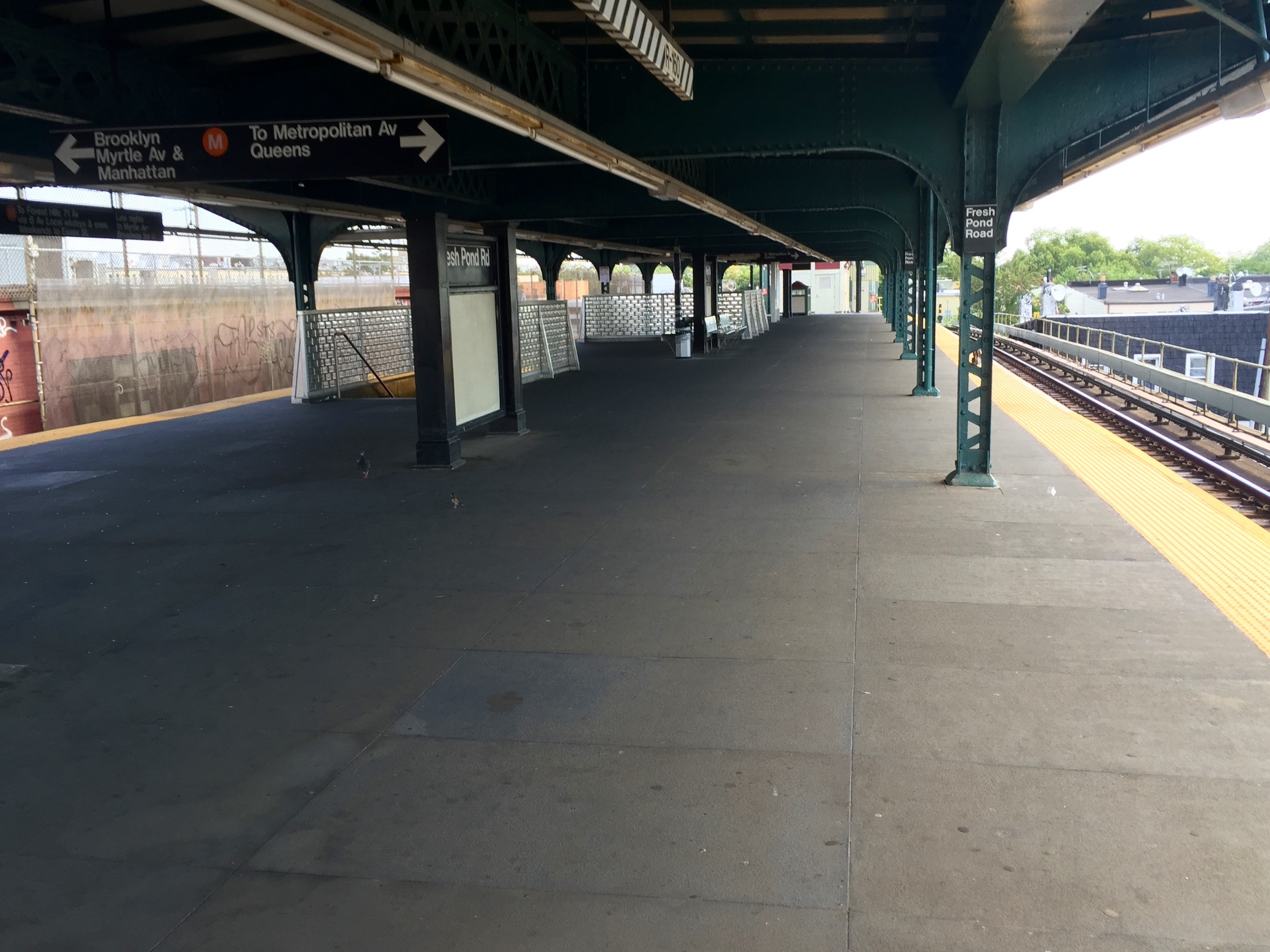

Station statistics
- Address: Fresh Pond Road opposite 67th Avenue; Queens, New York
- Borough: Queens
- Locale: Ridgewood
- Coordinates: 40.705953°N 73.896704°W
- Division: B (BMT)
- Line: BMT Myrtle Avenue Line
- Services: M (all times)
- Transit: NYCT Bus: B13, B20, Q58, Q98; MTA Bus: QM24, QM25, QM34
- Structure: Elevated
- Platforms: 1 island platform
- Tracks: 2

Other information
- Opened: February 22, 1915; 111 years ago
- Closed: July 1, 2017; 9 years ago (temporary line closure)
- Reopened: September 1, 2017; 9 years ago

Traffic
- 2025: 1,306,330 ▲8.3%
- Rank: 260 out of 423
Services
Preceding station	New York City Subway	Following station
Forest Avenue toward Forest Hills–71st Avenue	M (New York City Subway service)	Middle Village–Metropolitan Avenue Terminus
Location
Location within New York City Subway
Location within New York City
Location within New York
Track layout
Street map
Station service legend
Symbol	Description
Stops all times	Stops all times

The Fresh Pond Road station is a station on the BMT Myrtle Avenue Line of the New York City Subway, along Fresh Pond Road between 67th and Putnam Avenues in Ridgewood. The station is served by the M train at all times. The station opened in 1915 as part of the Dual Contracts.

== History ==
This station was opened on February 22, 1915 by the Brooklyn Rapid Transit Company as part of a project to elevate a portion of the Myrtle Avenue Line, which had run at street level. This work was completed as part of the Dual Contracts.

== Station layout ==
This elevated station has two tracks and an island platform. The platform is wider than those in most other stations in the system because the station was formerly a major transfer point to the Flushing–Ridgewood streetcar line to Flushing. This service was replaced by the Q58 bus on July 17, 1949.

A brown canopy with green frames and support columns run along the entire length of the platform except for a small section at the west end (railroad north). Below the station is an MTA-owned lot commonly used for storing buses based out of the adjacent Fresh Pond Bus Depot.

To the east of the station is the Fresh Pond Yard. However, it can only be accessed from Middle Village–Metropolitan Avenue, the next station east (railroad south). Trains heading to the yard from Manhattan and Brooklyn must first enter Metropolitan Avenue, then reverse into the yard.

=== Exits ===
This station has a mezzanine/station house below the platform and tracks near the east (railroad south) end. Two staircases from the platform go down to the waiting area, where a turnstile bank provides access to and from the station. Outside fare control, there is a token booth and two sets of doors.

One set of doors leads to an elevated passageway that turns 90 degrees to a short staircase before a stair goes down to the east side of Fresh Pond Road. The passageway has a high exit-only turnstile with its own staircase from the platform. The station house's other set of doors leads to a staircase that goes down to a passageway on the left and also goes to a disused and usually gated staircase on the right. The passageway heads to a four-step stairway at the dead-end of 62nd Street, north of 68th Avenue, and the staircase comes out just east of the start of the stair to Fresh Pond Road. The Fresh Pond Road entrance used to be a ramp to the mezzanine, but the ramp was removed following a 2010s renovation.

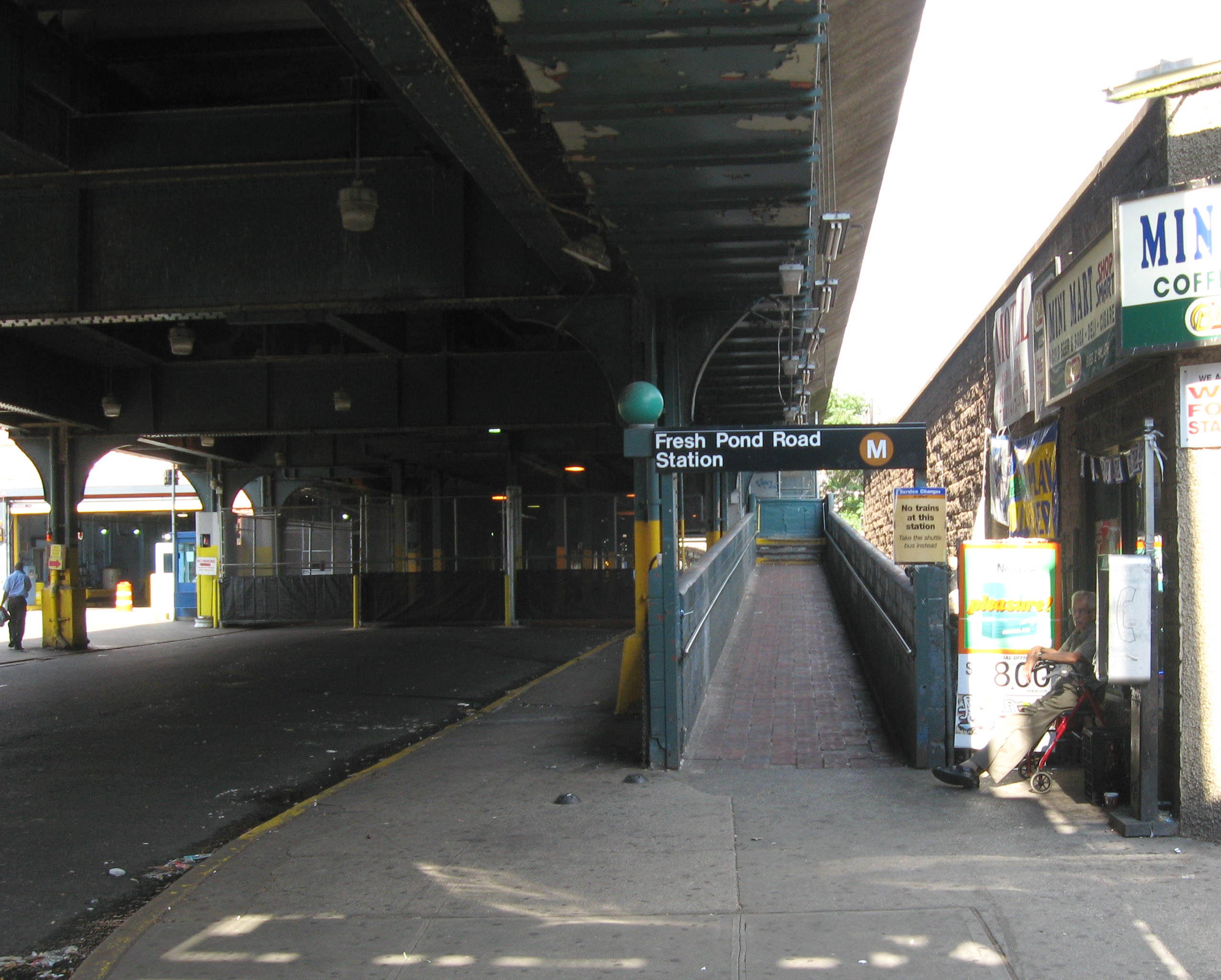
Old entrance ramp

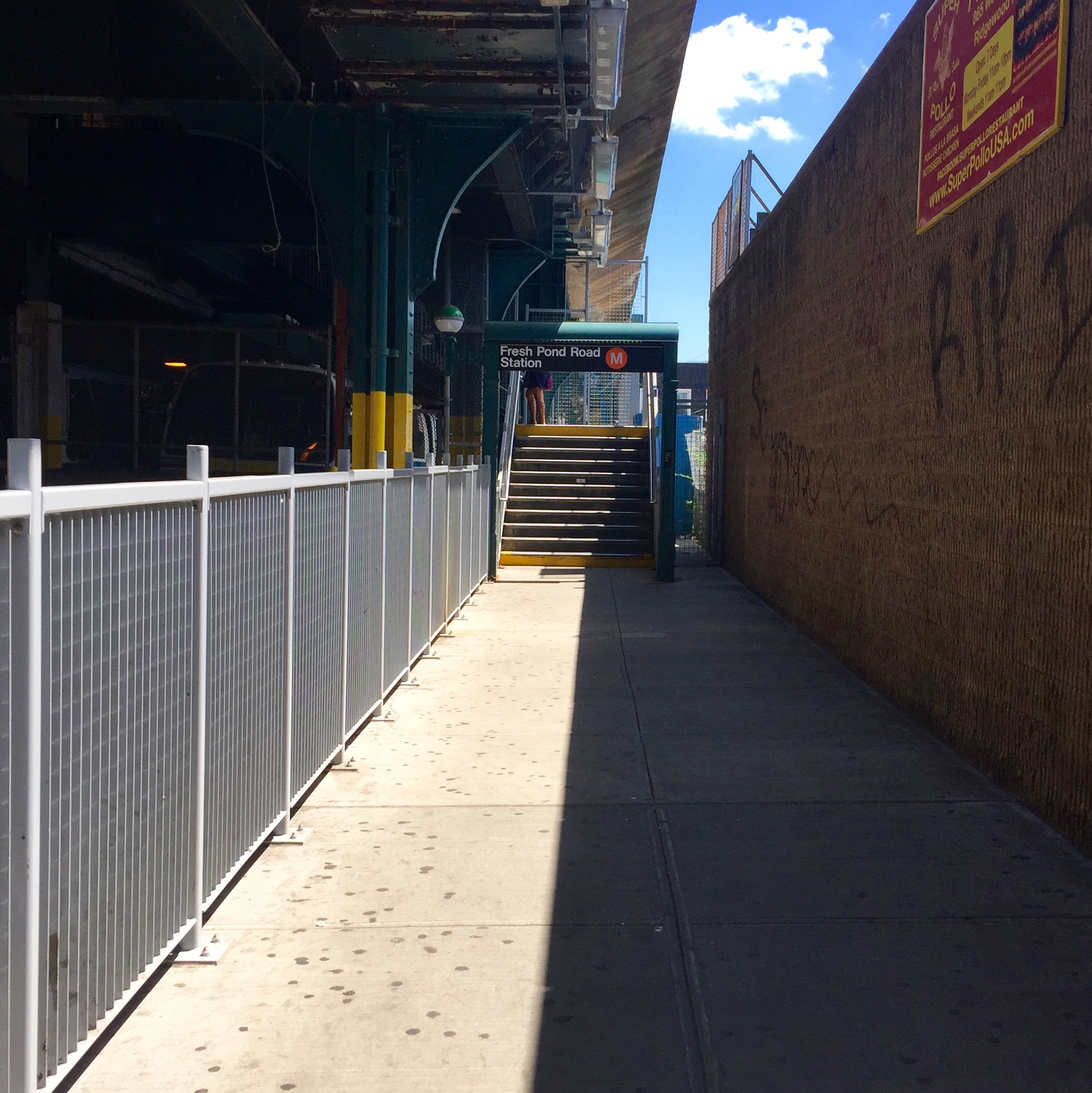
Entrance stair that replaced the ramp
