= M (New York City Subway service) =

Rapid transit service

- Queens Boulevard/ Sixth Avenue/ Myrtle Avenue Local

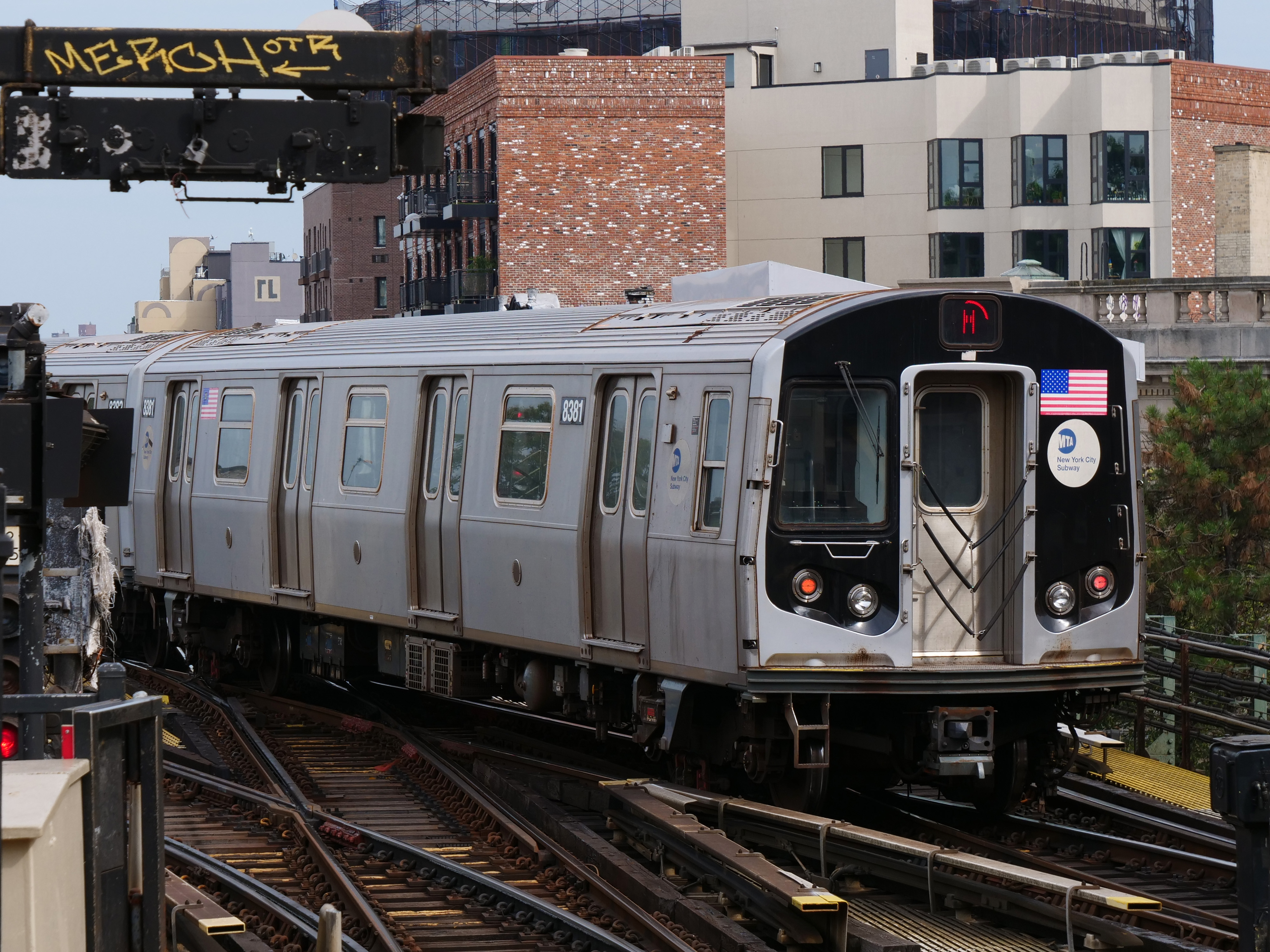
- Middle Village–Metropolitan Avenue-bound M train of R160s leaving Myrtle Avenue

- Northern end: Clockwise direction: Forest Hills–71st Avenue (weekday rush hours and middays); Essex Street (Weekday evenings and weekends except late nights); Myrtle Avenue (late nights)
- Southern end: Counterclockwise direction: Middle Village–Metropolitan Avenue
- Stations: 36; 13 (Weekday evening and weekend non-late night service); 8 (late night service)
- Rolling stock: R160; R179 (Rolling stock assignments subject to change)
- Depot: East New York Yard
- Started service: 1914; 112 years ago
- Discontinued: October 4, 1969; 57 years ago (MJ service only)

The M Queens Boulevard/Sixth Avenue/Myrtle Avenue Local is a rapid transit service in the B Division of the New York City Subway. Its route emblem, or "bullet", is colored orange since it is a part of the IND Sixth Avenue Line in Manhattan.

The M operates 24 hours daily, although service patterns vary based on the time of day. Weekday rush hour and midday service operates between 71st Avenue in Forest Hills and Metropolitan Avenue in Middle Village, Queens and makes all stops along the full route through Manhattan and Brooklyn; weekday evening and weekend non-overnight service short turns at Essex Street on the Lower East Side of Manhattan and does not operate to or from 71st Avenue. Overnight service operates as a shuttle between Metropolitan Avenue in Queens and Myrtle Avenue–Broadway in Brooklyn.

The M is the only service that travels in the same borough via two different and unconnected lines. Additionally, the M is the only non-shuttle service that has both of its full-run terminals in the same borough (Queens). Though the full route length between 71st Avenue and Metropolitan Avenue is about 18.2 miles (29.3 km), the stations are geographically located 2.47 miles (3.98 km) apart, marking this as the shortest geographic distance between termini for any New York City Subway service that is not a shuttle service.

An MJ service ran the entire BMT Myrtle Avenue Line until 1969, when the section west of Broadway in Brooklyn was demolished. Before 2010, the full-length M ran from Middle Village to southern Brooklyn via the BMT Nassau Street Line and Montague Street Tunnel. The M had originally run on the BMT Brighton Line to and from Coney Island–Stillwell Avenue. Beginning in 1986, it used the BMT Fourth Avenue Line and BMT West End Line in Brooklyn, terminating at Ninth Avenue or Bay Parkway.

== History ==
=== M service ===
==== 1914–1960 ====
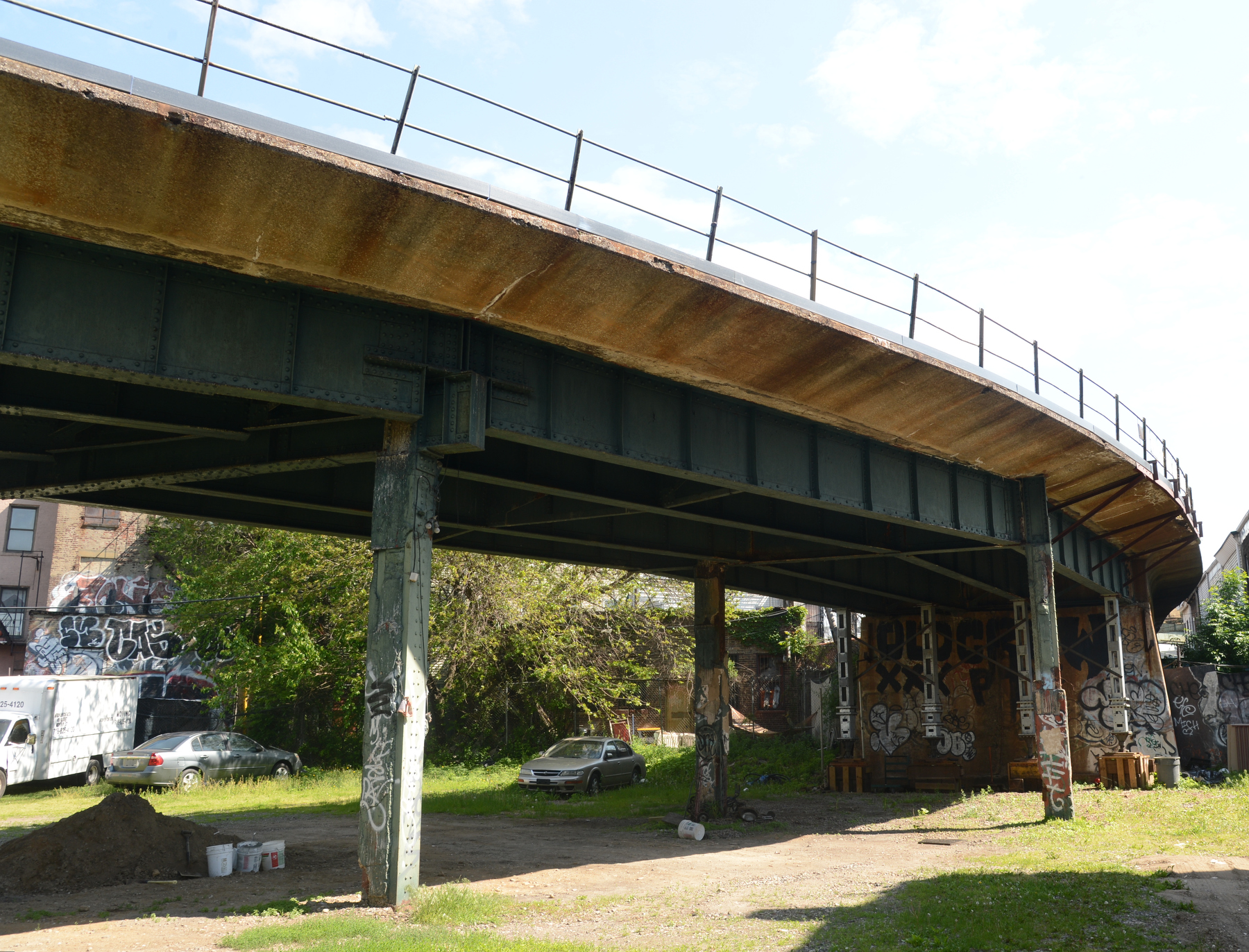
The Myrtle Avenue–Chambers Street Line (later the 10, then the M train) used the Myrtle Viaduct (pictured) along its route between Manhattan and Middle Village

Until 1914, the only service on the Myrtle Avenue Line east of Grand Avenue was a local service between Park Row (via the Brooklyn Bridge) and Middle Village (numbered 11 in 1924). The Myrtle Viaduct, a two-track ramp connecting the Myrtle Avenue Line with the BMT Broadway Elevated (now the Jamaica) Line at the Myrtle Avenue station was opened on July 29, 1914, allowing for a second service, the daytime Myrtle Avenue–Chambers Street Line, or Myrtle-Chambers Line, which ran along the Broadway elevated and the Williamsburg Bridge to Chambers Street on the Nassau Street Loop in Lower Manhattan.

Following the completion of a third track along the Broadway Elevated between Marcy Avenue and Myrtle Avenue on January 17, 1916, these trains began running express on the Broadway Elevated during the evening rush hour in the peak-direction. By 1920, trains later began running express in the morning rush hour and on Saturday afternoon in the peak direction. The number 10 was assigned to the service in 1924. At the time, service ran on weekdays between 6 a.m. and 8 p.m., on Saturdays from 6 a.m. and 9 p.m., and on Sundays from 12:30 to 11 p.m. In the morning rush hour, trains ran express between Central Avenue and Essex Street, and during the evening rush hour, trains ran express between Bowery and Broadway–Myrtle Avenue.

Sunday service was removed in June 1933. All Saturday trains began running local on June 28, 1952. On February 10, 1958, the four rush hour Brighton-Nassau special trains began stopping at Neck Road and Avenue U. In addition, the evening rush hour trains began stopping at DeKalb Avenue, as had been done by morning rush hour trains. On June 28, 1958, Saturday service was discontinued. On May 26, 1959, midday service was eliminated, making the Myrtle-Chambers Line rush-hours only. Service had previously operated on weekdays from 6 a.m. to 8 p.m. Beginning on February 23, 1960, express trains began stopping at Marcy Avenue, which was originally a local stop.

==== 1961–1978 ====
In 1961, with the arrival of new R27s which featured rollsigns with new lettered designations for the BMT's numbered services, the 10 was renamed the M. Since these cars were not assigned to the route, it remained signed as 10. However, the rush hour Nassau Street specials on the BMT Brighton Line and BMT Fourth Avenue Line were signed using the M designation. The line was officially designated "M" after the Chrystie Street changeover on November 27, 1967.

The second half of the Chrystie Street Connection opened on July 1, 1968, and the JJ, which had run along Nassau Street to Broad Street, was relocated through the new connection to the IND Sixth Avenue Line (and renamed the KK). To augment QJ service to Broad Street, the M was extended two stations, from Chambers Street to Broad Street.

On October 4, 1969, the Myrtle Avenue Elevated was discontinued south of Myrtle Avenue to Jay Street. To make up for the loss of MJ service, M service was expanded to run during middays, operating weekdays between 6 a.m. and 7 p.m., and a new SS shuttle began running between Myrtle Avenue and Metropolitan Avenue at other times. In August 1972, the off-hour SS shuttle was renamed as part of the M.

Effective January 2, 1973, the daytime QJ was truncated to Broad Street as the J, and the M was extended beyond Broad Street during the day along the QJ's former route to Coney Island–Stillwell Avenue, via the Montague Street Tunnel and Brighton Line local tracks. With the extension of the M onto the Brighton Line, there were also changes to D service. Northbound weekday M train service originating at Kings Highway would begin at 5:46 a.m., while northbound service from Coney Island would begin at 6:34 a.m. From 5:40 to 6:34 a.m. northbound D trains would run local from Brighton Beach to Kings Highway, and then run express to Prospect Park. Late morning and early afternoon D trains would from then on run express from Brighton Beach to Kings Highway. The span of D express service to Brighton Beach was extended by 45 minutes to 9:05 p.m. from Prospect Park, and the span of M service from Broad Street to Coney Island was extended by 45 minutes from the previous span of QJ service to cover local stops. Two M trains began service at Brighton Beach in the morning rush hour, and in the early morning, three M trains entered service at Brighton Beach, and six entered service at Kings Highway. In addition, the final nine southbound M trains of the evening terminated at Brighton Beach. On May 13, 1974, two of the three northbound early morning trains that were placed into service at Brighton Beach were moved to enter service at Kings Highway.

The local K (renamed from KK in 1973) was eliminated on August 27, 1976, and M express service between Myrtle Avenue and Marcy Avenue ended.

On December 3, 1979, four northbound weekday morning rush hour trains that had been put into service at Kings Highway began service at Brighton Beach.

==== 1986–2004 ====
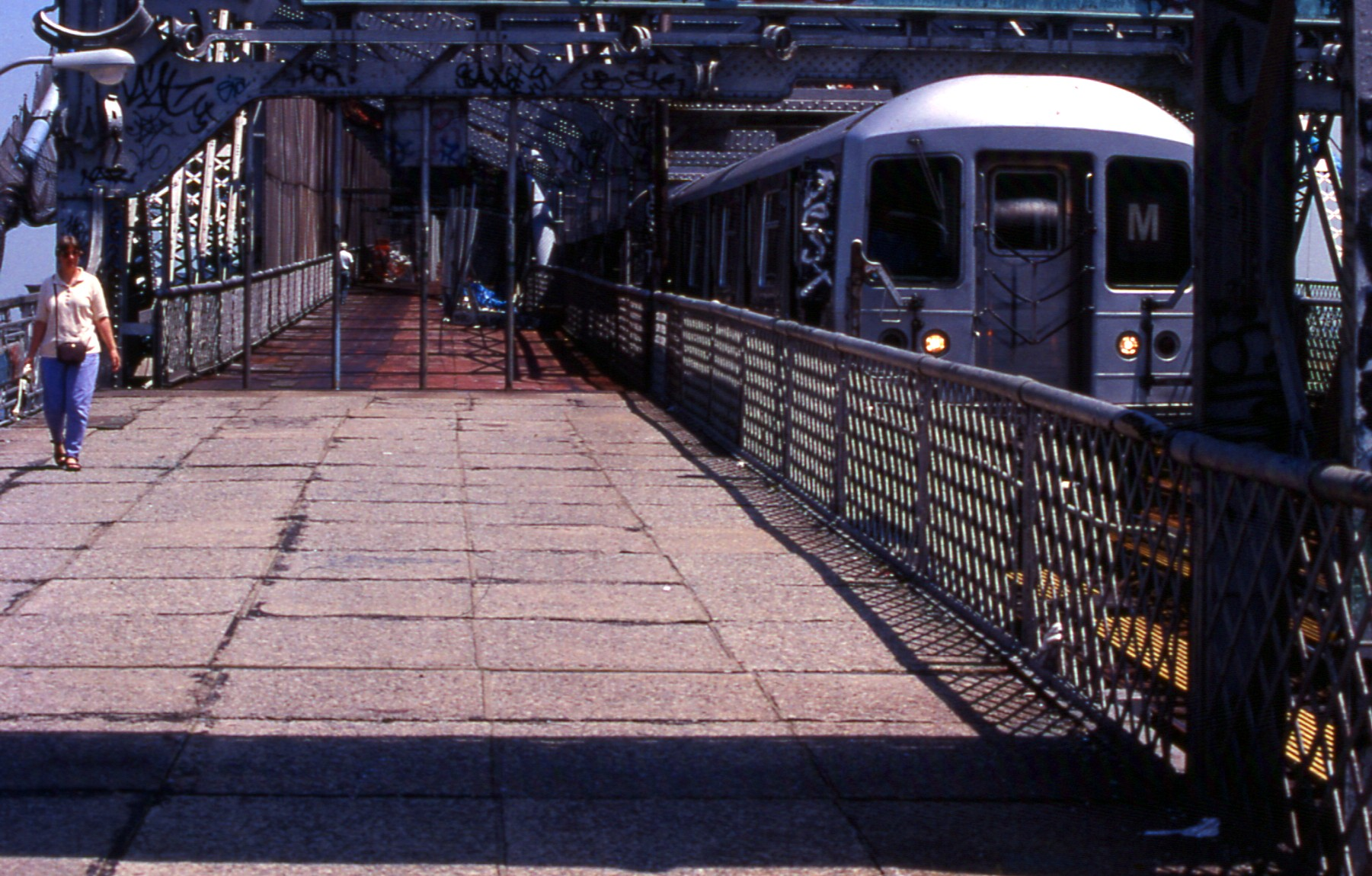
M train of R42s crossing the Williamsburg Bridge in 1995

A six-month reconstruction project on the Brighton Line began on April 26, 1986, and to reduce congestion and delays, weekday daytime M service was shifted to the Fourth Avenue Line's express tracks south of DeKalb Avenue and the BMT West End Line. Service began terminating at Ninth Avenue during middays, and at Bay Parkway during rush hours. This service duplicated a pattern that had last been operated as the TT until late 1967. Manhattan-bound M trains operated from Bay Parkway between about 7:00 and 8:20 a.m., operating every 12 to 15 minutes. Bay Parkway-bound M trains left Chambers Street between 4:20 and 5:30 p.m. In 1991, M trains began running with fewer cars at all times except weekdays from 6 a.m. to 8 p.m. in order to increase passenger security during overnight hours.

M service along Fourth Avenue, operating between 6:30 a.m. and 8:00 p.m., was switched to the local tracks on May 31, 1994, switching with the N, which had run local since the M was moved in 1987. The change was implemented on a six-month trial, and was made permanent afterwards. This change was made as part of New York City Transit's Fare Deal, which sought to increase transit ridership by improving service. The change was proposed in November 1993, and public hearings on the change were held. The change reduced travel times by 4 1/2 minutes for 26,000 people, a majority of the riders on the corridor. As a result of the change, some riders shifted from using stations on the BMT West End Line to the BMT Sea Beach Line, and from Fourth Avenue local stops to Fourth Avenue express stops. Market research found that 44% of M riders felt that crowding decreased, that 35% of M and 30% of N riders used their service more frequently, that 58% of riders thought the change was a good idea, and that only riders at the 45th Street and 53rd Street stations, which received less frequent service, viewed the changes negatively. This change increased operating costs by $245,000.

The midday M (between 9:30 a.m. and 3:30 p.m.) was temporarily truncated to Chambers Street on April 30, 1995, from Ninth Avenue in Brooklyn due to the closure of the Manhattan Bridge during weekday middays for structural repairs. The change was made to provide capacity in the Montague Street Tunnel for the Q, which was rerouted from the Manhattan Bridge. To replace M local service in Brooklyn, midday N trains began making local stops in Brooklyn. In addition, the span of M service to Brooklyn was reduced by fifteen minutes in the early morning and in the late evening by 25 minutes.

The elimination of midday service to Brooklyn was made permanent on November 12, 1995, after the six-month repair project was completed, as part of a series of service cuts made by New York City Transit to make up a shortfall in its budget. It had been expecting a $160 million surplus in 1995, but due to reductions in state and federal contributions, it was left with a deficit which could reach $172 million. The elimination of midday M service to Brooklyn was part of a larger plan to reduce spending in order to avert a fare increase, which Governor George Pataki and Mayor Rudy Giuliani had pressured the MTA to avoid. Only 4,200 riders used M service to Brooklyn during middays, with fewer than 20 passengers per car, or 80 passengers per train (the M used four-car trains during middays). Because of the low cost effectiveness of operating service to Brooklyn and because of the existence of alternate service on the N and R, it was decided to cut the service. This service cut saved $664,000 annually. Three alternative operating plans were considered: maintaining existing midday service, terminating midday service at Broad Street, and operating service as a shuttle like weekend and late night service. It was decided not to terminate service at Broad Street because it negated a large portion of the crew savings due to the need for personnel to relay trains at the Broad Street terminal, longer running times, and because it had the potential to delay J service, which already terminated there. The shuttle option was dismissed because it would inconvenience a far larger number of M riders. Truncation of midday M service was proposed as early as January 1991 for an October implementation of that year, subject to approval from the MTA board.

From May 1 to September 1, 1999, the Williamsburg Bridge subway tracks were closed for reconstruction, splitting M service in two sections. One service ran at all times between Middle Village–Metropolitan Avenue and Marcy Avenue. The other ran rush hours only between Bay Parkway and Chambers Street. A shuttle provided service on the BMT Nassau Street Line. Fares on the B39 bus crossing the Williamsburg Bridge were eliminated and free subway-bus transfers were given at Marcy Avenue and at Delancey Street. The closure was anticipated to last until October 1999, but subway service was restored one month ahead of schedule. The project cost $130 million, including replacing the tracks' support structure, signal systems and other equipment.

From July 23, 2001, to February 22, 2004, the closure of the north tracks on the Manhattan Bridge resulted in a midday extension back to Ninth Avenue, as well as an extension of the times that the rush hour service was provided to 10 p.m. This change preserved service between the West End Line and Chinatown for passengers that would have taken the B to Grand Street. When full Manhattan Bridge service was restored, midday M service was cut back to Chambers Street and replaced in south Brooklyn by the D. Neighborhood leaders in Chinatown were angered by the decision to terminate midday at Ninth Avenue, instead of running it to Bay Parkway. A spokesman for New York City Transit stated that it was easier to terminate trains at Ninth Avenue and that a signal upgrade project was going on further down the line. In addition, the temporary midday service to Brooklyn was lightly used, with an average of 50 to 60 riders per train during middays going to Brooklyn, and fewer than 50 riders per train during evenings going to Brooklyn.

After the September 11, 2001 attacks, M service initially operated as a shuttle between Metropolitan Avenue and Myrtle Avenue–Broadway. On September 17, M service was rerouted via the Sea Beach Line and originated and terminated at Stillwell Avenue to replace the N, which got suspended; service via the West End Line continued to be provided by W trains. M trains made all stops along the reroute. Normal M service was restored on October 28.

==== 2007–2010 ====
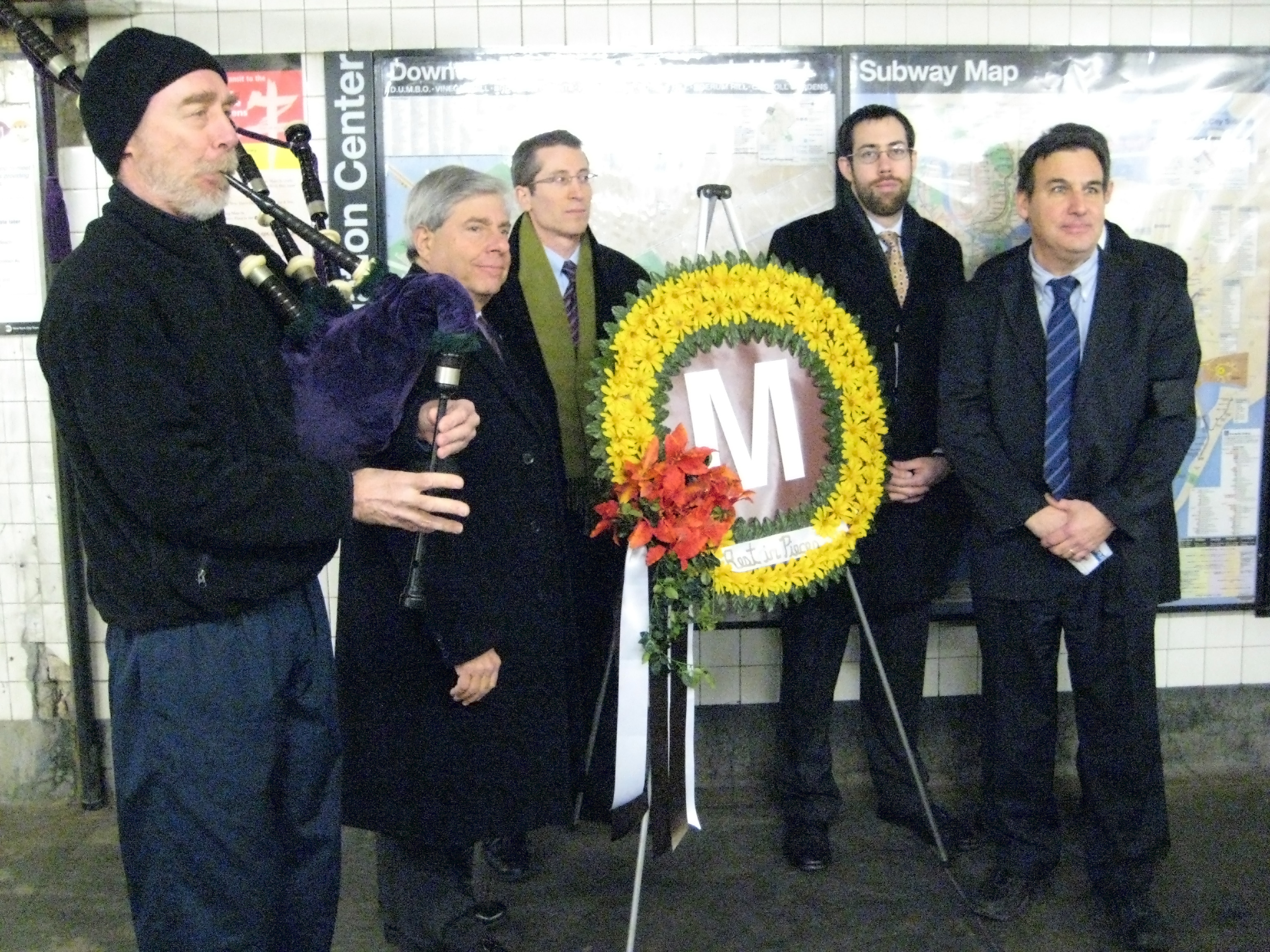
Brooklyn politicians eulogize the "death" of the Nassau Street Line M

In December 2007, the MTA announced that it planned to set aside $27 million in 2008 and $60 million annually afterwards for service enhancements to help riders deal with increased fares. Extended weekday evening M service to Broad Street and weekend service to Chambers Street were part of the plan. However, on March 24, 2008, it was announced that because the agency received substantially less revenue from taxes on real estate transactions, the enhancements were reduced to $4.5 million in 2008 and $8.9 million annually afterwards. The plan to extend weekend service to Chambers Street was dropped. After several months' delay, weekday evening trains were extended to Broad Street on July 27, 2008.

On November 20, 2008, in light of severe budget woes, the MTA announced a slew of potential service cuts; among them was the potential elimination of rush-hour M service which had extended beyond Chambers Street on the Nassau Street Line in Lower Manhattan to Bay Parkway on the West End Line in Brooklyn. In May 2009, after the New York State Legislature passed legislation to offer financial support to the MTA, the service cut was taken off the table. However, in late 2009, the MTA once again discovered that it was confronting another financial crisis; most of the same service cuts threatened just months earlier were revisited. One proposal included completely phasing out M service and using the V as its replacement. Under this proposal, the V would no longer serve its southern terminus at Second Avenue. Instead, after leaving Broadway–Lafayette Street, it would run along the Chrystie Street–Williamsburg Bridge connection, unused since the elimination of the K in 1976, and stop at the upper (BMT) level of Essex Street in Manhattan before serving all M stations to Metropolitan Avenue in Queens.

The MTA determined that this move, while still a service cut, would actually benefit M riders in northern Brooklyn; approximately 17,000 weekday riders used that route to reach its stations in Lower Manhattan, whereas 22,000 transferred to other routes to reach destinations in Midtown Manhattan. However, only about 10,000 riders in Southern Brooklyn used the M to access the Nassau Street Line. This merger opened up new travel options for northern Brooklyn and Queens in that it allowed direct and more convenient access to areas that were not previously served by those routes such as Midtown Manhattan, as before the service changes, M train passengers had to transfer at least once if heading to Midtown.

On March 19, 2010, it was reported that the plan had been changed and that the new combined service would instead carry the M train designation, recolored orange to designate the IND Sixth Avenue Line as its Manhattan trunk line, while discontinuing the V train. Many MTA board members opposed the elimination of the M designation, saying that riders would be more comfortable with that rather than a V designation, and because the M had been around longer than the V. The last M trains to Bay Parkway ran on June 25, 2010, and M service via the Chrystie Street Connection began the following Monday, June 28, 2010.

==== 2011–present ====
On June 8, 2014, weekend daytime M service was extended to Essex Street as part of an $18 million funding project to improve subway service, as well as to offer a direct connection to the F train on Saturdays and Sundays. Late night service continues to terminate at Myrtle Avenue.

During the morning rush hour, the M is at 90 percent of the New York City Subway's capacity guidelines. Ridership on the M has been growing very rapidly since the 2010 service change, and this trend is expected to continue. In June 2016, the frequencies of service on the M route during peak hours were increased, with the expectation that peak train frequencies would be raised again in the future.

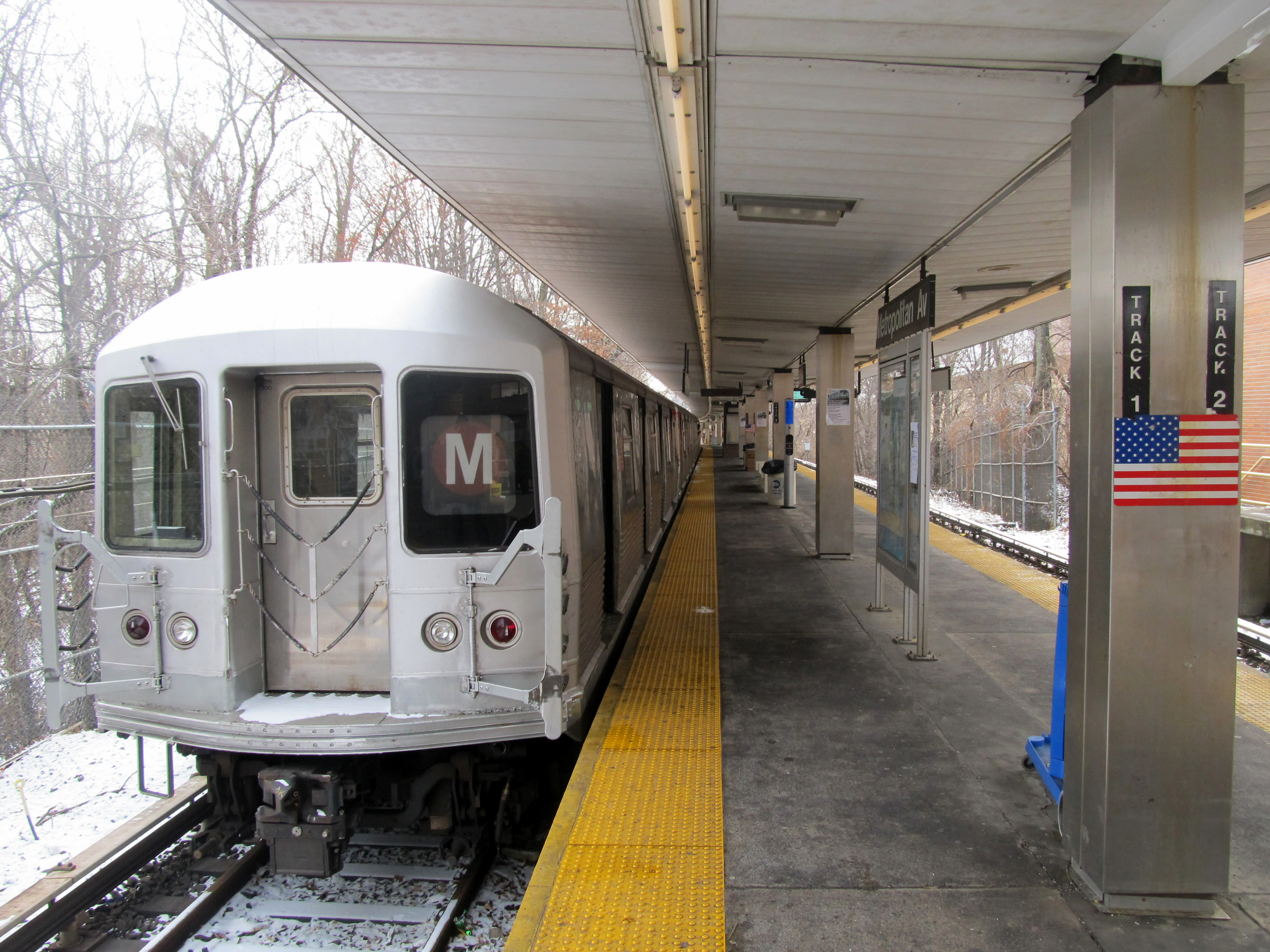
An M shuttle train at Middle Village–Metropolitan Avenue during reconstruction of the Myrtle Avenue Line's junction with the BMT Jamaica Line

From July 1, 2017, to April 30, 2018, reconstruction of two sections of the BMT Myrtle Avenue Line—the approaches to the line's junction with the BMT Jamaica Line and Fresh Pond Bridge over the Long Island Rail Road's Montauk Branch in Queens—required a reroute of M service. Trains to and from Manhattan and Queens, instead of diverging at Myrtle Avenue to go to Metropolitan Avenue, continued east on the BMT Jamaica Line and terminated at Broadway Junction at all times except late nights, when service was suspended. A limited amount of rush hour trains ran between 71st Avenue in Queens and Second Avenue in Manhattan, replicating the V train's routing prior to its discontinuation in 2010. Three shuttle bus routes ran during reconstruction of the Fresh Pond Bridge: one between Myrtle Avenue and Fresh Pond Road; the second between Myrtle and Metropolitan Avenues, skipping the Fresh Pond Road station during the daytime hours; and the third between Flushing Avenue/Broadway and Middle Village–Metropolitan Avenue, stopping at Flushing and Wyckoff Avenues for a transfer to the BMT Canarsie Line at Jefferson Street.

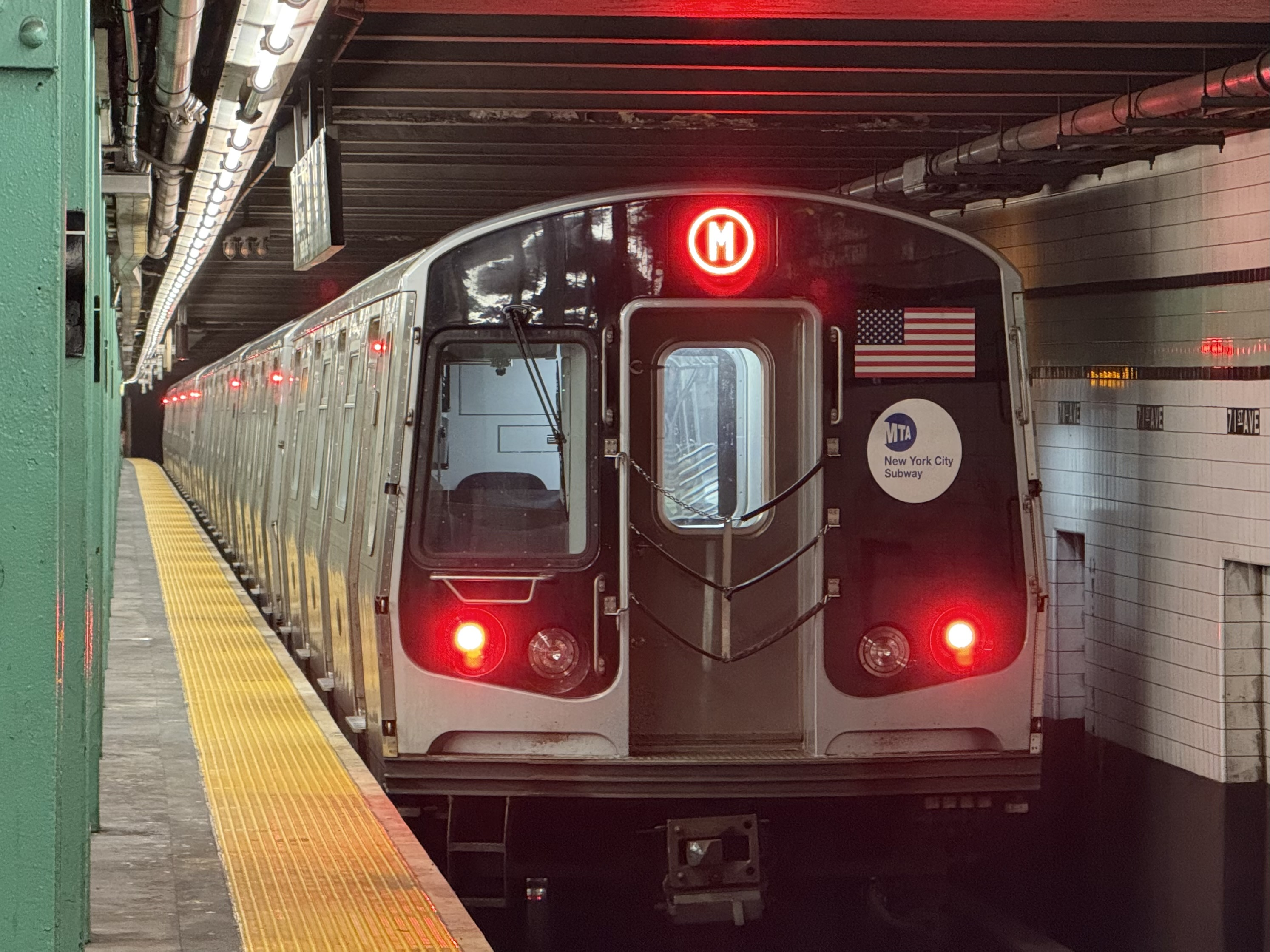
An M train of R179s at Forest Hills–71st Avenue

When the Fresh Pond Bridge project was completed on September 2, 2017, two six-car shuttle trains began operating between Metropolitan and Wyckoff Avenues at all times, running separately from each other on each of the two tracks; two additional six-car trains were stored in the Fresh Pond Yard in order to swap consists in and out of service. These shuttles, along with a shuttle bus route that provided service between Wyckoff Avenue and Broadway, ran until April 27, 2018.

When the 14th Street Tunnel shutdown started in April 2019, weekend and weekday evening M service (from 11:00 p.m. to 1:15 a.m.) was extended from Essex Street to 96th Street on the Second Avenue Subway in Manhattan, via 63rd Street, to compensate for limited L service between Brooklyn and Manhattan. The M had to run to 96th Street because of capacity reductions on the Queens Boulevard Line due to ongoing weekend construction. Both weekday and weekend M frequencies were also increased. This extra service was discontinued after completion of tunnel construction on April 27, 2020. Weekday evening service after 9:15 p.m. was also indefinitely cut back from Forest Hills to Essex Street to accommodate maintenance work for the installation of communications-based train control on the Queens Boulevard Line, Eighth Avenue Line, and Sixth Avenue Line.

Weekend frequencies on the M route were increased in July 2023. Starting August 28, 2023, weekday M trains were truncated to 57th Street in Manhattan, and F trains were rerouted via the 53rd Street Tunnel between Queens and Manhattan, due to track replacement and other repairs in the 63rd Street Tunnel. Weekend M service continued to terminate at Essex Street. Service to Forest Hills resumed on April 1, 2024.

In June 2025, internal MTA documents were leaked, indicating that a proposal to reroute M trains through the 63rd Street Tunnel and reroute F trains through the 53rd Street Tunnel would be presented for approval. The route swap was anticipated to reduce overcrowding at 63rd Street line stations, as well as reduce reliance on interlockings west of the 36th Street station in Queens. In September 2025, the MTA confirmed that the F and M trains would swap routings on weekdays starting on December 8, 2025, with the F running via 53rd Street and the M running via 63rd Street. Service on the M route would also be increased during rush hours to provide additional service along the 63rd Street Line, since M trains ran less frequently than F trains. During its first six months, the swap resulted in slight decreases in end-to-end running times on the F and M routes.

=== MJ service ===
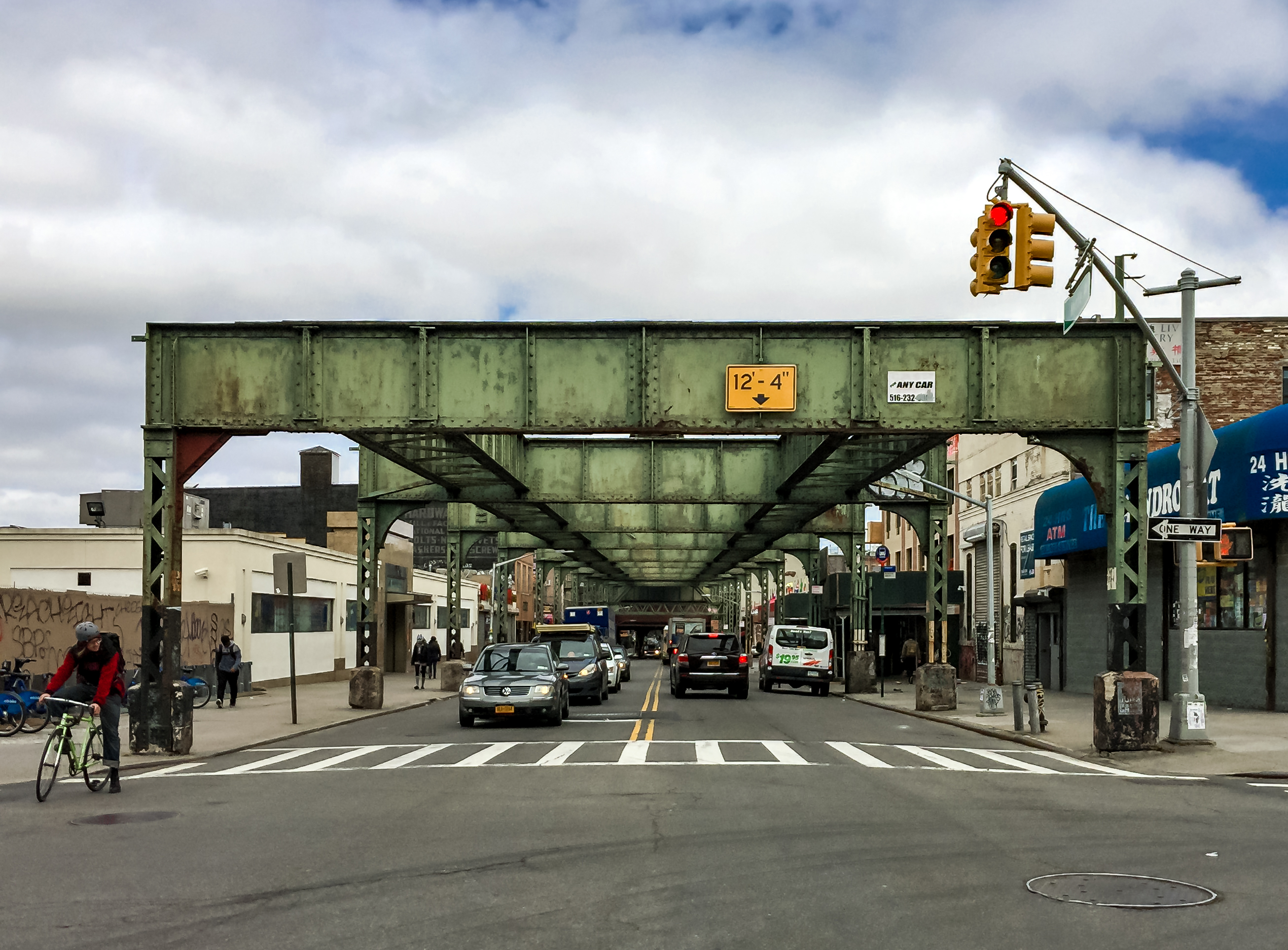
The MJ formerly served the remainder of the Myrtle Avenue elevated, which was demolished in 1969 except for a small stub (pictured)

On March 5, 1944, 11 trains stopped running over the Brooklyn Bridge, instead ending at Bridge–Jay Streets on the Brooklyn side, and all 11 trains terminated there (with a free transfer to the IND trains at Jay Street–Borough Hall). In 1967, when the Chrystie Street Connection opened, the label MJ was assigned to the 11 service.

The western half of the Myrtle Avenue Line closed on October 4, 1969, ending MJ service, which was replaced with a free transfer to the B54 bus. Several days before the scheduled closing date, some supports for the elevated structure were hit by a truck, temporarily suspending service. Timber reinforcement was applied to damaged pillars, allowing service to resume until the scheduled closing date.

== Route ==
=== Signage history ===
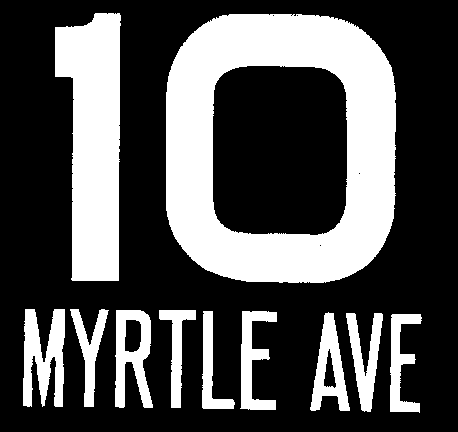
Pre-1967 BMT 10 bullet used on the R1s to R38s

1967–1979 M bullet

1967-1969 MJ bullet

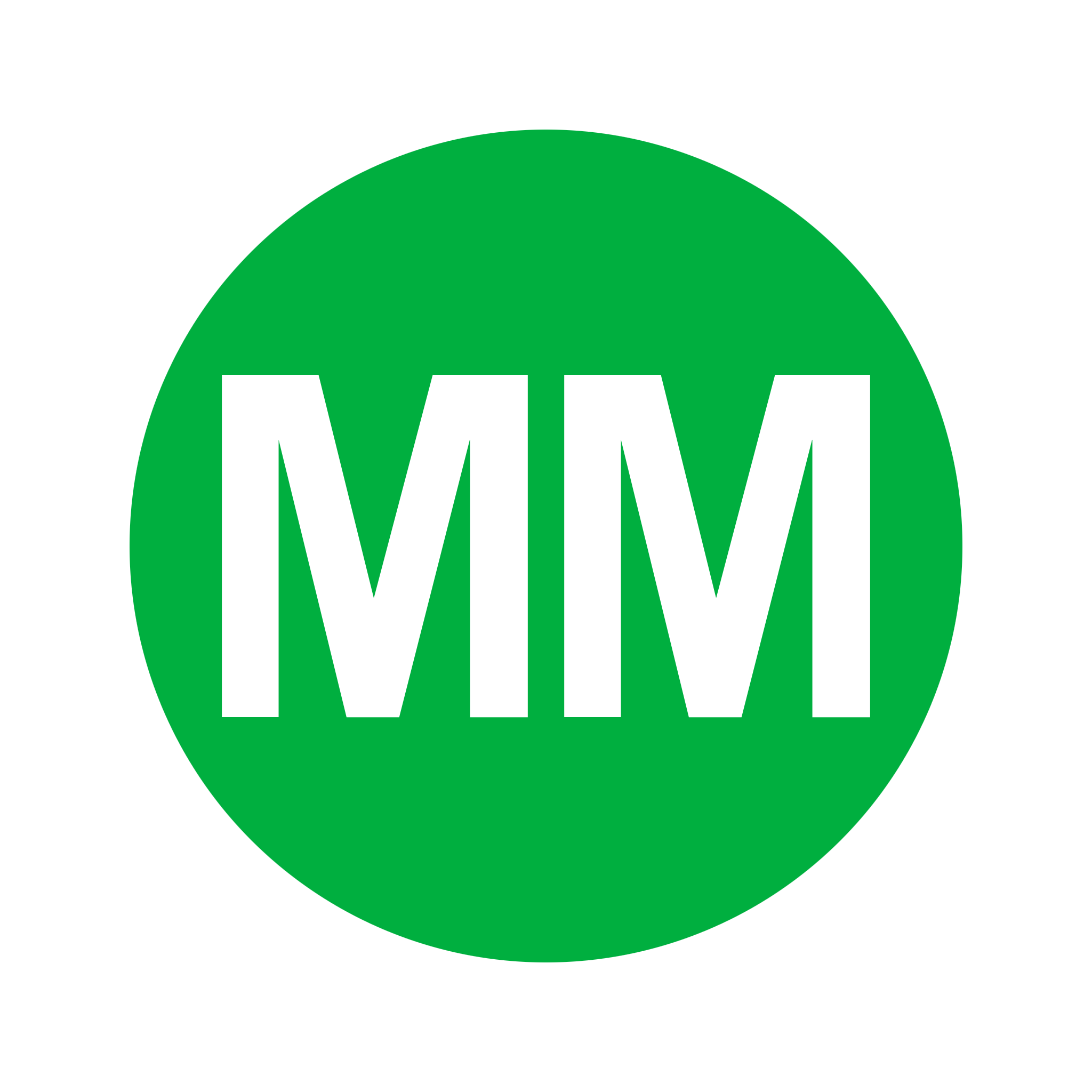
Proposed 1967 MM bullet for the IND Sixth Avenue Line

1979-2010 bullet

1979-2005 Rush hour bullet

The current bullet used since 2010

=== Service pattern ===
The following table shows the lines used by the M, with shaded boxes indicating the route at the specified times:

Line	From	To	Tracks	Times		
Line	From	To	Tracks	weekdays	weekends and evenings	late nights
IND Queens Boulevard Line	Forest Hills–71st Avenue	36th Street	local			
IND 63rd Street Line (full line)	21st Street–Queensbridge	Lexington Avenue–63rd Street	all			
IND Sixth Avenue Line	57th Street		all			
IND Sixth Avenue Line	47th–50th Streets–Rockefeller Center	Broadway–Lafayette Street	local			
Chrystie Street Connection			all			
BMT Nassau Street Line	Essex Street		all			
Williamsburg Bridge			all			
BMT Jamaica Line	Marcy Avenue	Flushing Avenue	local			
BMT Jamaica Line	Myrtle Avenue		all			
BMT Myrtle Avenue Line (full line)	Central Avenue	Middle Village–Metropolitan Avenue	all			

=== Stations ===
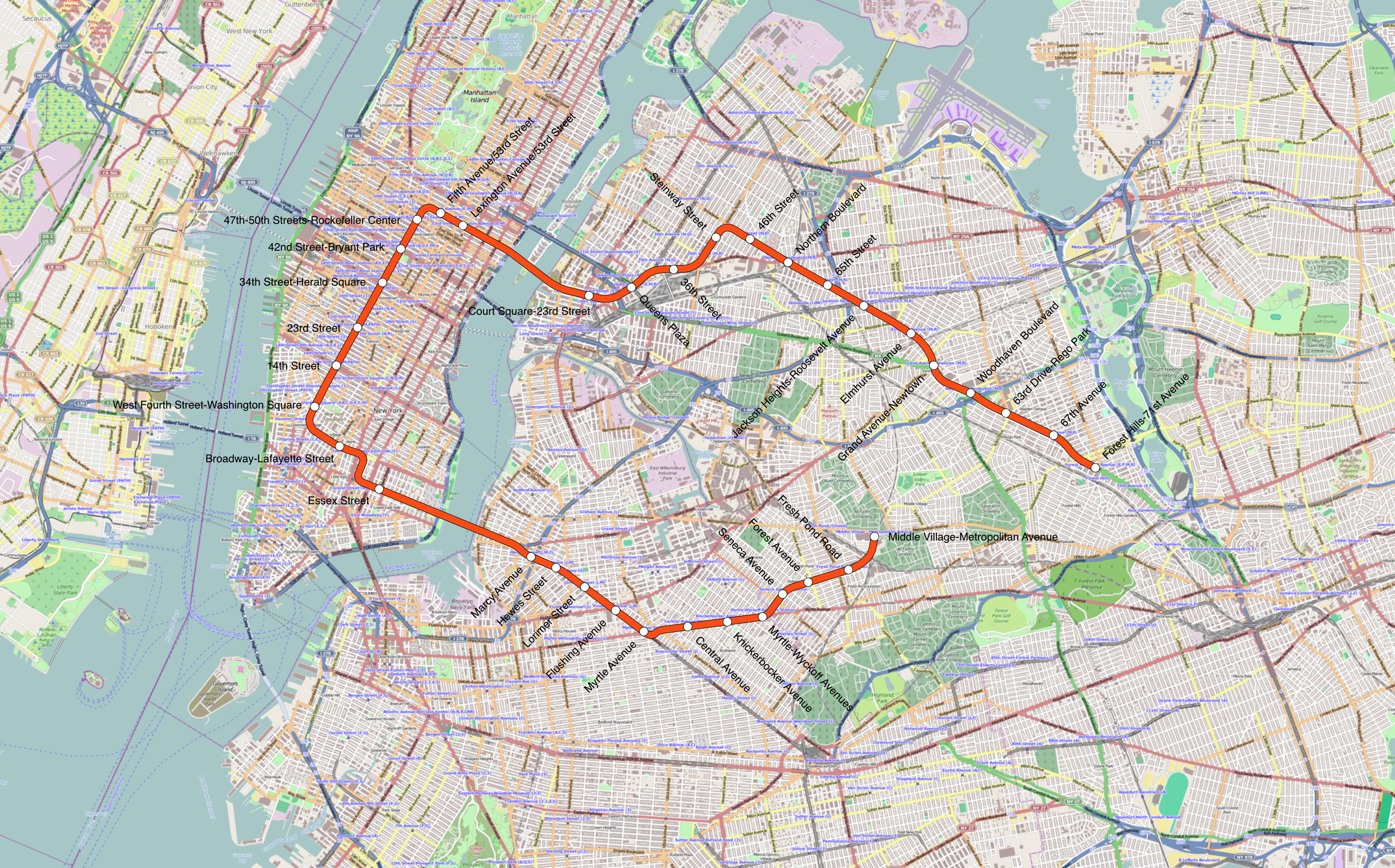
To scale line map

For a more detailed station listing, see the articles on the lines listed above.The M train runs on the following lines:

Station service legend
Stops all times	Stops 24 hours a day
Stops all times except late nights	Stops every day during daytime hours only
Stops weekdays during the day	Stops during weekday daytime hours only
Stops weekends and weekday evenings	Stops during weekend daytime and weekday evening hours
Stops all times except weekdays in the peak direction	Stops every day except during weekdays in the peak direction
Stops rush hours only	Stops during weekday rush hours only
Station closed	Station closed
Stops rush hours in the peak direction only	Stops rush hours/weekdays in the peak direction only
Time period details
Disabled access	Station is compliant with the Americans with Disabilities Act
↑	Station is compliant with the Americans with Disabilities Act in the indicated direction only
↓	Station is compliant with the Americans with Disabilities Act in the indicated direction only
	Elevator access to mezzanine only

M service	Stations	Disabled access	Subway transfers	Connections and notes
Queens
IND Queens Boulevard Line
Stops weekdays during the day	Forest Hills–71st Avenue	Disabled access	E F <F> R	LIRR Main Line at Forest Hills
Stops weekdays during the day	67th Avenue		R	
Stops weekdays during the day	63rd Drive–Rego Park		R	Q72 bus to LaGuardia Airport
Stops weekdays during the day	Woodhaven Boulevard		R	Q52/Q53 Select Bus Service
Stops weekdays during the day	Grand Avenue–Newtown		R	Q53 Select Bus Service
Stops weekdays during the day	Elmhurst Avenue		R	Q53 Select Bus Service
Stops weekdays during the day	Jackson Heights–Roosevelt Avenue	Disabled access	E F <F> R 7 (IRT Flushing Line)	Q33 bus to LaGuardia Airport Marine Air Terminal; Q53 Select Bus Service; Q70 Select Bus Service to LaGuardia Airport
Stops weekdays during the day	65th Street		R	
Stops weekdays during the day	Northern Boulevard	Disabled access	R	
Stops weekdays during the day	46th Street		R	
Stops weekdays during the day	Steinway Street		R	
Stops weekdays during the day	36th Street		R	
63rd Street Line
Stops weekdays during the day	21st Street–Queensbridge	Disabled access		
Manhattan
Stops weekdays during the day	Roosevelt Island	Disabled access		Roosevelt Island Tramway; NYC Ferry: Astoria route
Stops weekdays during the day	Lexington Avenue–63rd Street	Disabled access	N Q R Out-of-system transfers with MetroCard/OMNY: 4 5 6 <6> (IRT Lexington Avenue Line at 59th Street); N R W (BMT Broadway Line at Lexington Avenue–59th Street)	
Sixth Avenue Line
Stops weekdays during the day	57th Street	Disabled access		
Stops weekdays during the day	47th–50th Streets–Rockefeller Center	Disabled access	B D F <F>	
Stops weekdays during the day	42nd Street–Bryant Park	Elevator access to mezzanine only	B D F <F> 7 <7> (IRT Flushing Line at Fifth Avenue); 1 2 3 (IRT Broadway–Seventh Avenue Line at Times Square–42nd Street, daytime only); N Q R W (BMT Broadway Line at Times Square–42nd Street, daytime only); S (42nd Street Shuttle at Times Square, daytime only); A C E (IND Eighth Avenue Line at 42nd Street–Port Authority Bus Terminal, daytime only)	
Stops weekdays during the day	34th Street–Herald Square	Disabled access	B D F <F> N Q R W (BMT Broadway Line)	M34/M34A Select Bus Service; PATH at 33rd Street; Amtrak, LIRR, NJ Transit at Pennsylvania Station
Stops weekdays during the day	23rd Street		F <F>	M23 Select Bus Service; PATH at 23rd Street
Stops weekdays during the day	14th Street	Disabled access	F <F> L (BMT Canarsie Line at Sixth Avenue); 1 2 3 (IRT Broadway–Seventh Avenue Line at 14th Street)	PATH at 14th Street; M14A/D Select Bus Service
Stops weekdays during the day	West Fourth Street–Washington Square	Disabled access	B D F <F> A C E (IND Eighth Avenue Line)	PATH at Ninth Street
Stops weekdays during the day	Broadway–Lafayette Street	Disabled access	B D F <F> 6 <6> (IRT Lexington Avenue Line at Bleecker Street)	
BMT Nassau Street Line
Stops all times except late nights	Essex Street		J Z F <F> (IND Sixth Avenue Line)	M14A Select Bus Service; Clockwise terminal for weekend trains.
Brooklyn
BMT Jamaica Line
Stops all times except late nights	Marcy Avenue	Disabled access	J Z	B44 Select Bus Service; NYC Ferry: East River Route (at South Tenth Street west of Kent Avenue)
Stops all times except late nights	Hewes Street		J	
Stops all times except late nights	Lorimer Street		J	
Stops all times except late nights	Flushing Avenue	Disabled access	J	B15 bus to JFK Int'l Airport
Stops all times	Myrtle Avenue		J Z	Clockwise terminal for late night trains
BMT Myrtle Avenue Line
Stops all times	Central Avenue			
Stops all times	Knickerbocker Avenue			
Stops all times	Myrtle–Wyckoff Avenues	Disabled access	L (BMT Canarsie Line)	
Queens
Stops all times	Seneca Avenue			
Stops all times	Forest Avenue			
Stops all times	Fresh Pond Road			
Stops all times	Middle Village–Metropolitan Avenue	Disabled access		
