= Middle Village–Metropolitan Avenue station =

New York City Subway station in Queens

Middle Village– Metropolitan Avenue
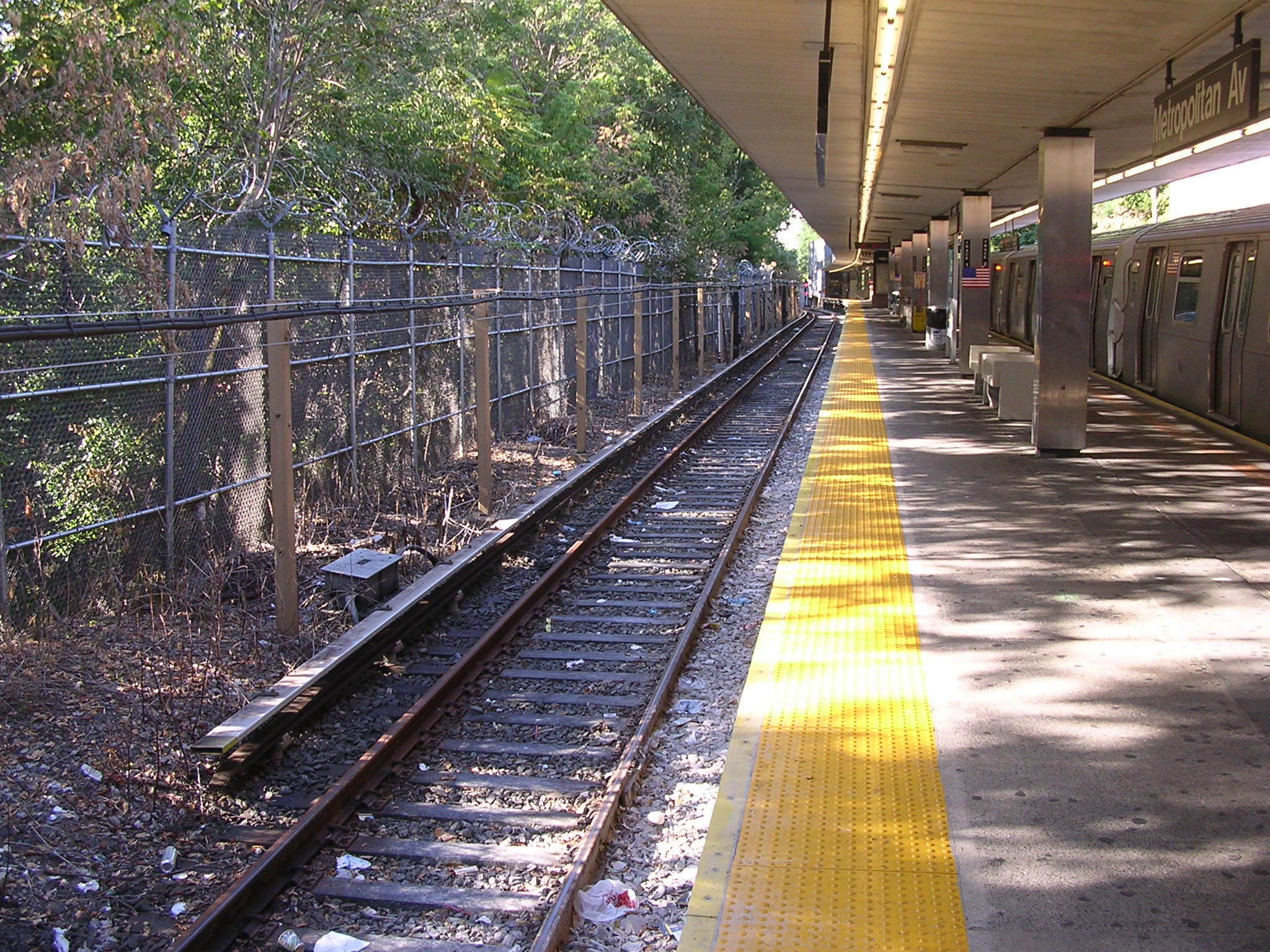
- Platform view

Station statistics
- Address: 67-28 Metropolitan Avenue; Queens, New York
- Borough: Queens
- Locale: Middle Village
- Coordinates: 40.712232°N 73.889194°W
- Division: B (BMT)
- Line: BMT Myrtle Avenue Line
- Services: M (all times)
- Transit: NYCT Bus: Q38, Q54, Q67
- Structure: At-grade at northern end; western side sloped into an embankment at southern end
- Platforms: 1 island platform
- Tracks: 2

Other information
- Opened: October 1, 1906; 120 years ago
- Closed: July 16, 1974; 52 years ago (fire-related closure); July 1, 2017; 9 years ago (temporary line closure)
- Rebuilt: August 9, 1915; 111 years ago (relocation); 1980; 46 years ago (fire-related rebuilding); September 1, 2017; 9 years ago (temporary line closure)
- Accessible: Yes
- Former/other names: Metropolitan Avenue

Traffic
- 2025: 865,241 ▲2.9%
- Rank: 333 out of 423
Services
Preceding station	New York City Subway	Following station
Fresh Pond Road toward Forest Hills–71st Avenue	M (New York City Subway service)	Terminus
Location
Location within New York City Subway
Location within New York City
Location within New York
Track layout
Street map
Station service legend
Symbol	Description
Stops all times	Stops all times

The Middle Village–Metropolitan Avenue station (announced as the Metropolitan Avenue-Middle Village station on trains and signed as Metropolitan Avenue) is a terminal station of the BMT Myrtle Avenue Line of the New York City Subway. It is located at the intersection of Metropolitan Avenue and Rentar Plaza in the neighborhood of Middle Village, Queens. The station is served by the M train at all times.

== History ==
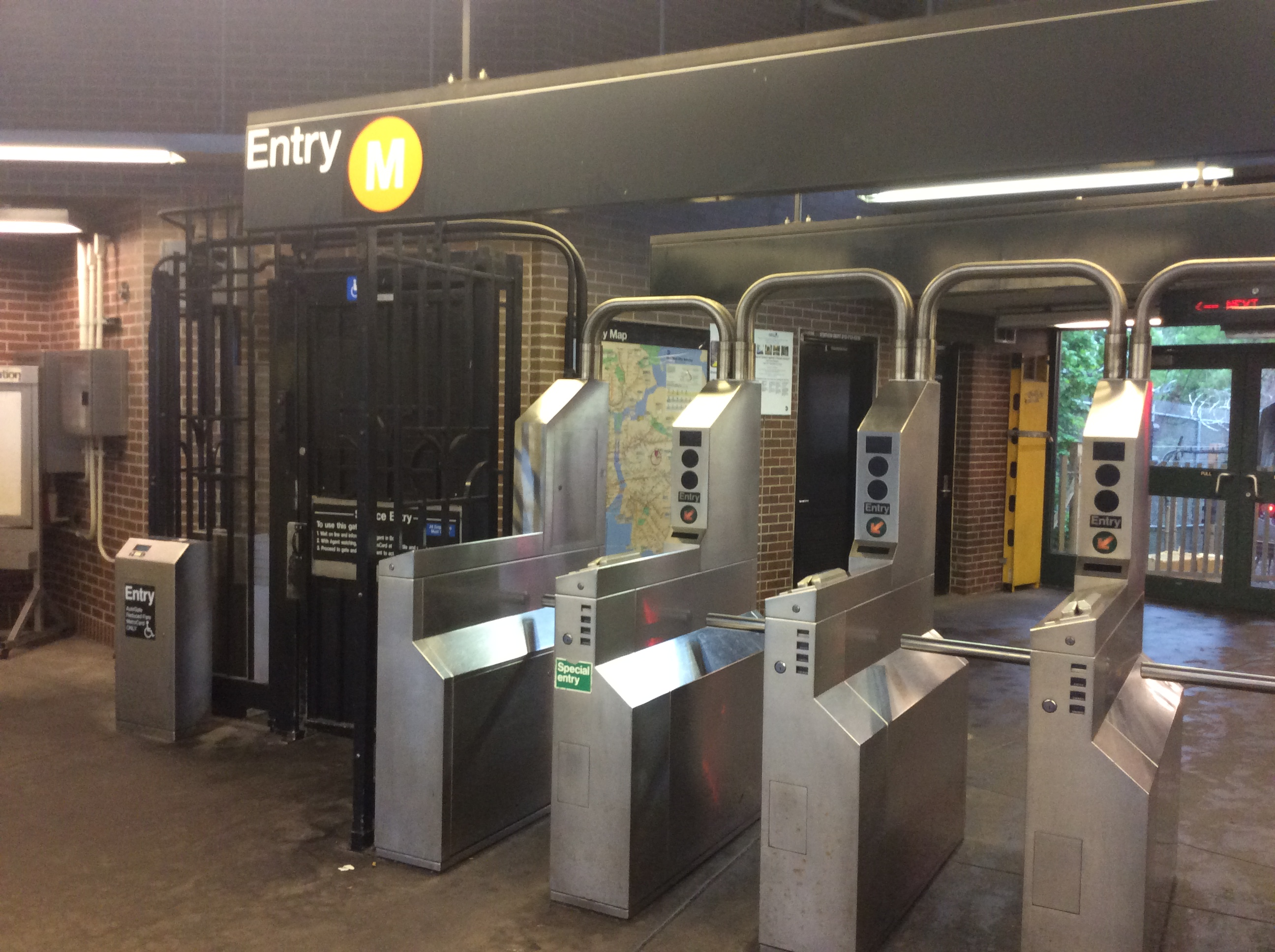
Turnstile bank

The station originally opened on September 3, 1881, as the terminus of the Lutheran Cemetery Line, a former steam dummy surface line. On October 1, 1906, the Lutheran line was connected to the BMT Myrtle Avenue Line via ramp at the Wyckoff Avenue. A second station, just west of the original facility, opened on August 9, 1915, with the other former Lutheran surface stations having been recently elevated. This station was moved due to the original being located in the right-of-way of the then-future New York Connecting Railroad. On July 16, 1974, a fire completely destroyed the original wooden platform and station house along with three R27 cars and one R30 car, along with some fire damage done to four R32 cars, and the station had to be completely rebuilt. It reopened in 1980 with the current concrete platform and brick stationhouse.

By railroad and service directions, the station is the southern terminal of both the Myrtle Avenue Line and full-length M train. It was the northern terminal of the M train by service direction before its reroute on June 27, 2010. Even though this is the M's southern terminal by railroad direction, the service's late-night terminus, Myrtle Avenue, is geographically further south, but the weekend and weekday terminals at Essex Street and Forest Hills–71st Avenue, respectively, are geographically further north.

In 2023, plans were announced for the Interborough Express, a light rail line using the Fremont Secondary right of way. As part of the project, a light rail station at Metropolitan Avenue has been proposed next to the existing subway station.

== Station layout ==
The station, built on an embankment with the north end at street level, has two tracks and a concrete island platform with benches. The tracks end at bumper blocks at the north end of the platform. A steel canopy with fluorescent lights and supported by silver columns covers the entire platform.

On the side of the westernmost track opposite from the platform is an employee-only facility. The control tower for the Myrtle Avenue Line is at the south end of the platform. Just to the south of the station lies the Fresh Pond Yard. It is only accessible from this station, so trains coming from Manhattan and Brooklyn must first enter the station, then reverse into the yard.

=== Exit ===
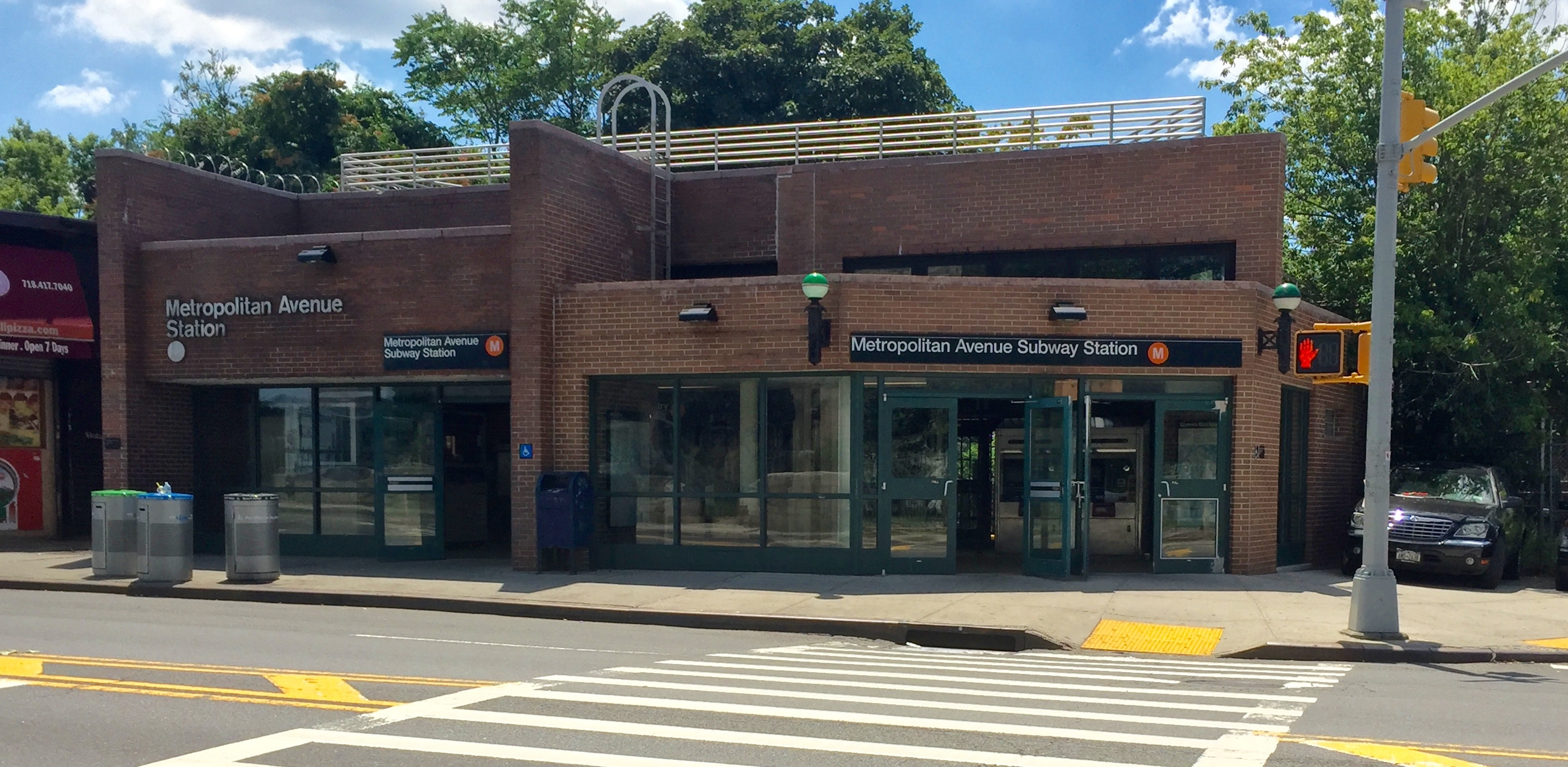
Station entrance

The grade-level station house, the station's only entrance, is located at the eastern corner of Rentar Plaza and Metropolitan Avenue. It is made of bricks with glass windows. There are two pairs of doors leading to the platform, turnstile bank and token booth. Also, there are two pairs of doors out to the street corner and another door along Metropolitan Avenue. Because the station house is at ground level and the platform extends out of the station house, this station is fully ADA-accessible, without an elevator or ramp.

== Points of interest ==
The New York Connecting Railroad travels in an open-cut, directly east of and parallel to the station. A station on the planned Interborough Express light-rail line, which will use the New York Connecting Railroad right of way, has been proposed next to the existing subway station.

A little further east is Christ the King Regional High School. Directly to the west of the station is Metro Mall, a large shopping mall opened in the early 1970s with now relatively few stores. The station is located at Metropolitan Avenue's intersection with Rentar Plaza, which is the access road to the mall's parking lots. The Lutheran All Faiths Cemetery is located across Metropolitan Avenue and near the eastern side of the station.
