= List of bus routes in Brooklyn =

Bus routes in New York City

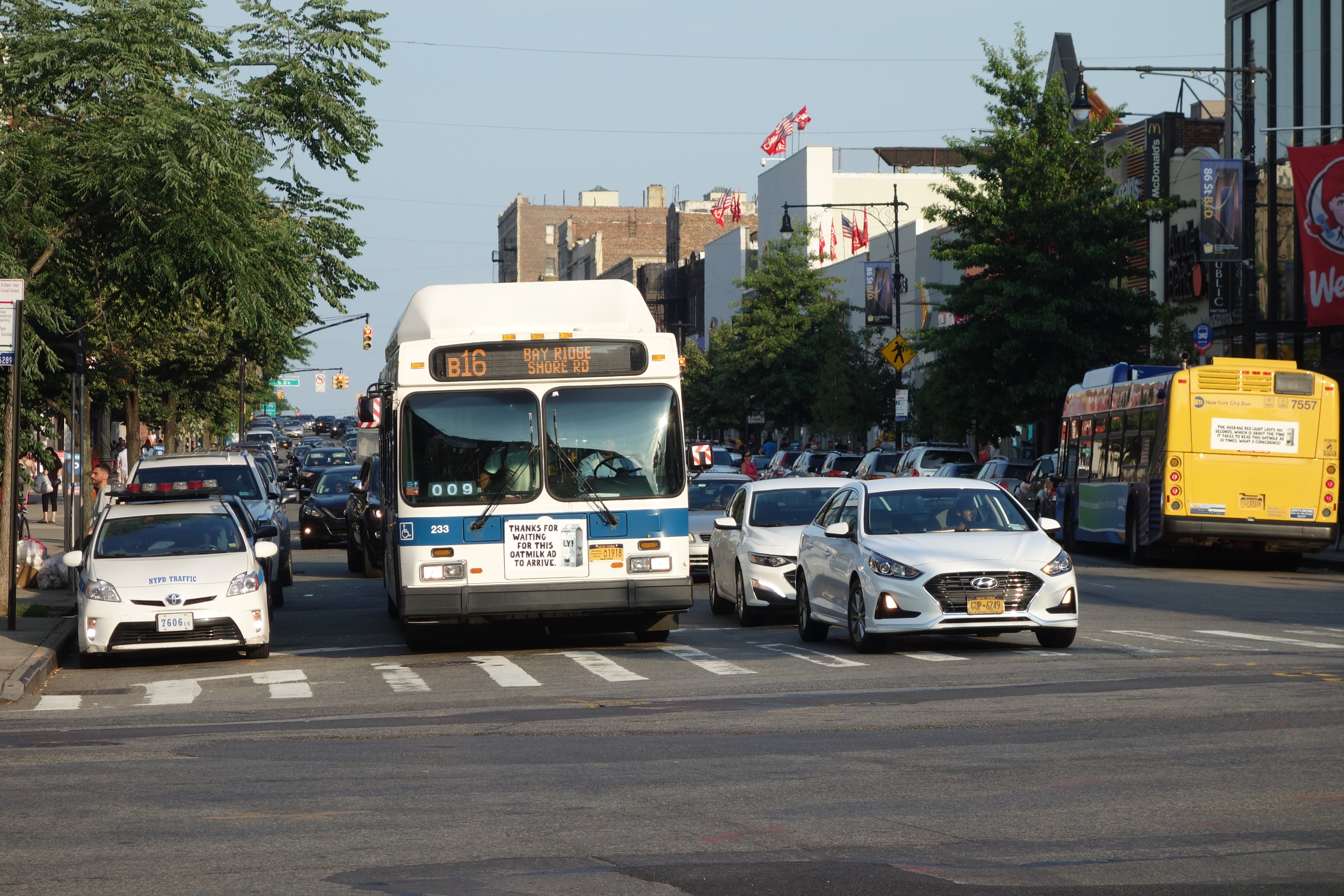
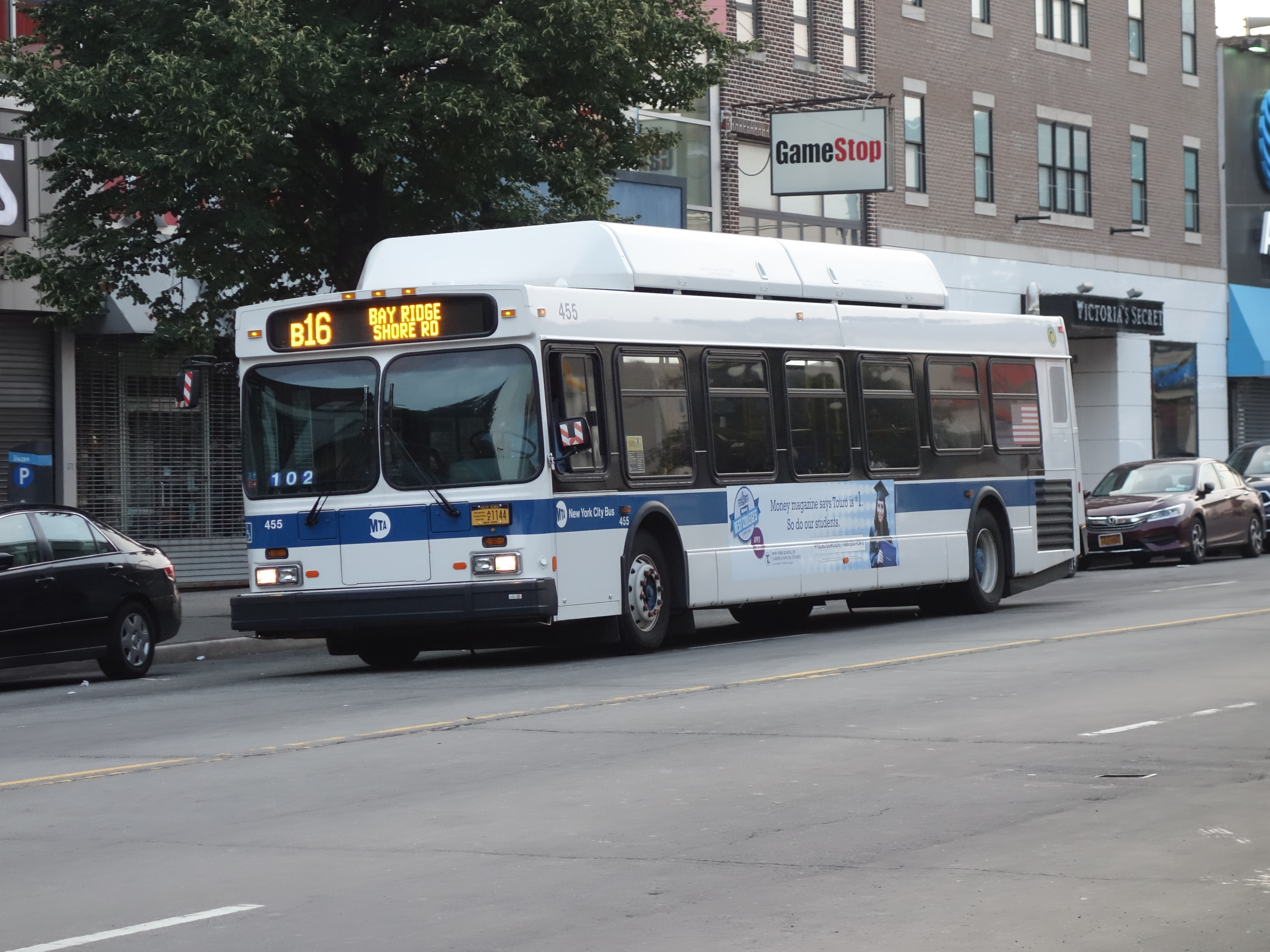
Two New Flyer C40LF buses on the Bay Ridge-bound B16 at 4th Ave/86th St: 233 in July 2019, and 455 in August 2018

The Metropolitan Transportation Authority (MTA) operates a number of bus routes in Brooklyn, New York, United States; one minor route is privately operated under a city franchise. Many of them are direct descendants of streetcar lines (see list of streetcar lines in Brooklyn); most of the ones that started out as bus routes were operated by the Brooklyn Bus Corporation, a subsidiary of the Brooklyn–Manhattan Transit Corporation, until the New York City Board of Transportation took over on June 5, 1940. Of the 55 local Brooklyn routes operated by the New York City Transit Authority, roughly 35 are the direct descendants of one or more streetcar lines, and most of the others were introduced in full or in part as new bus routes by the 1930s. Only the B32, the eastern section of the B82 (then the B50), the B83, and the B84 were created by New York City Transit from scratch, in 1978, 1966, and 2013, respectively.

== List of routes ==
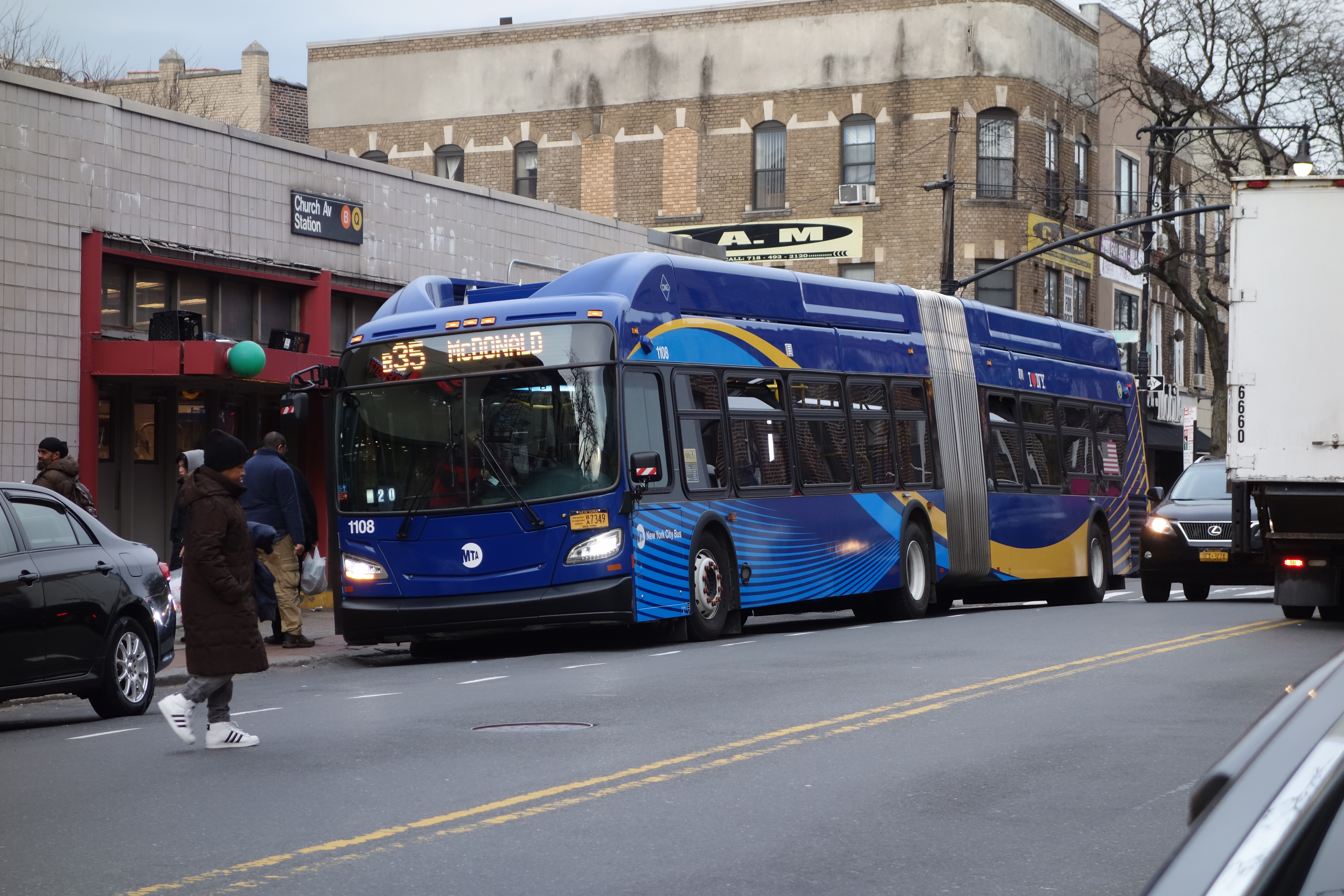
A New Flyer XN60 bus on the B35 local at Flatbush's Church Avenue/East 18th Street in January 2019

This table gives details for the routes prefixed with "B", those considered to run primarily in Brooklyn. For details on routes with other prefixes, see the following articles:

- List of bus routes in Queens: Q7, Q8, Q24, Q35, Q54, Q55, Q56, Q58, Q59, Q98, Q112, J90, T340
- List of bus routes in Staten Island: S53, S79 Select Bus Service, S93
- List of express bus routes in New York City: BM1, BM2, BM3, BM4, BM5, X27, X28, X37, X38

Service operation is generally defined as:

- Weekday rush hours: 6:30 AM – 9:30 AM and 3:30 PM – 8 PM
- Midday service: 9:30 AM – 3:30 PM
- Evening service: 8 PM – Midnight
- Overnight service: Midnight – 6:30 AM

About half of the routes do not operate overnights. Routes marked with an asterisk (*) run 24 hours a day. Connections to New York City Subway stations at the bus routes' terminals are also listed where applicable.

Routes in the following tables are operated by New York City Transit, except the B100 and B103 routes which are operated by MTA Bus Company. All routes operate local service only except the B6, B35, B38, B41, B49, and B103 which also have limited-stop service, as well as the B44, B46, and B82, which also have Select Bus Service.

=== Routes B1 to B39 ===
Route	Terminals			Primary streets traveled	Service operation and notes
B1*	Bay Ridge; 4th Avenue and 87th Street at 86th Street ( train)	↔	Manhattan Beach; Mackenzie Street and Oriental Boulevard at Kingsborough Community College	86th Street, Avenue X, Ocean Parkway, Brighton Beach Avenue	ubvvBHF(R)fqWSLa uSTRg uBHF(R)f udSTRl udSTRq udABZg+r uHST uHST~F uHST~G udSTR+l udABZgr uBHF(L)g udSTRr
B2	Midwood; Quentin Road and East 16th Street at Kings Highway ( trains)	↔	Kings Plaza; Avenue U and Flatbush Avenue	Avenue R	
B3*	Bergen Beach; East 71st Street and Avenue U	↔	Bath Beach; Harway Avenue and 25th Avenue	Avenue U	
B4	Bay Ridge; Narrows Avenue and 77th Street	↔	Sheepshead Bay; Knapp Street and Voorhies Avenue	Bay Ridge Parkway, Stillwell Avenue, Neptune Avenue, Shore Parkway/Emmons Avenue	
B6*	Local Service				
B6*	Limited-Stop Service (Weekdays and Saturdays)				
B6*	Bath Beach; Harway Avenue and Bay 37th Street	↔	East New York; Livonia Avenue and Warwick Street at New Lots Avenue ( trains)	Trips from Bath Beach: Bay Parkway, All trips: Avenue J, Avenue H, Flatlands Avenue; East New York trips: Cozine Avenue, Ashford Street	Limited-stop service Monday to Saturday except overnights.; No local service east of Canarsie when Limited-stop service is running.; Weekend day and evening trips alternate between East New York and Canarsie–Rockaway Parkway station.
B6*	Bath Beach; Harway Avenue and Bay 37th Street	↔	Canarsie; Rockaway Parkway Station ( train)	Trips from Bath Beach: Bay Parkway, All trips: Avenue J, Avenue H, Flatlands Avenue; East New York trips: Cozine Avenue, Ashford Street	Limited-stop service Monday to Saturday except overnights.; No local service east of Canarsie when Limited-stop service is running.; Weekend day and evening trips alternate between East New York and Canarsie–Rockaway Parkway station.
B6*	Midwood; Avenue J and Coney Island Avenue	↔	Canarsie; Rockaway Parkway Station ( train)	Trips from Bath Beach: Bay Parkway, All trips: Avenue J, Avenue H, Flatlands Avenue; East New York trips: Cozine Avenue, Ashford Street	Select weekday local service.
B7	Bedford–Stuyvesant; Saratoga Avenue and Halsey Street at Halsey Street ( train)	↔	Midwood; Quentin Road and Coney Island Avenue	Saratoga Avenue, Kings Highway	
B7	Bedford–Stuyvesant; Saratoga Avenue and Halsey Street at Halsey Street ( train)	↔	Flatlands; Flatbush Avenue and Kings Highway	Saratoga Avenue, Kings Highway	Terminus for early morning and late evening service.
B8*	Brownsville; Hegeman Avenue and Rockaway Avenue	↔	Bay Ridge; 4th Avenue and 95th Street at 95th Street ( train)	All trips: Avenue D Non-East Flatbush trips: Foster Avenue, 18th Avenue, Cropsey Avenue	
B8*	Brownsville; Hegeman Avenue and Rockaway Avenue	↔	Dyker Heights; Brooklyn VA Hospital	All trips: Avenue D Non-East Flatbush trips: Foster Avenue, 18th Avenue, Cropsey Avenue	Select weekday rush hour trips and alternating Saturday afternoon trips.
B8*	Brownsville; Hegeman Avenue and Rockaway Avenue	→ AM ---- ← PM	East Flatbush; Nostrand Avenue and Newkirk Avenue at Newkirk Avenue ( trains)	All trips: Avenue D Non-East Flatbush trips: Foster Avenue, 18th Avenue, Cropsey Avenue	Select terminus/origin in the peak direction.
B9	Bay Ridge; Shore Road and MacKay Place	↔	Kings Plaza Shopping Center; Avenue U and Flatbush Avenue	60th Street, Avenue M, Avenue L, Flatbush Avenue	
B9	Bay Ridge; Shore Road and MacKay Place	↔	Flatlands; Flatbush Avenue and Avenue L	60th Street, Avenue M, Avenue L, Flatbush Avenue	Terminus for early morning and late evening service.
B11	Brooklyn Army Terminal; 1st Avenue and 58th Street	↔	Flatbush; Flatbush Avenue and Nostrand Avenue at Flatbush Avenue ( trains)	49th Street/50th Street, Avenue J	
B11	Sunset Park; 50th Street and 5th Avenue	→ AM	Flatbush; Flatbush Avenue and Nostrand Avenue at Flatbush Avenue ( trains)	49th Street/50th Street, Avenue J	Alternate morning rush origin.
B12*	Prospect Lefferts Gardens; Ocean Avenue and Parkside Avenue at Parkside Avenue ( train)	↔	East New York; East New York Avenue and Alabama Avenue at Alabama Avenue ( trains)	Clarkson Avenue, East New York Avenue	
B13	Gateway Center Mall	↔	Bushwick; Wyckoff Avenue and DeKalb Avenue at DeKalb Avenue ( train), Wyckoff Hospital	Crescent Street, Fresh Pond Road, Gates Avenue	Operates via Glendale and Ridgewood, Queens.
B14*	Crown Heights; Utica Avenue and Eastern Parkway at Utica Avenue ( trains)	↔	Brooklyn General Mail Facility	Pitkin Avenue, Sutter Avenue	
B15*	Bedford–Stuyvesant; Broadway and Marcus Garvey Boulevard at Flushing Avenue ( trains)	↔	East New York; Linden Boulevard and Drew Street	All trips: Marcus Garvey Boulevard/Lewis Avenue, East 98th Street, New Lots Avenue, Linden Boulevard; Airport trips: Conduit Avenue	Terminal for alternating rush hour trips on weekdays and Sundays.; Terminal for alternating Saturday trips during the day.
B15*	Bedford–Stuyvesant; Broadway and Marcus Garvey Boulevard at Flushing Avenue ( trains)	↔	JFK Airport, Queens; Lefferts Boulevard (AirTrain JFK)	All trips: Marcus Garvey Boulevard/Lewis Avenue, East 98th Street, New Lots Avenue, Linden Boulevard; Airport trips: Conduit Avenue	Operates nonstop on Conduit Avenue between Linden Boulevard/79th Street and Lefferts Boulevard.; Service alternates with short-turns above.
B16	Bay Ridge; Shore Road and 4th Avenue	↔	Prospect Lefferts Gardens; Flatbush Avenue and Lincoln Road at Prospect Park ( trains)	Fort Hamilton Parkway,14th Avenue/13th Avenue, Caton Avenue, Ocean Avenue	Extra weekday morning Bay Ridge-bound trips on school days only begin at 37th Street or 60th Street with some of these terminating at 86th Street/Narrows Avenue.
B17*	Crown Heights; Eastern Parkway and Utica Avenue at Utica Avenue ( trains)	↔	Canarsie; East 108th Street and Seaview Avenue (all times)	All trips: Remsen Avenue, Seaview Avenue; East 80th Street trips via Rockaway Parkway Station ( train) and Avenue L	
B17*	Crown Heights; Eastern Parkway and Utica Avenue at Utica Avenue ( trains)	↔	Canarsie; Seaview Avenue and East 80th Street	All trips: Remsen Avenue, Seaview Avenue; East 80th Street trips via Rockaway Parkway Station ( train) and Avenue L	Rush hour and weekday evening service only.
B20	Brooklyn General Mail Facility	↔	Ridgewood, Queens; Forest Avenue and 67th Avenue at Forest Avenue ( train)	All trips: Linden Boulevard, Wortman Avenue, Pennsylvania Avenue; Ridgewood trips: Decatur Street/Summerfield and Schaeffer Streets, Fresh Pond Road	
B20	Brooklyn General Mail Facility	↔	East New York; Van Sinderen Avenue and Fulton Street at Broadway Junction ( trains)	All trips: Linden Boulevard, Wortman Avenue, Pennsylvania Avenue; Ridgewood trips: Decatur Street/Summerfield and Schaeffer Streets, Fresh Pond Road	Weekday and Sunday afternoon terminal, weekday evening rush terminal.
B24	Williamsburg Bridge Plaza; Lane 2	↔	Greenpoint; Greenpoint Avenue and Manhattan Avenue at Greenpoint Avenue ( train)	Metropolitan Avenue, Kingsland Avenue, Meeker Avenue, Greenpoint Avenue	Operates via Sunnyside, Queens.; Travels between Brooklyn and Queens via the Kosciuszko Bridge.; Trips to Manhattan Avenue loop around West Street, Kent Street, and Franklin Street.; The first four trips to Manhattan Avenue begin at Kingsland Avenue.
B25*	Fulton Landing; Front Street and York Street	↔	East New York; Jamaica Avenue and Alabama Avenue at Alabama Avenue ( trains)	Fulton Street	
B26*	Downtown Brooklyn; Cadman Plaza West and Tillary Street	↔	Ridgewood Intermodal Terminal at Myrtle–Wyckoff Avenues ( trains)	Fulton Street, Halsey Street	
B31	Midwood; Quentin Road and East 16th Street at Kings Highway Station ( trains)	↔	Gerritsen Beach; Gerritsen Avenue and Lois Avenue	Avenue R, Gerritsen Avenue	
B32	Williamsburg Bridge Plaza	↔	Long Island City, Queens; 44th Drive and 21st Street at Court Square–23rd Street ( trains)	Kent Avenue/Wythe Avenue, Franklin Street	No late evening service.; Travels between Brooklyn and Queens via the Pulaski Bridge.
B35*	Local Service				
B35*	Limited-Stop Service				
B35*	Brownsville; Watkins Street and Hegeman Avenue	↔	Sunset Park; 3rd Avenue and 39th Street	All trips: Church Avenue; Sunset Park trips: 39th Street	No local service west of McDonald Avenue when Limited-stop service is running.
B35*	East Flatbush; Church Avenue and Kings Highway	→ AM	Kensington; Church Avenue and McDonald Avenue at Church Avenue ( trains)	All trips: Church Avenue; Sunset Park trips: 39th Street	Select local origin in the morning rush.
B36*	Sea Gate; West 37th Street and Surf Avenue	↔	Sheepshead Bay; Gravesend Neck Road and Nostrand Avenue	Surf Avenue, Avenue Z, Nostrand Avenue	Limited overnight trips from Sea Gate terminate at Surf Avenue and Stillwell Avenue.
B37	Fort Hamilton; Shore Road and 4th Avenue	↔	Boerum Hill; 4th Avenue and Dean Street at Atlantic Avenue–Barclays Center ( trains)	3rd Avenue	
B38*	Local Service				
B38*	Limited-Stop Service (Weekdays to/from Seneca Av/Cornelia St only)				
B38*	Downtown Brooklyn; Cadman Plaza West and Tillary Street	↔	Ridgewood, Queens; Seneca Avenue and Cornelia Street	All trips: DeKalb Avenue/Lafayette Avenue, Cornelia Street trips: Seneca Avenue; Metropolitan Avenue trips: Stanhope Street	Limited-stop service weekdays, local service all other times.
B38*	Downtown Brooklyn; Cadman Plaza West and Tillary Street	↔	Ridgewood, Queens; Metropolitan Avenue and Starr Street	All trips: DeKalb Avenue/Lafayette Avenue, Cornelia Street trips: Seneca Avenue; Metropolitan Avenue trips: Stanhope Street	Local service only, no overnight service.
B39	Williamsburg Bridge Plaza; Lane 1	↔	Lower East Side, Manhattan; Delancey Street and Allen Street	Delancey Street	Travels between Brooklyn and Manhattan via the Williamsburg Bridge.

=== Routes B41 to B103 ===
Route	Terminals			Primary streets traveled	Service operation and notes
B41*	Local Service				
B41*	Limited-Stop Service (Weekdays to/from Bergen Beach; All Day to/from Kings Plaza)				
B41*	Downtown Brooklyn; Cadman Plaza and Tillary Street	↔	Kings Plaza Shopping Center; Avenue U and Flatbush Avenue	All trips: Flatbush Avenue; Bergen Beach trips: Avenue N	Some buses go to Bergen Beach instead of Kings Plaza. On weekends, this branch has no limited-stop service and less frequency.
B41*	Flatbush; Flatbush Avenue and Church Avenue	→ AM	Bergen Beach; East 71st Street and Veterans Avenue	All trips: Flatbush Avenue; Bergen Beach trips: Avenue N	Two A.M. rush local trips to Bergen Beach originate here.
B41*	Flatbush; Flatbush Avenue and Nostrand Avenue at Flatbush Avenue ( trains)	→	Bergen Beach; East 71st Street and Veterans Avenue	All trips: Flatbush Avenue; Bergen Beach trips: Avenue N	One A.M. rush and one P.M. rush local trips to Bergen Beach originate here.
B41*	Prospect Lefferts Gardens; Flatbush Avenue and Empire Boulevard	← AM	Flatlands; Flatbush Avenue and Troy Avenue	All trips: Flatbush Avenue; Bergen Beach trips: Avenue N	Two early morning local trips to Empire Boulevard originate here.; Select A.M. rush Limited buses also turn around at Empire Boulevard from Kings Plaza or Bergen Beach.
B42*	Canarsie; Shore Parkway (Canarsie Pier Loop)	↔	Canarsie; Rockaway Parkway Station ( train)	Rockaway Parkway	Bus terminates/originates next to the Rockaway Parkway station outside fare control.
B43*	Prospect Lefferts Gardens; Lincoln Road and Flatbush Avenue at Prospect Park ( trains)	↔	Greenpoint; Box Street and Manhattan Avenue	Kingston and Throop Avenues/Tompkins and Brooklyn Avenues, Graham Avenue, Manhattan Avenue	
B44*	Local Service				
B44*	Select Bus Service (All Day)				
B44*	Williamsburg Bridge Plaza; Lane 4	↔	Sheepshead Bay; Knapp Street and Shore Parkway	Nostrand Avenue, Rogers Avenue (northbound SBS), Bedford Avenue, New York Avenue (northbound local)	Full route by SBS during the day and limited amount of local trips in the late evening and early morning hours.; No local service north of Flushing Avenue when SBS is running.
B44*	Williamsburg; Bedford Avenue and Flushing Avenue (last drop-off); Lee Avenue and Flushing Avenue (first pick-up)	↔	Sheepshead Bay; Nostrand Avenue and Avenue U	Nostrand Avenue, Rogers Avenue (northbound SBS), Bedford Avenue, New York Avenue (northbound local)	Every other local and SBS trip.
B44*	Williamsburg; Bedford Avenue and Flushing Avenue (last drop-off); Lee Avenue and Flushing Avenue (first pick-up)	← AM	Flatbush; Nostrand Avenue and Flatbush Avenue (local) or Avenue H (SBS) at Flatbush Avenue ( trains)	Nostrand Avenue, Rogers Avenue (northbound SBS), Bedford Avenue, New York Avenue (northbound local)	Four A.M. rush trips to Flushing Avenue begin here, two local and two SBS.
B44*	Crown Heights; Nostrand Avenue and Eastern Parkway at Nostrand Avenue ( trains)	→ AM	Sheepshead Bay; Emmons Avenue and Nostrand Avenue (last drop-off); Emmons Avenue and Haring Street (first pick-up)	Nostrand Avenue, Rogers Avenue (northbound SBS), Bedford Avenue, New York Avenue (northbound local)	Two early morning local trips to Sheepshead Bay begin here. The second terminates at Shore Parkway.; All overnight local service is extended to Emmons Avenue from Williamsburg in both directions.
B45	Downtown Brooklyn; Court Street and Livingston Street	↔	Crown Heights; St. Johns Place and Ralph Avenue	Atlantic Avenue, St. Johns Place	
B46*	Local Service				
B46*	Select Bus Service (All Day)				
B46*	Kings Plaza; Flatbush Avenue and Avenue U	↔	Williamsburg Bridge Plaza; Lane 3	Utica Avenue, Malcolm X Boulevard (both variants); Broadway (local only)	No SBS service north of DeKalb Avenue.; The 6:52pm local trip to Williamsburg terminates at Eastern Parkway.
B46*	Flatlands; Utica Avenue and Avenue N	↔	Bedford–Stuyvesant; Malcolm X Boulevard and DeKalb Avenue	Utica Avenue, Malcolm X Boulevard (both variants); Broadway (local only)	SBS rush hour service only.
B46*	East Flatbush; Utica Avenue and Avenue H	↔	Crown Heights; Utica Avenue and Eastern Parkway at Utica Avenue ( trains)	Utica Avenue, Malcolm X Boulevard (both variants); Broadway (local only)	Rush hour local turnarounds.; Select A.M. rush and three P.M. rush local trips to Eastern Parkway originate at Avenue N.
B46*	Flatlands; Utica Avenue and Fillmore Avenue	←	Crown Heights; Utica Avenue and Eastern Parkway at Utica Avenue ( trains)	Utica Avenue, Malcolm X Boulevard (both variants); Broadway (local only)	Select rush hour and evening local trips in the southbound direction only.
B47*	Kings Plaza; East 54th Street and Avenue U	↔	Bedford–Stuyvesant; Broadway and Marcus Garvey Boulevard at Flushing Avenue ( trains)	All trips: Ralph Avenue; Non-Brownsville trips: Broadway	
B47*	Kings Plaza; East 54th Street and Avenue U	← AM	Brownsville; Rutland Road and East 98th Street at Sutter Avenue-Rutland Road ( trains)	All trips: Ralph Avenue; Non-Brownsville trips: Broadway	Alternate morning rush trips to Kings Plaza begin here.
B48*	Prospect Lefferts Gardens; Lincoln Road and Flatbush Avenue at Prospect Park ( trains)	↔	Greenpoint; Meeker Avenue and Gardner Avenue	Classon Avenue/Franklin Avenue, Lorimer Street, Nassau Avenue	
B49	Local Service				
B49	Limited-Stop Service (Weekday AM Rush Hours; Southbound from Empire Blvd only)				
B49	Bedford–Stuyvesant; Fulton Street and Bedford Avenue at Franklin Avenue ( trains)	→	Flatbush; Bedford Avenue and Avenue D	Bedford Avenue, Ocean Avenue, Rogers Avenue (local only)	On weekdays, the 4:05pm trip to KCC terminates here, plus one overnight trip on Mondays and another PM rush trip when schools are closed.
B49	Bedford–Stuyvesant; Fulton Street and Bedford Avenue at Franklin Avenue ( trains)	← AM	Flatbush; Rogers Avenue and Foster Avenue	Bedford Avenue, Ocean Avenue, Rogers Avenue (local only)	Select A.M. rush service to Bed-Stuy originates here.
B49	Bedford–Stuyvesant; Fulton Street and Bedford Avenue at Franklin Avenue ( trains)	↔	Kingsborough Community College	Bedford Avenue, Ocean Avenue, Rogers Avenue (local only)	Full route; local service only.
B49	Crown Heights; Bedford Avenue and Empire Boulevard	→ AM	Kingsborough Community College	Bedford Avenue, Ocean Avenue, Rogers Avenue (local only)	These trips run as Limited-stop buses, only southbound in the A.M. rush.
B49	Flatbush; Foster Avenue and Bedford Avenue or Midwood; Ocean Avenue and Avenue P	→ AM	Kingsborough Community College	Bedford Avenue, Ocean Avenue, Rogers Avenue (local only)	Some A.M. rush local trips to KCC originate at one of the two intersections.
B49	Sheepshead Bay; Ocean Avenue and Avenue S	← AM	Kingsborough Community College	Bedford Avenue, Ocean Avenue, Rogers Avenue (local only)	Two overnight trips from KCC terminate here on Mondays.
B52*	Downtown Brooklyn; Cadman Plaza West	↔	Ridgewood Intermodal Terminal at Myrtle–Wyckoff Avenues ( trains)	Fulton Street, Gates Avenue	
B54*	Downtown Brooklyn; MetroTech Center at Jay Street–MetroTech ( trains)	↔	Ridgewood Intermodal Terminal at Myrtle–Wyckoff Avenues ( trains)	Myrtle Avenue	
B57	Red Hook; Beard Street and Otsego Street at Ikea Terminal	↔	Maspeth, Queens; 61st Street and Flushing Avenue	Smith Street/Court Street, Flushing Avenue	
B60*	Canarsie; Williams Avenue and Flatlands Avenue	↔	Williamsburg Bridge Plaza; Lane 2	Rockaway Avenue, Wilson Avenue, Meserole and South 4th Streets/South 5th Street and Montrose Avenue	Fare-free service for six to 12 months started on September 24, 2023, and ended August 31, 2024.
B61*	Downtown Brooklyn; Livingston Street and Smith Street at Jay Street–MetroTech ( trains)	↔	Windsor Terrace; 19th Street and Prospect Park West	9th Street, Van Brunt Street, Columbia Street, Atlantic Avenue	Free additional transfer to B62 in Downtown Brooklyn.
B62*	Downtown Brooklyn; Boerum Place and Livingston Street	↔	Astoria, Queens; 2nd Street and 26th Avenue	Flushing Avenue, Bedford Avenue/Driggs Avenue, Manhattan Avenue, 21st Street	Travels between Brooklyn and Queens via the Pulaski Bridge.; Free additional transfer to B61 in Downtown Brooklyn.; Terminal moved from Queensboro Plaza to Astoria on August 31, 2025 in conjunction with Phase Two of the Queens Bus Redesign.
B63*	Fort Hamilton; Shore Road and 4th Avenue	↔	Brooklyn Bridge Park; Pier 6	5th Avenue, Atlantic Avenue	
B64	Bay Ridge; Shore Road and MacKay Place	↔	Coney Island; Mermaid Avenue and Stillwell Avenue at Stillwell Avenue ( trains)	Bay Ridge Avenue, 13th Avenue, Bath Avenue, Harway Avenue	
B65	Downtown Brooklyn; Fulton Street and Smith Street at Jay Street–MetroTech ( trains)	↔	Ocean Hill–Brownsville; Ralph Avenue and Saint Johns Place	Dean Street/Bergen Street	
B67; B69	Kensington; Cortelyou Road and McDonald Avenue	↔	Downtown Brooklyn; Jay Street and Sands Street at York Street ( trains)	All trips: McDonald Avenue, 7th Avenue; Most B67 trips: Flatbush Avenue, Jay Street; B69 trips: Vanderbilt Avenue, Flushing Avenue	B67 terminal, evenings and weekends.; B69 terminal, all service.
B67; B69	Kensington; Cortelyou Road and McDonald Avenue	↔	Williamsburg; Division Avenue and Wythe Avenue	All trips: McDonald Avenue, 7th Avenue; Most B67 trips: Flatbush Avenue, Jay Street; B69 trips: Vanderbilt Avenue, Flushing Avenue	B67 terminal, rush hours and middays (via Brooklyn Navy Yard).
B67; B69	Kensington; Cortelyou Road and McDonald Avenue	→ AM	Sunset Park; 7th Avenue and 19th Street.	All trips: McDonald Avenue, 7th Avenue; Most B67 trips: Flatbush Avenue, Jay Street; B69 trips: Vanderbilt Avenue, Flushing Avenue	Two northbound B67 trips terminate here in the A.M. rush.
B68*	Park Slope; Bartel Pritchard Square at 15th Street–Prospect Park ( trains)	↔	Coney Island; Stillwell Avenue and Mermaid Bus Loop at Stillwell Avenue ( trains)	Prospect Park Southwest, Coney Island Avenue, Brighton Beach Avenue	
B70	Sunset Park; 3rd Avenue and 39th Street	↔	V.A. Medical Center	39th Street, 8th Avenue, 7th Avenue	
B74	Coney Island; Stillwell Avenue and Mermaid Bus Loop at Stillwell Avenue ( trains)	↻	Sea Gate; West 37th Street and Neptune Avenue	Mermaid Avenue	Clockwise loop in Sea Gate.
B82*	Local Service				
B82*	Select Bus Service (Weekdays)				
B82*	Spring Creek; Pennsylvania Avenue and Seaview Avenue at Starrett City	↔	Bath Beach; Crospey Avenue and Bay 38th Street	All trips: Pennsylvania Avenue, Flatlands Avenue, Kings Highway, Bay Parkway; Coney Island trips: Cropsey Avenue	All SBS trips terminate at Crospey Avenue. No SBS service on weekends.; Alternating local trips terminate here Saturday afternoons and Sundays during the day.
B82*	Spring Creek; Pennsylvania Avenue and Seaview Avenue at Starrett City	↔	Coney Island; Mermaid Bus Loop at Stillwell Avenue ( trains)	All trips: Pennsylvania Avenue, Flatlands Avenue, Kings Highway, Bay Parkway; Coney Island trips: Cropsey Avenue	Full route; local service only.
B83	Spring Creek; Pennsylvania Avenue and Seaview Avenue at Starrett City	→ AM ---- ← PM	East New York; Van Sinderen Avenue and Fulton Street at Broadway Junction ( trains)	Pennsylvania Avenue, Van Siclen Avenue, Pennsylvania Avenue	Alternate terminus/origin in the peak direction
B83	Gateway Center Mall	↔	East New York; Van Sinderen Avenue and Fulton Street at Broadway Junction ( trains)	Pennsylvania Avenue, Van Siclen Avenue, Pennsylvania Avenue	
B84	Gateway Center Mall	↔	East New York; Livonia Avenue and Warwick Street at New Lots Avenue ( trains)	Flatlands Avenue, Ashford Street	No evening and night service.
B100	Midwood; East 16th Street and Quentin Road at Kings Highway ( trains)	↔	Mill Basin; National Drive and Mill Avenue (last drop-off); 56th Drive and Strickland Avenue (first pick-up)	Quentin Road, Fillmore Avenue, East 66th Street	
B103	Limited-Stop Service				
B103	Canarsie; Williams Avenue and Flatlands Avenue	↔	Flatbush; Flatbush Avenue and Nostrand Avenue at Flatbush Avenue ( trains)	All trips: East 105th Street, Avenue M, East 80th Street, Avenue H Downtown trips: Cortelyou Road, Third/Fourth Avenues, Livingston Street	Every other trip terminates here during the day
B103	Canarsie; Williams Avenue and Flatlands Avenue	↔	Downtown Brooklyn; Tillary Street and Cadman Plaza East	All trips: East 105th Street, Avenue M, East 80th Street, Avenue H Downtown trips: Cortelyou Road, Third/Fourth Avenues, Livingston Street	Full route

=== Subway shuttle routes ===
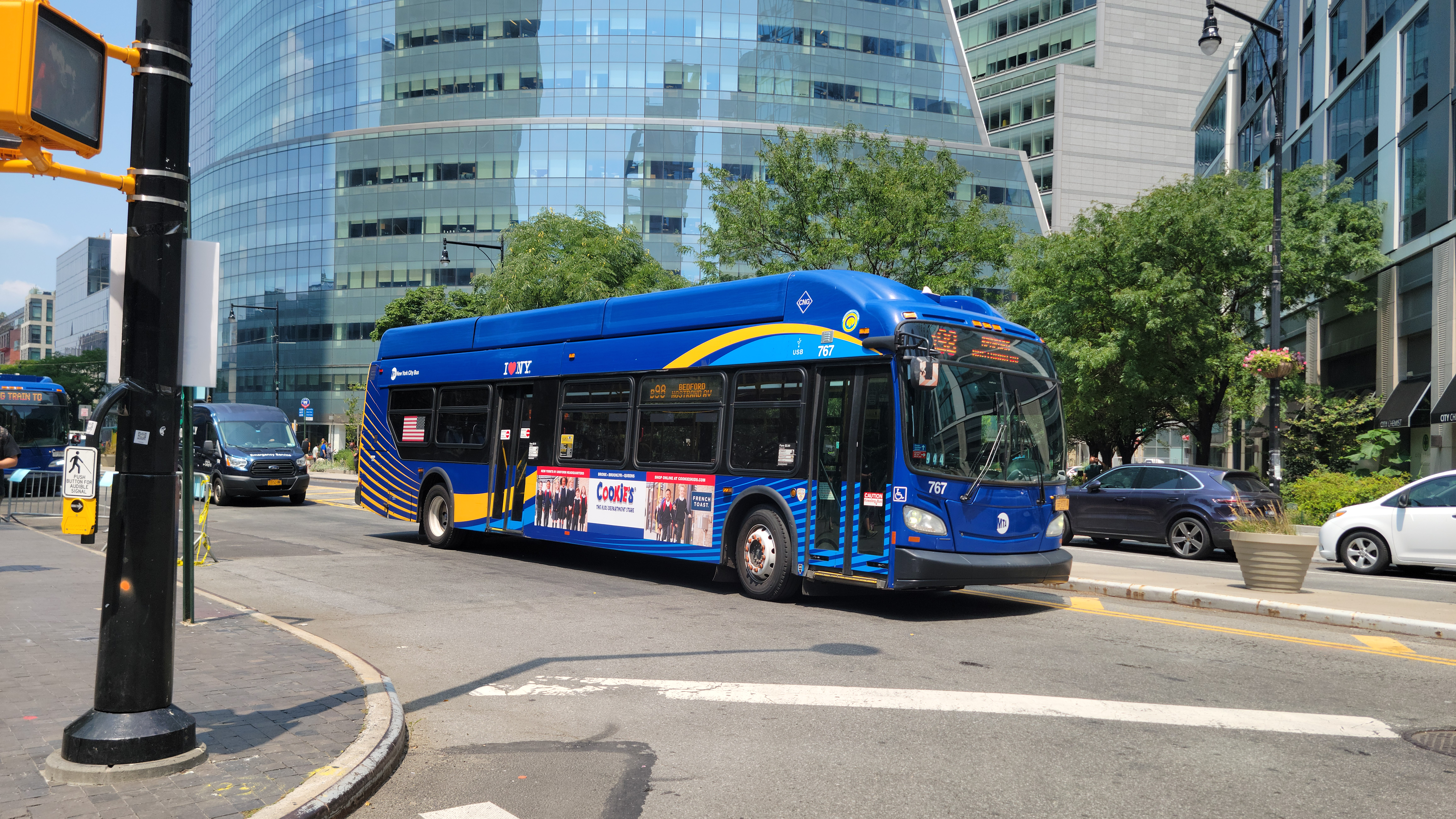
A 2017 XN40 (767) on the southbound B98 (now T403) on 44th Drive during a signal project in 2024

The following table lists the scheduled NYC Bus routes that temporarily replace portions of service on the New York City Subway due to system maintenance.

Route	NYCS Service	Terminals			Primary streets traveled
B90	train	Church Avenue ( trains)	↔	Coney Island-Stillwell Avenue ( trains)	McDonald Avenue
B93	train	Bedford-Nostrand Avenues ( train)	↔	Jay Street-Metrotech ( trains)	DeKalb Avenue/Lafayette Avenue
B94	train	Nassau Avenue ( train)	↔	Court Square, Queens ( trains)	Manhattan Avenue, Jackson Avenue
B96	train	Franklin Avenue/Botanic Garden ( trains)	↔	Flatbush Avenue-Brooklyn College ( train)	Eastern Parkway, Nostrand Avenue, New York Avenue
B99	train	Crown Heights–Utica Avenue ( train)	↔	New Lots Avenue ( train)	East 98th Street, Livonia Avenue
B102	train	Kings Highway ( train)	↔	Coney Island-Stillwell Avenue ( trains)	Ocean Avenue, Avenue Z, Brighton Beach Avenue, Surf Avenue
B106	train	Hewes Street ( trains)	↔	Essex Street, Manhattan ( trains)	Broadway, Delancey Street
B111	train	Myrtle–Wyckoff Avenues ( trains)	↔	Atlantic Avenue ( train)	Wyckoff Avenue/Cypress Avenue (Queens), Cooper Street/Decatur Street, Bushwick Avenue
B116	train	Prospect Park ( trains)	↔	Atlantic Avenue-Barclays Center ( trains)	Flatbush Avenue
L90	train	Myrtle–Wyckoff Avenues ( trains)	↔	Lorimer Street ( trains)	Wyckoff Avenue, Bushwick Avenue, Metropolitan Avenue
M90	train	Myrtle Avenue-Broadway ( trains)	↔	Metropolitan Avenue-Middle Village, Queens ( train)	Myrtle Avenue, Fresh Pond Road, Metropolitan Avenue
T403	train	Bedford-Nostrand Avenues ( train)	↔	Court Square, Queens ( trains)	Union Avenue, Manhattan Avenue, Jackson Avenue
T410	train	Marcy Avenue ( trains)	↔	Metropolitan Avenue-Middle Village, Queens ( train)	Broadway, Myrtle Avenue, Fresh Pond Road, Metropolitan Avenue
T422	train	Marcy Avenue ( trains)	↺	Bedford Avenue ( train)	Broadway, Union Avenue, Driggs Avenue; Counterclockwise loop in Williamsburg
T426	Local Service				
T426	Express Service				
T426	train	Rockaway Parkway ( train)	↔	Broadway Junction ( trains)	Local: Snediker Avenue/Junius Street; Express: Pennsylvania Avenue, Glenwood Road/Flatlands Avenue
T430	Local Service				
T430	Express Service				
T430	train	Myrtle Avenue-Broadway ( trains)	↔	Crescent Street ( train)	Local: Broadway, Ridgewood Avenue/Atlantic Avenue; Express: Bushwick Avenue, Jamaica Avenue/Atlantic Avenue
T432	train	Myrtle Avenue-Broadway ( trains)	↔	Essex Street, Manhattan ( trains)	Broadway, Delancey Street
T433	train	Broadway Junction ( trains)	↔	Marcy Avenue ( trains)	Broadway
T434	train	Broadway Junction ( trains)	↔	Crescent Street ( train)	Jamaica and Ridgewood Avenues/Atlantic Avenue
T440	Local Service				
T440	Express Service				
T440	train	Utica Avenue ( trains)	↔	Jay Street-Metrotech ( trains)	Fulton Street (local) or Atlantic Avenue (express), Livingston Street; Local buses also stop at Fulton Street station.
T464	Local Service				
T464	Express Service				
T464	train	Prospect Park ( trains)	↔	Kings Highway train)	Local service via Ocean Avenue; All local buses terminate at Kings Highway
T464	train	Prospect Park ( trains)	↔	Coney Island-Stillwell Avenue ( trains)	Express service; No stops between Prospect Park and Kings Highway; bypassed via Coney Island Avenue; Makes all stops south of Kings Highway via Ocean Avenue

=== Route B110 ===
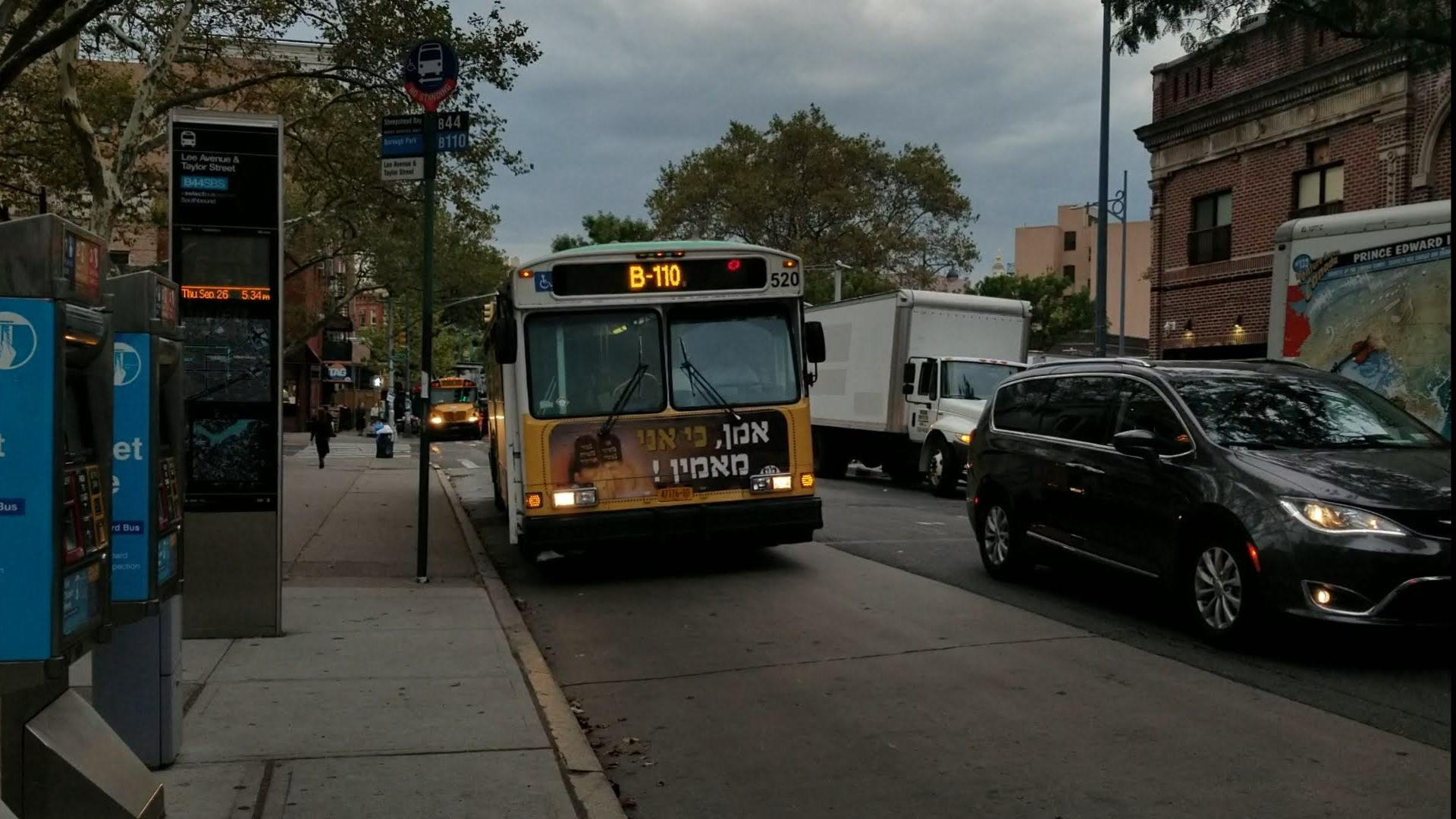
A B110 bus in Williamsburg, Brooklyn in 2019

This route is operated by Private Transportation Corporation under a franchise with the City of New York, and is the only unsubsidized route operating in Brooklyn. Buses on the B110 route do not accept MetroCard or OMNY, instead charging a one-way exact change fare of US$5.00.

In October 2011, the B110 was reported in several New York newspapers to have signs requiring female passengers to sit in the back to avoid possible contact with men, as is considered necessary by some Hasidic Jewish groups in the area it serves. The story was reported internationally. On October 20, the New York City Department of Transportation said it would shut down the line if the gender separation was not discontinued, and six days later, Private Transportation Corporation agreed to end this practice.

As of 2013, Private Transportation Corporation no longer enforces the Hasidic custom that men and women sit apart in social situations. Still, most Hasidic men and women riders choose to sit apart from each other, and do not complain about segregation.

Route	Terminals			Primary streets traveled	Service operation and notes
B110	Borough Park; 18th Avenue and 49th Street	↔	Williamsburg; Lee Avenue and Taylor Street	49th Street/50th Street, Bedford Avenue/Lee Avenue	No service from 2 hours prior to sundown on Friday until nightfall Saturday due to Shabbat.; Operates nonstop via Fort Hamilton Parkway, Prospect Expressway, and Brooklyn-Queens Expressway

=== Dollar vans ===
When the MTA discontinued some routes on June 27, 2010, operators of commuter vans, also known as dollar vans, were allowed to take over certain discontinued routes. In Brooklyn, these routes were the B23, B39 (which has since been restored), and B71. There are also dollar vans that operate to areas with little mass transit service, or provide an alternative mode of transportation to certain bus routes such as the B41 and B46. The vans, some licensed by the New York City Taxi and Limousine Commission and some unlicensed, charge a fare of $2, lower than the $3 fare for MTA-operated local buses, but without free transfers.

== Route history ==
=== Routes B1 to B39 ===
Route	History
B1	Sheepshead Bay area bus began in April 1919 by Plum Beach Auto Stage.; 86th Street Line streetcar until August 12, 1948.; 86th Street portion and Bay Ridge Avenue portion of B1 (west of 25th Avenue) were B34 until 1978.; Service via Brighton Beach was B21 until 1978.; Service originally ran via the Sheepshead Bay (BMT Brighton Line) station. Service was rerouted via Brighton Beach and Coney Island Hospital in 1978, absorbing the B21 and B34.; Western end (13th Avenue and 86th Street) swapped with the B64 in 2010.; Current routing originally proposed in the 1970s as B86.; Articulated buses debuted on June 28, 2020.
B2	Began 1922 by Kings Coach Company.; Bus service temporarily served Mill Basin, ending on October 28, 1979 to serve former Pioneer Bus Company riders. It was discontinued once that route was taken over by Command Bus Company.; Overnight service discontinued in 1995 due to budget crisis.; Weekend service discontinued in June 2010 due to a second budget crisis and restored in mid-2012.
B3	Began 1922 by Kings Coach Company.; Extended along 25th Avenue in 1978.; Service via East 73rd and 74th Streets in Bergen Beach discontinued in June 2010.
B4	Began September 28, 1931 by Brooklyn-Manhattan Transit.; Eastern terminus was Stillwell Avenue and 86th Street until 1978.; Emmons Avenue portion was B21 until 1978.; Extended to Sheepshead Bay in 1978, via Coney Island Hospital and along B36 and B21 routes.; Off-peak service east of Coney Island Hospital discontinued on June 27, 2010, restored in January 2013.; Service on Neptune Avenue discontinued in 2010, restored January 6, 2013.
B6	Bay Parkway bus began August 24, 1931 by Brooklyn-Manhattan Transit.; Cozine Avenue service was new route in 1968 as B84.; On May 10, 1987, as a part of a series of changes to B6 and B11 bus service, with the shortening of the B11 to Brooklyn College, a third-leg transfer would be introduced between the B6 and B11 to ensure that riders would not have to pay a second fare. In addition, B6 service was rerouted to Glenwood Road from Flatlands Avenue between East 103rd Street and Rockaway Parkway, and eastbound service was rerouted to stay on Avenue H and Ralph Avenue instead of East 56th Street and Farragut Road. Weekday and Saturday service operating only between Cozine Avenue and Ashford Street and Rockaway Parkway station was increased.; Original eastern terminus was Ashford Street; extended along Ashford Street in 1989.; In May 2000, the MTA announced a plan to implement limited-stop service along the route on weekdays westbound between 7 a.m. and 8 p.m. and eastbound between 6 a.m. and 7 p.m.. The change was expected to save $95,000 a year. Limited-stop buses would skip local stops between Rockaway Parkway station and Coney Island Avenue, and make all stops to the east and to the west. While limited-stop service would operate, about every other B6 would run limited. Local bus service would mainly operate between Rockaway Parkway station and Coney Island Avenue. The service began on September 11, 2000, saving up to five minutes in travel time.
B7	Began June 29, 1930 by Brooklyn-Manhattan Transit.; On September 13, 1999, service was extended along Kings Highway from East 16th Street to Coney Island Avenue. Partially as a result of the extension, ridership increased by 15.4 percent between September 1999 and May 2000 over the previous year, compared to 4.5 percent for buses in Brooklyn overall.; In February 2001, the MTA announced a plan to extend weekend service between 8 a.m. to 8 p.m. from Ryder Street to Coney Island. The extension would cost about $120,000, and was to be implemented in June 2001.; On November 10, 2005, to improve traffic flow on Kings Highway, bus stops at Linden Boulevard and Remsen Avenue were moved to the service road from the main road.; Overnight service discontinued on June 27, 2010.
B8	Began on October 22, 1925 by Queens Bus Lines.; Original eastern terminus was the Brooklyn Terminal Market.; On January 15, 1950, service was extended by 0.5 miles (0.80 km) from Ditmas Avenue and Remsen Avenue to East 83rd Street and Foster Avenue to serve the Brooklyn Terminal Market.; Most trips were rerouted to Brookdale Hospital in the 1990s.; Brooklyn Terminal Market service was discontinued on June 23, 1996.; Daytime service between Bay Ridge and Veterans Administration Hospital discontinued in 2010 but restored on June 29, 2014.; Service was extended to Bay Ridge-95th Street on June 29, 2014.
B9	Began on October 28, 1931 by Brooklyn-Manhattan Transit.; B9 service, along with B46 service, was extended to Jacob Riis Park in Rockaway, Queens, starting on June 14, 1980. Service would run every 30 minutes between 8 a.m. and 7 p.m., and when the service was announced on June 10, 1980, it was expected that service would be increased as ridership increased. The extensions in service were made possible via federal funding from the Gateway National Recreational Area.
B11	Began on September 21, 1931 by Brooklyn-Manhattan Transit.; Original eastern terminus was 18th Avenue; Extended to Canarsie–Rockaway Parkway station on November 12, 1978 via the B6 route.; On May 10, 1987, as a part of a series of changes to B6 and B11 bus service, the route was shortened to the current terminus at Brooklyn College. As part of the change, late night service was extended from 18th Avenue to Brooklyn College. A third-leg transfer would be introduced between the B6 and B11 to ensure that riders would not have to pay a second fare.; Overnight service discontinued on September 10, 1995 due to a budget crisis.
B12	Began November 23, 1931 by Brooklyn-Manhattan Transit.; Service originally ran to City Line (Sheridan Avenue and Liberty Avenue); On June 11, 1954, a public hearing was held on a proposed modification to the route to provide more convenient service to the Kings County Hospital Center from Bedford-Stuyvesant.; The route was cut back to Broadway Junction in July 2010.
B13	Began on October 25, 1921 by Independent Buses.; Original route ran on Crescent Street from Jamaica Avenue to Spring Creek Basin.; Merged with the (first) B19 route on May 1, 1938, extended to Ridgewood Terminal some time later, probably in 1947.; Merged with most of the B18 route on September 8, 2002. B18 service along Cypress Avenue between the Ridgewood Terminal and Cypress Hills was discontinued. In Williamsburg, the B13 ran on Bushwick Avenue instead of Morgan and Porter Avenues. In Spring Creek, the B13 ran on Eldert Lane instead of Crescent Street between Linden Boulevard and Stanley Avenue. Most of the B18 merge/extension was cut back to Wyckoff Heights Hospital in 2010.; Extended to new bus terminal at Gateway Center North on August 31, 2014.
B14	Began in August 1925 by Eastern Parkway, Brownsville and East New York Transit Relief Association.; Service was extended along Eldert Lane and Stanley Avenue to the Spring Creek Post Office on July 2, 2006.
B15	Sumner Avenue Line streetcar until July 20, 1947.; New Lots Avenue Line streetcar until September 1, 1947.; Became route B10 before being renumbered to B15 in 1993 when extended to JFK Airport to avoid confusion with Q10.; On February 12, 2006, the bus stop at Federal Circle was removed, and service was rerouted to Lefferts Boulevard AirTrain Station B, to improve pedestrian and traffic safety.; On May 30, 2012 service was rerouted from Terminal 4 to Terminal 5 due to construction.; Service to Brooklyn General Mail Facility discontinued in September 2013. Trips making short turns now terminate at Drew Street and Linden Boulevard.; All JFK service was cut back from Terminal 5 to Lefferts Blvd Airtrain Station on March 27, 2022, with service within JFK replaced by the Q3 and JFK AirTrain.
B16	Began on October 28, 1931 by Brooklyn-Manhattan Transit.; In September 1994, the route was extended 0.6 miles (0.97 km) north via Ocean Avenue to Flatbush Avenue and Empire Boulevard to provide direct connections with the B41, B47 and B48. This change also eliminated the need for the route to turnaround using Saint Paul's Place, which is a narrow one-way street that is often blocked due to congestion and extensive road repairs, which resulted in unreliable service. Northbound buses had turned north on St. Paul's Place and east on Parkside Avenue to the terminal on Ocean Avenue. The extension cost $140,000 annually, of which it was offset by $70,000 to $85,000 due to expected increases in ridership. This was funded as part of the 1994 Fare Deal/Ridership Growth Initiatives Program.; Overnight service discontinued in 1995 due to budget crisis.
B17	Began on August 17, 1931 by Brooklyn-Manhattan Transit.; On January 12, 1998, service was increased to begin earlier and end later.
B20	Began on November 30, 1931 by Brooklyn-Manhattan Transit.; In May 1936, service was extended along Pennsylvania Avenue to Linden Boulevard.; Operated via Linden Boulevard between Pennsylvania Avenue and Eldert Lane until 1978.; Rerouted in 1978 from Linden Boulevard to serve the Boulevard and Linden Houses via Wortman Avenue between Pennsylvania Avenue and Ashford Street.
B24	Calvary Cemetery Line (Greenpoint Avenue) streetcar until January 26, 1930.; Meeker and Marcy Avenues Line streetcar until April 17, 1939.; Weekend service discontinued in June 2010, restored January 6, 2013.
B25	Fulton Street Line streetcar until August 10, 1941.; In September 1996, B25 service was made 24/7 to make up for the truncation of B41 service to Tillary Street. B25 service had run 24 hours on weekdays and Saturday, but not Sundays when the first trip departed at 7:40 a.m.; Extended to Fulton Landing in 1998.; On January 12, 1998, westbound service was rerouted along Front Street, Main Street, Water Street and Fulton Street between 7 a.m. and 7 p.m. on weekdays to stop at the corner of Water Street and Main Street.
B26	Putnam Avenue Line streetcar until February 5, 1950.; In January 1995, the B26 was extended from Adams Street and Johnson Street to a new terminal at Cadman Plaza West and Tilllary Street to eliminate operational problems.
B31	Began in 1922 by Kings Coach Company.; Former western terminus was Avenue U (BMT Brighton Line) station.; Rerouted to the B2 western terminus (Kings Highway (BMT Brighton Line)) station in 1989. A public hearing was held on June 22, 1989. The change was made to provide a direct connection to Kings Highway, which had more subway service as it was an express stop. The extension also allowed for connections to the B5, B7 and B50. Two alternatives were considered to extend the route. The first would have extended it north along Gerritsen Avenue to Avenue R and then follow the B2 to Kings Highway. The second alternative would have kept the route along Avenue U to Ocean Avenue before turning north to Avenue R and then running along the B2 route. The first alternative was chosen as it was the more direct route, had fewer bus transfer impacts, and provided additional service along Gerritsen Avenue.; Overnight service discontinued in 2010.
B32	New route started on September 8, 2013.
B35	Church Avenue Line streetcar until October 31, 1956.; Limited-stop service implemented in June 2005.; Articulated buses debuted on August 22, 2018.
B36	Sea Gate Line streetcar until December 1, 1946.; Originally ran in Sea Gate (via a separate bus) until 1978.; Originally ran via Neptune Avenue. Service was rerouted via Coney Island Hospital in 1978.
B37	Traveled on Livingston Street, Third Avenue; Third Avenue Line streetcar until March 1, 1942.; In January 1995, the B37 began running via Livingston Street in Downtown Brooklyn instead of via the Fulton Mall due to the high accident rate on that street and due to the difficult turns required to get to Fulton Mall.; On November 8, 2008, Bay Ridge-bound service was rerouted from Third Avenue to Fourth Avenue between Flatbush Avenue and Bergen Street.; Discontinued on June 27, 2010 due to a budget crisis. Restored on June 29, 2014.; The route between Court Street and Livingston Street in Downtown Brooklyn (original northern terminus) and Atlantic Avenue-Barclays Center was not restored.
B38	DeKalb Avenue Line streetcar until January 30, 1949.; Current Metropolitan Avenue branch used to terminate at Stanhope Street and Onderdonk Avenue.; Limited-stop service was added on April 7, 2008.; Articulated buses debuted on September 1, 2019.
B39	Williamsburg Bridge Local streetcar until December 4, 1948.; For five months beginning on May 1, 1999, no fare was collected due to the Williamsburg Bridge subway reconstruction.; Discontinued on June 27, 2010 due to a budget crisis.; Daytime service restored on January 6, 2013.

=== Routes B41 to B103 ===
Route	History
B41	This route was the Flatbush Avenue Line streetcar until March 5, 1951.; Former northern terminus was Furman Street and Cadman Plaza West; Limited-stop service began on September 14, 1992.; In September 1996, all trips on the route were slated to be cut back to the alternate terminal at Tillary Street and Cadman Plaza West from Old Fulton Street at Fulton Landing as part of a reconfiguration of service in Downtown Brooklyn. The change took effect on March 30, 1997. This 0.6 miles (0.97 km) section was eliminated as it duplicated B25 service, because this section was underutilized, with an average of 1.5 passengers per trip, and because the shorter route would increase the B41's reliability. B25 service was made 24/7 to make up for the loss of Sunday service to Fulton Landing.; In February 1999, the MTA announced plans to implement Sunday limited-stop service on the B41, B44, and B46 due to increased ridership. The $76,000 annual increase in costs was expected to be offset by increased ridership. The change was expected to be implemented in May 1999.
B42	Rockaway Parkway Line streetcar until April 29, 1951.; Northern terminus (bus loop) sits next to the Rockaway Parkway station and is outside subway fare control.
B43	Tompkins Avenue Line streetcar until August 24, 1947.; Graham Avenue Line streetcar until December 21, 1948.; Combined from B47 and B62 on September 10, 1995 due to a budget crisis.; In March 2000, plans were announced to modify the terminal loops of the B43 and B48 to serve the Lincoln Road entrance to the Prospect Park subway station to eliminate a two-block walk and allow dispatchers and bus operators to use the new dispatcher office and restrooms at the subway station. At the time, buses had terminated at Washington Avenue and Empire Boulevard; the southbound stop was on Washington Avenue, and buses continued via Flatbush Avenue to head back into service on Empire Boulevard. With the change, southbound buses would turn south onto Flatbush Avenue, and west on Lincoln Road to the new terminal, and northbound buses would continue west on Lincoln Road, turn north on Ocean Avenue, and turn east onto Empire Boulevard. The change was estimated to cost $37,000 a year, and was to be implemented in June 2000.
B44	Nostrand Avenue Line streetcar until April 1, 1951.; Limited-stop service was added to the route on September 11, 1995, operating on weekdays between 6:30 a.m. and 9 p.m. and on Saturday between 7 a.m. and 7 p.m.; In February 1999, the MTA announced plans to implement Sunday limited-stop service on the B41, B44, and B46 due to increased ridership. The $76,000 annual increase in costs was expected to be offset by increased ridership. The change was expected to be implemented in May 1999.; Articulated buses debuted on January 24, 2013.; First Select Bus Service bus rapid transit route in Brooklyn started on November 17, 2013.
B45	St. Johns Place Line streetcar until August 24, 1947.
B46	Utica and Reid Avenues Line streetcar until March 18, 1951.; B46 service, along with B9 service, was extended to Jacob Riis Park in Queens during the summer season, starting on June 14, 1980. Service would run every 30 minutes between 8 a.m. and 7 p.m., and when the service was announced on June 10, 1980, it was expected that service would be increased as ridership increased. The extensions in service were made possible via federal funding from the Gateway National Recreational Area.; Limited-stop service was implemented on weekdays September 12, 1994.; Saturday limited-stop service was added on September 16, 1995, operating between 8 a.m. and 8 p.m.; In February 1999, the MTA announced plans to implement Sunday limited-stop service on the B41, B44, and B46 due to increased ridership. The $76,000 annual increase in costs was expected to be offset by increased ridership. The change was expected to be implemented in May 1999.; Busiest bus route in Brooklyn; third busiest route in New York City.; Second Select Bus Service bus rapid transit route in Brooklyn started on July 3, 2016. Local service was extended full-time to Williamsburg Bridge Plaza.; Articulated buses debuted on January 19, 2020 for B46 SBS.
B47	Ralph Avenue Line streetcar until November 1, 1943.; Ralph and Rockaway Avenues Line streetcar until May 27, 1951.; Created as a result of a merge of the B40 and B78 on September 8, 2002.; Former route B40 service east of Ralph Avenue and north of Woodhull Hospital discontinued.
B48	Franklin Avenue Line streetcar until October 28, 1945.; Lorimer Street Line streetcar until December 14, 1947.; In March 2000, plans were announced to modify the terminal loops of the B43 and B48 to serve the Lincoln Road entrance to the Prospect Park subway station to eliminate a two-block walk and allow dispatchers and bus operators to use the new dispatcher office and restrooms at the subway station. At the time, buses had terminated at Washington Avenue and Empire Boulevard; the southbound stop was on Washington Avenue, and buses continued via Flatbush Avenue to head back into service on Empire Boulevard. With the change, southbound buses would turn south onto Flatbush Avenue, and west on Lincoln Road to the new terminal, and northbound buses would continue west on Lincoln Road, turn north on Ocean Avenue, and turn east onto Empire Boulevard. The change was estimated to cost $37,000 a year, and was to be implemented in June 2000.; Route originally continued to Lefferts Gardens; service south of Fulton Street discontinued in July 2010, restored on January 6, 2013.
B49	Ocean Avenue Line streetcar until April 29, 1951.; Rerouted to serve the Sheepshead Bay subway station on November 12, 1978 (when B1 was rerouted via Brighton Beach).; In April 2002, plans were announced to reroute northbound B49 service off of Sheepshead Bay Road and East 15th Street, and onto Shore Parkway Service Road, East 16th Street, Voorhies Avenue, East 14th Street, and Avenue Z, to reduce the number of crashes on the bus routes. 15 crashes involving the B49 occurred in 1999, eight occurred in 2000, and seven in 2001.; Southbound Limited-Stop service started on September 5, 2006.
B52	Greene and Gates Avenues Line streetcar until October 5, 1941.; The B52 was rerouted to run two-way on Gates Avenue between Spring 1991 and October 1993 to accommodate the reconstruction of Greene Avenue and Quincy Street, which was subsequently deferred. The B52 returned to running eastbound on Quincy Street and Linden Street and running westbound on Gates Avenue. The local community then requested reinstating two-way service via Gates Avenue because the street was wider, there was less congestion, and because there were greater housing development densities on that street. Brooklyn Community Boards 2, 3 and 4 supported the change, and a public hearing was held on June 16, 1994. The change went into effect in January 1995.
B54	Myrtle Avenue Line (surface) streetcar until July 17, 1949.; On July 1, 2007, the travel path of the B54's terminal loop in Downtown Brooklyn was reversed to improve traffic flow and to provide faster service to the Jay Street subway station.
B57	Flushing Avenue Line streetcar until November 21, 1948.; Court Street Line streetcar until July 17, 1949.; Smith Street Line (surface) streetcar until February 11, 1951.; In September 1996, B57 service was slated to be extended 0.7 miles (1.1 km) west to the center of Downtown Brooklyn at Smith Street at Livingston Street via Jay Street from its previous terminal at Sands Street and Jay Street. The extension was intended to encourage ridership growth by providing direct access to Downtown Brooklyn, to provide transfers to other routes and to create a common terminal with the B51, B57 and B65. In addition, the B57's route path was revised to loop around the Farragut House, running along York Street between Navy Street and Gold Street, to make up for the loss of the B61, which was rerouted. Service was extended to Fulton Mall on March 30, 1997.; Extended along the Smith/Court Street sections of the B75 in 2010.; Extended to Red Hook in January 2013 from Smith-9th Streets subway station.
B60	Wilson Avenue Line streetcar until May 27, 1951.; Fare-free service for six to 12 months started on September 24, 2023, and ended August 31, 2024.
B61	Columbia Street and Van Brunt Street portion part of Crosstown Line (Brooklyn surface) streetcar until January 27, 1951.; Lorraine and Ninth Street route begun August 27, 1936 by Brooklyn-Manhattan Transit.; Originally ran between Red Hook and Long Island City, Queens.; Extended to Queens Plaza in March 1994 from the base of the Pulaski Bridge as part of the MTA's Fare Deal program.; In September 1996, the B61 was slated to be rerouted, eliminating the deviation it made along Sands Street, Gold Street, York Street and Navy Street to serve the Farragut Houses, instead running directly along Tillary Street. The change was to be done so buses could avoid traffic on Jay Street and Sands Street, which is the entrance to the Brooklyn-Queens Expressway and the Brooklyn Bridge and to enhance the route's growing use as an interborough route between Downtown Brooklyn and Long Island City. This change saved riders five minutes in each direction. B57 service was to be rerouted to maintain service to the Farragut Houses. On March 30, 1997, service was rerouted off of Jay Street and Sands Street and onto Gold Street and Tillary Street.; On June 15, 2008, service was extended to the new IKEA store in Red Hook.; Route north of Downtown Brooklyn was split off from original B61 route (now B62) on January 3, 2010.; Extended along former B77 route and Ninth Street portion of B75 route in 2010.; Second bus route in Brooklyn to receive MTA BusTime due to Culver subway line reconstruction project in 2012.
B62	Crosstown Line (Brooklyn surface) streetcar until January 27, 1951.; Split off from original B61 route on January 3, 2010.; Terminal moved from Queensboro Plaza to Astoria on August 31, 2025 in conjunction with Phase Two of the Queens Bus Redesign.
B63	Fifth Avenue Line (Brooklyn surface) streetcar until February 20, 1949.; First bus route in New York City in February 2011 to test tracking real time arrival system called MTA BusTime.
B64	Bay Ridge Avenue Line streetcar until May 15, 1949.; Bay Ridge Avenue and 86th Street portion of B1 were B34 until November 12, 1978.; Western end (13th Avenue and 86th Street) swapped with B1 in July 2010.; Southern terminus was originally Coney Island; Service was cut back to Bath Beach in July 2010, restored on January 6, 2013.
B65	Bergen Street Line streetcar until July 20, 1947.; Rerouted from Cobble Hill to Downtown Brooklyn in the late 1990s.
B67	Seventh Avenue Line (Brooklyn surface) streetcar until February 11, 1951.; Extended into South Williamsburg via the Brooklyn Navy Yard and Vinegar Hill on September 9, 2013.
B68	Coney Island Avenue Line streetcar until November 30, 1955.; Service originally terminated at West 5th Street. Extended to Coney Island–Stillwell Avenue subway station in July 2001.
B69	Vanderbilt Avenue Line streetcar until August 20, 1950.; Southern portion (south of Flatbush Avenue) originally ran via 8th Avenue and Prospect Park West in Park Slope and terminated at 19th Street. This portion was rerouted along the B67 route (7th Avenue) and extended to Kensington in July 2010.; Weekend service discontinued in July 2010 and restored on January 6, 2013.
B70	Eighth Avenue Line (Brooklyn surface) streetcar until May 15, 1949.; Rerouted from 7th Avenue to 3rd Avenue in Bay Ridge in July 2010 to replace B37 service.; Rerouted back to 7th Avenue from 3rd Avenue in Bay Ridge on June 29, 2014 due to restored B37 service.
B74	Norton's Point Line streetcar until November 7, 1948.; The span of evening service was extended on January 11, 1998.
B82	Western portion (B5; west of Flatbush Avenue) begun August 29, 1924 by Queens Bus Lines.; Eastern portion (B50) introduced in 1975 from Starrett City to Canarsie–Rockaway Parkway; extended to Coney Island Avenue in Midwood on November 12, 1978.; Combined from routes B5 and B50 on September 10, 1995 due to budget crisis.; Original terminus was Cropsey Avenue and Canal Avenue. Extended to Coney Island on September 7, 2003.; Rush Hour Limited-Stop Service added on September 13, 2010.; Third Select Bus Service bus rapid transit route in Brooklyn started on October 1, 2018. Runs only on weekdays, service to Coney Island and on weekends is provided by the B82 local.
B83	New route, started on February 27, 1966 on a six-month trial basis.; Original northern terminus was Livonia Avenue and Pennsylvania Avenue; The route's original southern terminus was Cozine Avenue and Schenck Avenue.; On November 13, 1966, the route was extended five blocks from Schenck Avenue and Cozine Avenue to Ashford Street and Cozine Avenue to serve the Boulevard Houses development.; Rerouted along Van Siclen Avenue and into Spring Creek Towers in 1978.; Extended to Gateway Mall via Pennsylvania Avenue and the Belt Parkway on November 18, 2007.; Extended to new bus terminal at Gateway Center North on August 31, 2014.
B84	New route created on June 30, 2013.; Services part of original B83 route in East New York between Jerome Street and Berriman Street.
B100	Began on February 3, 1960 by Pioneer Bus Company.; Extended from Bassett Avenue to 56th Drive (then called McMullen Drive) in August 1960.; Formerly operated by the Command Bus Company until MTA takeover in December 2005, then operated by MTA Bus Company.
B103	Began service June 2, 1986.; Formerly operated by Command Bus Company.; Former terminus at East 94th Street and Flatlands Avenue and requested trips to Cozine Avenue and Ashford Street.; Formerly operated by the Command Bus Company until MTA takeover in December 2005, then operated by MTA Bus Company.; Saturday service was added in 2006.; On November 8, 2008, Canarsie-bound service was rerouted from Third Avenue to Fourth Avenue between Flatbush Avenue and Bergen Street.; Rerouted and extended to Williams Avenue on May 4, 2009 and Sunday service was added on September 6, 2009.; Expanded service and extra trips between Brooklyn College and Canarsie was added on weekdays in 2009, Saturdays in 2010, and Sundays in 2012.; Gowanus and Boerum Hill service was added on April 6, 2014.

== Proposed bus route changes ==
In December 2019, the MTA released a draft redesign of the Queens bus network with 77 routes. The final redesign was initially expected in mid- or late 2020, but the first draft attracted overwhelmingly negative feedback, with 11,000 comments about the plans. The redesign was delayed due to the COVID-19 pandemic in New York City. Planning resumed in mid-2021. The original draft plan was dropped, and a revised plan with 85 routes was released on March 29, 2022.

The MTA released a draft plan for Brooklyn's bus network on December 1, 2022. One bus route (the B39) remained completely unchanged, while the remaining routes underwent changes to their route, stop spacing, service frequencies, and/or service spans.

For a list of changes to Queens bus routes, see List of bus routes in Queens § Proposed bus route changes. The Queens Bus Redesign Final Plan affects the B57 and B62 in Queens: those changes went into effect on August 31, 2025.

Routes marked with an asterisk (*) are proposed to run 24 hours a day. For rush routes, streets with nonstop sections are notated in italics.

Route	Terminals			Primary streets traveled	Route Type	Notes
B1*	Bay Ridge; 4th Avenue and 87th Street at 86th Street ( train)	↔	Manhattan Beach; Mackenzie Street and Oriental Boulevard at Kingsborough Community College	86th Street, Brighton Beach Avenue	Local	Only changes to existing route are to stop spacing.
B3*	Bath Beach; Harway Avenue and 25th Avenue	↔	Bergen Beach; East 71st Street and Avenue U	Avenue U	Local	Only changes to existing route are to stop spacing.
B4	Bay Ridge; Narrows Avenue and 77th Street	↔	Sheepshead Bay; Knapp Street and Voorhies Avenue	Bay Ridge Parkway, Stillwell Avenue, Neptune Avenue	Local	Service straightened in Coney Island.
B5	Bath Beach; Cropsey Avenue and Bay 37th Street	↔	Gateway Center Mall	Bay Parkway, Avenue J, Flatlands Avenue, Cozine Avenue	Limited	New route paralleling the B6 Limited and replacing the B84, with a branch to Gateway Center.
B6*	Bath Beach; Cropsey Avenue and Bay 37th Street	↔	Canarsie; Rockaway Parkway ( train)	Bay Parkway, Avenue J, Flatlands Avenue	Local	Eastern part of route truncated.; Service straightened in Flatlands.; Extended to New Lots Avenue ( train) when Limited service is not running.
B6 LTD	Bath Beach; Cropsey Avenue and Bay 37th Street	↔	East New York; Livonia Avenue and Warwick Street at New Lots Avenue ( train)	Bay Parkway, Avenue J, Flatlands Avenue, Cozine Avenue	Limited	Service straightened in Flatlands.; Service added on Sunday to replace the B6 local and the B84.
B7	Midwood; Quentin Road and Coney Island Avenue	↔	Ridgewood, Queens; Putnam Avenue and Fairview Avenue at Forest Avenue ( train)	Saratoga Avenue, Kings Highway, Cooper Street and Avenue, Fresh Pond Road	Local	Northern part of route extended to Ridgewood via Glendale, Queens, replacing the B13 and B20.
B8*	Brownsville; Hegeman Avenue and Rockaway Avenue	↔	Bay Ridge; 4th Avenue and 95th Street at 95th Street ( train)	Avenue D, 18th Avenue, Cropsey Avenue	Local	Service straightened in Brownsville.
B9	Bay Ridge; Shore Road and MacKay Place	↔	Kings Plaza Shopping Center; Avenue U and Flatbush Avenue	60th Street, Avenue M, Avenue L, Flatbush Avenue	Local	Only changes to existing route are to stop spacing.
B10	Prospect Lefferts Gardens; Flatbush Avenue and Lincoln Road at Prospect Park ( trains)	↔	East New York; East New York Avenue and Alabama Avenue at Alabama Avenue ( trains)	Empire Boulevard, East New York Avenue	Limited	New route largely duplicating existing B12 and B43.
B11	Brooklyn Army Terminal; 1st Avenue and 58th Street	↔	Flatbush; Flatbush Avenue and Nostrand Avenue at Flatbush Avenue ( trains)	50th Street (eastbound)/49th Street (westbound); Avenue J	Local	Service straightened at west end.
B12*	Prospect Lefferts Gardens; Ocean Avenue and Parkside Avenue at Parkside Avenue ( train)	↔	East New York; East New York Avenue and Alabama Avenue at Alabama Avenue ( trains)	Clarkson Avenue, East New York Avenue	Local	Only changes to existing route are to stop spacing.
B13*	Gateway Center Mall	↔	Bushwick; Wyckoff Avenue and DeKalb Avenue at DeKalb Avenue ( train), Wyckoff Hospital	Fountain Avenue, Crescent Street, Cypress Avenue, Wyckoff Avenue	Local	Straightened throughout much of its route to avoid Spring Creek and Glendale, Queens.
B14*	Crown Heights; Utica Avenue and Eastern Parkway at Utica Avenue ( trains)	↔	Brooklyn General Mail Facility	Pitkin Avenue, Sutter Avenue	Local	Eastern part of route modified to replace B13 and provide a connection to the Euclid Avenue station.
B15*	East Williamsburg; Bushwick Avenue and Montrose Avenue at Montrose Avenue ( train)	↔	East New York; Linden Boulevard and Drew Street	Bushwick Avenue; Marcus Garvey Boulevard (eastbound)/Throop Avenue (westbound); East 98th Street, New Lots Avenue	Local	Western part of route extended to provide a connection to the Montrose Avenue station.; JFK Airport branch discontinued, replaced by B55 Crosstown or B55 SBS.
B16	Bay Ridge; Shore Road and 4th Avenue	↔	Crown Heights; Clarkson Avenue and Utica Avenue	Fort Hamilton Parkway; 14th Avenue (northbound)/13th Avenue (southbound); Caton Avenue, Clarkson Avenue	Local	Eastern section rerouted to serve Kings County Hospital Center and Kingsbrook Jewish Medical Center.; Sunset Park section rerouted to use wider streets.
B17*	Crown Heights; Eastern Parkway and Utica Avenue at Utica Avenue ( trains)	↔	Canarsie; East 108th Street and Seaview Avenue	Remsen Avenue, Seaview Avenue	Local	Part-time service via the Canarsie–Rockaway Parkway station to East 80th Street discontinued (replaced by B76).
B20	Brooklyn General Mail Facility	↔	East New York; Broadway and Fulton Street at Broadway Junction ( trains)	Linden Boulevard, Stanley Avenue, Pennsylvania Avenue	Rush	Northern section truncated.; Southern section rerouted to avoid Wortman Avenue and Eldert Lane.; Local service along Pennsylvania Avenue provided by B83.
B25*	Fulton Landing; Front Street and York Street	↔	East New York; Jamaica Avenue and Alabama Avenue at Alabama Avenue ( trains)	Fulton Street	Local	No changes to daytime routing except for stop spacing.; No overnight service west of the Franklin Avenue station, use the B26.
B26*	Downtown Brooklyn; Cadman Plaza West and Tillary Street	↔	Ridgewood Intermodal Terminal at Myrtle–Wyckoff Avenues ( trains)	Fulton Street, Halsey Street	Rush	Rerouted to avoid Putnam Avenue.; Local service overnight between Cadman Plaza and Franklin Avenue, all other times Fulton Street local service provided by B25.
B27	Vinegar Hill; Gold Street and York Street	↔	Red Hook; Beard Street and Otsego Street at Ikea Terminal	Court Street/Smith Street	Local	New route taking over southern part of B57 and Vinegar Hill section of B62.
B31	Midwood; Quentin Road and East 16th Street at Kings Highway ( trains)	↔	Gerritsen Beach; Gerritsen Avenue and Lois Avenue	Avenue R, Gerritsen Avenue	Local	Only changes to existing route are to stop spacing.
B35*	Brownsville; Watson Street and Hegeman Avenue	↔	Sunset Park; 1st Avenue and 39th Street	Church Avenue, 39th Street	Local	Similar to existing nighttime service, but runs to Sunset Park during the day.; B35 LTD service replaced by B55 Crosstown or B55 SBS.
B36*	Sea Gate; West 37th Street and Surf Avenue	↔	Sheepshead Bay; Gravesend Neck Road and Nostrand Avenue	Surf Avenue, Avenue Z	Local	Only changes to existing route are to stop spacing.
B37	Fort Hamilton; Shore Road and 4th Avenue	↔	Boerum Hill; 4th Avenue and Dean Street at Atlantic Avenue–Barclays Center ( trains)	3rd Avenue	Local	Only changes to existing route are to stop spacing.
B38*	Downtown Brooklyn; Cadman Plaza West and Tillary Street	↔	Ridgewood, Queens; Seneca Avenue and Cornelia Street	DeKalb Avenue (eastbound)/Lafayette Avenue (westbound)	Local	Metropolitan Avenue branch discontinued.; On remaining Seneca Avenue branch, only changes are to stop spacing.; B38 LTD discontinued due to increased stop spacing.
B39	Williamsburg Bridge Plaza; Lane 1	↔	Lower East Side, Manhattan; Delancey Street and Allen Street	Delancey Street	Local	No changes.
B40*	Prospect Lefferts Gardens; Lincoln Road and Flatbush Avenue at Prospect Park ( trains)	↔	Bergen Beach; East 71st Street and Veterans Avenue	Flatbush Avenue, Avenue N	Rush	New route replacing Bergen Beach branch of the B41.
B41*	Downtown Brooklyn; Joralemon Street and Court Street at Borough Hall/Court Street ( trains)	↔	Kings Plaza Shopping Center; Avenue U and Flatbush Avenue	Flatbush Avenue	Local	Northern end rerouted.; Bergen Beach branch discontinued (replaced by B40).
B41 Crosstown or B41 SBS	Downtown Brooklyn; Joralemon Street and Court Street at Borough Hall/Court Street ( trains)	↔	Kings Plaza Shopping Center; Avenue U and Flatbush Avenue	Flatbush Avenue	Crosstown/SBS	Northern end rerouted.; Bergen Beach branch discontinued (replaced by B40).
B42*	Canarsie; Shore Parkway (Canarsie Pier Loop)	↔	Canarsie; Rockaway Parkway ( train)	Rockaway Parkway	Local	Only changes to existing route are to stop spacing.
B43*	Prospect Lefferts Gardens; Lincoln Road and Flatbush Avenue at Prospect Park ( trains)	↔	Greenpoint; Box Street and Manhattan Avenue	Kingston and Throop Avenues (northbound)/Albany Avenue and Marcus Garvey Boulevard (southbound); Graham Avenue, Manhattan Avenue	Local	Southbound service rerouted along Albany Avenue and Marcus Garvey Boulevard to serve areas without existing bus service.
B44*	Sheepshead Bay; Knapp Street and Shore Parkway	↔	Williamsburg; Bedford Avenue and Flushing Avenue (last drop-off); Lee Avenue and Flushing Avenue (first pick-up)	Nostrand Avenue; Rogers Avenue (northbound)	Local	Northbound service rerouted along Rogers Avenue to follow existing B44 SBS.; Extended to Williamsburg Bridge Plaza when SBS service isn’t running.
B44 SBS	Sheepshead Bay; Avenue Z and Ocean Parkway	↔	Williamsburg Bridge Plaza; Lane 4	Avenue Z, Nostrand Avenue; Rogers Avenue (northbound)	Crosstown/SBS	Southern end rerouted to provide a transfer to a future wheelchair-accessible subway station.
B45	Downtown Brooklyn; Court Street and Livingston Street	↔	Crown Heights; Fulton Street and Ralph Avenue at Ralph Avenue ( train)	Atlantic Avenue, St. Johns Place	Local	Service rerouted to avoid a narrow segment of St. Johns Place and provide access to the subway.
B46*	Kings Plaza; Avenue U and Flatbush Avenue	↔	Bedford–Stuyvesant; Broadway and Marcus Garvey Boulevard at Flushing Avenue ( trains)	Utica Avenue, Malcolm X Boulevard	Local	Northern end truncated to Flushing Avenue.
B46 SBS	Kings Plaza; Avenue U and Flatbush Avenue	↔	Bedford–Stuyvesant; Malcolm X Boulevard and DeKalb Avenue	Utica Avenue, Malcolm X Boulevard	Crosstown/SBS	Only change is increased frequency during weekday midday.
B47*	Kings Plaza; East 54th Street and Avenue U	↔	Bedford–Stuyvesant; Broadway and Marcus Garvey Boulevard at Flushing Avenue ( trains)	Ralph Avenue, Broadway	Local	Service rerouted in East Flatbush to use Kings Highway and East 98th Street instead of Rockaway Parkway and Clarkson Avenue.
B48	Prospect Lefferts Gardens; Church Avenue and Ocean Avenue at Church Avenue ( trains)	↔	Vinegar Hill; Jay Street and Sands Street at York Street ( trains)	Ocean Avenue; Classon Avenue (northbound)/Franklin Avenue (southbound); Flushing Avenue	Local	Northern end rerouted to serve Brooklyn Navy Yard.; Southern end extended to Church Avenue to provide a transfer to a future wheelchair-accessible subway station.
B49*	Bedford–Stuyvesant; Fulton Street and Bedford Avenue at Franklin Avenue ( trains)	↔	Coney Island; Mermaid Avenue and Stillwell Avenue at Stillwell Avenue ( trains)	Nostrand Avenue (southbound)/New York Avenue (northbound); Ocean Avenue, Avenue Z, Brighton Beach Avenue	Local	Northern section rerouted to Nostrand/New York Avenues.; Southern section rerouted to Coney Island to provide a transfer to a wheelchair-accessible subway station, replace the B68, and avoid sharp turns.
B52*	Downtown Brooklyn; Cadman Plaza West and Tillary Street	↔	Ridgewood Intermodal Terminal at Myrtle–Wyckoff Avenues ( trains)	Gates Avenue	Local	Rerouted in Clinton Hill to remain along Gates Avenue and Fulton Street.
B53*	East New York; Van Sinderen Avenue and Fulton Street at Broadway Junction ( trains)	↔	Sunnyside, Queens; 47th Street and Greenpoint Avenue at 46th Street–Bliss Street ( train)	All trips: Broadway, Sunnyside trips: Kent Avenue/Wythe Avenue, Franklin Street, Greenpoint Avenue	Local	New route replacing northern branch of B24. Sunnyside terminal not served overnights.
B53*	East New York; Van Sinderen Avenue and Fulton Street at Broadway Junction ( trains)	↔	Williamsburg Bridge Plaza	All trips: Broadway, Sunnyside trips: Kent Avenue/Wythe Avenue, Franklin Street, Greenpoint Avenue	Local	New route replacing northern branch of B24. Sunnyside terminal not served overnights.
B54*	Downtown Brooklyn; MetroTech Center at Jay Street–MetroTech ( trains)	↔	Ridgewood Intermodal Terminal at Myrtle–Wyckoff Avenues ( trains)	Myrtle Avenue	Local	Only changes to existing route are to stop spacing.
B55 Crosstown or B55 SBS*	Kensington; McDonald Avenue and Church Avenue at Church Avenue ( trains)	↔	JFK Airport, Queens; Terminal 5 (AirTrain JFK)	Church Avenue, New Lots Avenue, Linden Boulevard, South/North Conduit Avenue	Crosstown/SBS	New route replacing B35 LTD and the JFK Airport branch of the B15.
B57*	Downtown Brooklyn; Livingston Street and Smith Street at Jay Street–MetroTech ( trains)	↔	Jackson Heights, Queens; 83rd Street and 37th Avenue at 82nd Street-Jackson Heights ( train)	Park Avenue, Flushing Avenue, 69th Street, Roosevelt Avenue	Local	Southern end truncated and northern end extended.
B60*	Canarsie; Williams Avenue and Flatlands Avenue	↔	East New York; Broadway and Fulton Street at Broadway Junction ( trains)	Rockaway Avenue	Local	Northern end truncated to Broadway Junction and replaced by B66. Southern end uses Flatlands Avenue in both directions within Canarsie.
B61*	Downtown Brooklyn; Livingston Street and Smith Street at Jay Street–MetroTech ( trains)	↔	Windsor Terrace; 15th Street and Prospect Park West	9th Street, Van Brunt Street, Columbia Street, Atlantic Avenue	Local	Southern end truncated and replaced by B81.
B62*	Downtown Brooklyn; Boerum Place and Livingston Street	↔	Astoria, Queens; 2nd Street and 26th Avenue	Flushing Avenue; Bedford Avenue (northbound)/Driggs Avenue (southbound); Manhattan Avenue, Jackson Avenue, 21st Street, 27th Avenue	Local	Service extended to Astoria to provide local service for the Q69 bus.; Rerouted through Brooklyn Navy Yard to replace the B67 bus.; Operates through Vinegar Hill when B27 is not running.
B63*	Fort Hamilton; Shore Road and 4th Avenue	↔	Brooklyn Bridge Park; Pier 6	5th Avenue, Atlantic Avenue	Local	Only changes to existing route are to stop spacing.
B64	Sunset Park; 2nd Avenue and 55th Street	↔	Coney Island; Mermaid Avenue and Stillwell Avenue at Stillwell Avenue ( trains)	Bay Ridge Avenue, 13th Avenue, Bath Avenue, Cropsey Avenue	Local	Northern end extended to serve Sunset Park.; Southern end rerouted to replace the B82, which is being shortened.
B65	Downtown Brooklyn; Fulton Street and Smith Street at Jay Street–MetroTech ( trains)	↔	Crown Heights; Ralph Avenue and St. Marks Avenue	Atlantic Avenue; Dean Street (eastbound)/Bergen Street (westbound)	Local	Western end rerouted to avoid narrow streets and sharp turns.; Eastern end truncated to St. Marks Avenue.
B66*	East New York; Broadway and Fulton Street at Broadway Junction ( trains)	↔	Williamsburg Bridge Plaza; Lane 2	Cooper Street, Wilson Avenue; Meserole Avenue and South 4th Street (northbound)/South 5th Street and Montrose Avenue (southbound)	Local	New route replacing northern end of B60.
B67	Kensington; Cortelyou Road and McDonald Avenue	↔	Vinegar Hill; Jay Street and Sands Street at York Street ( trains)	McDonald Avenue, 7th Avenue, Flatbush Avenue, Jay Street	Local	Northern end truncated and replaced by B62.
B68	Park Slope; Bartel Pritchard Square at 15th Street–Prospect Park ( trains)	↔	Manhattan Beach; Mackenzie Street and Oriental Boulevard at Kingsborough Community College	Prospect Park Southwest, Coney Island Avenue, Brighton Beach Avenue	Local	Southern end rerouted to replace the B49.
B69	Windsor Terrace; 19th Street and Prospect Park West	↔	Greenpoint; Meeker Avenue and Gardner Avenue	7th Avenue, Vanderbilt Avenue, Lorimer Street, Nassau Avenue	Local	Northern end extended to replace the B48.; Southern end truncated.
B70	Sunset Park; 3rd Avenue and 30th Street	↔	V.A. Medical Center	39th Street, 8th Avenue, 7th Avenue	Local	Northern end extended to serve Industry City.
B74	Coney Island; Stillwell Avenue and Mermaid Bus Loop at Stillwell Avenue ( trains)	↻	Sea Gate; West 37th Street and Neptune Avenue	Mermaid Avenue	Local	Clockwise loop in Sea Gate.; Only changes to existing route are to stop spacing.
B76	Canarsie; Seaview Avenue and East 80th Street	↔	East New York; Van Sinderen Avenue and Fulton Street at Broadway Junction ( trains)	East 80th Street, Avenue L, Rockaway Parkway, Rockaway Avenue	Local	New route replacing the B17 branch to East 80th Street and supplementing the B42 and B60.; Operates weekday peak hours only.
B81	Red Hook; Pioneer Street and Conover Street	↔	Flatbush; Flatbush Avenue and Nostrand Avenue at Flatbush Avenue ( trains)	Lorraine Street, 9th Street, Prospect Park West, McDonald Avenue, Cortelyou Road, Flatbush Avenue	Local	New route replacing the northern portion of the B103, supplementing the B61 and B67, and providing a direct connection from Red Hook to central Brooklyn.
B82*	Spring Creek; Pennsylvania Avenue and Seaview Avenue at Starrett City	↔	Bath Beach; Crospey Avenue and Bay 38th Street	Flatlands Avenue, Kings Highway, Bay Parkway	Local	Service rerouted in Flatlands to follow B82 SBS.; Southern end truncated.
B82 SBS	Spring Creek; Pennsylvania Avenue and Seaview Avenue at Starrett City	↔	Bath Beach; Crospey Avenue and Bay 38th Street	Flatlands Avenue, Kings Highway, Bay Parkway	Crosstown/SBS	Only changes to existing route are to stop spacing and frequencies.
B83*	Gateway Center Mall	↔	East New York; Van Sinderen Avenue and Fulton Street at Broadway Junction ( trains)	Pennsylvania Avenue	Local	Service rerouted to stay on Pennsylvania Avenue instead of shifting to Van Siclen Avenue.; Overnights, Gateway Center-bound trips terminate at Starrett City.
B100	Midwood; East 16th Street and Quentin Road at Kings Highway ( trains)	↔	Mill Basin; National Drive and Mill Avenue (last drop-off); 56th Drive and Strickland Avenue (first pick-up)	Avenue R, Fillmore Avenue, East 66th Street	Local	Service rerouted to use Avenue R instead of Quentin Road.
B103	East New York; Livonia Avenue and Warwick Street at New Lots Avenue ( train)	↔	Flatbush; Flatbush Avenue and Nostrand Avenue at Flatbush Avenue ( trains)	East 105th Street, Avenue M, East 80th Street, Avenue H	Limited	Alternating trips to Downtown Brooklyn discontinued, with all trips terminating at Flatbush Avenue.; Eastern end extended to New Lots Avenue to provide a transfer to a future wheelchair-accessible subway station.

== Former and never-operated routes ==
Note that the "B" prefix was not used for on-bus signage until the mid-1970s. On December 11, 1988, some of the Brooklyn "B" routes running primarily in Queens (the B53, B55, B56, B58, and B59 routes) were redesignated as "Q" routes.

Route	Terminals		Major streets	History
B3K	Marine Park; Gerritsen Avenue and Avenue U	Midwood; Quentin Road and East 16th Street	East 16th Street and Avenue U	Subway shuttle during reconstruction of Avenue U and Neck Road stations from 2008 to 2010. Operated during PM rush hours from December 2008 to January 2010 when the southbound platforms were closed, and during AM rush hours from January to October 2010 when the northbound platforms were closed.
B5	Bensonhurst; Cropsey Avenue and Canal Avenue	Flatlands; Ryder Street and Kings Highway	Kings Highway, Bay Parkway, Cropsey Avenue	Merged with B50 into B82 on September 10, 1995 due to budget crisis.
B10	Bedford-Stuyvesant; Broadway and Marcus Garvey Boulevard	City Line; Linden Boulevard and Eldert Lane	Marcus Garvey Boulevard (ex-Sumner Avenue), Lewis Avenue, New Lots Avenue	Route still exists today; extended to JFK Airport in 1993.; Route was renumbered to B15 to avoid confusion with the Q10.
B15	Downtown Brooklyn; Hanson Place and Flatbush Avenue	Chinatown, Manhattan; Baxter Street and Canal Street	Flatbush Avenue, Manhattan Bridge	Began on November 13, 1929 by Brooklyn-Manhattan Transit Corporation.; Discontinued between 1969 and 1977, became an extension of the B63, later the B51, and then it was discontinued on June 27, 2010.
B18	Williamsburg; Graham Avenue and Metropolitan Avenue	Cypress Hills; Jamaica Avenue and Crescent Street	Metropolitan Avenue, Morgan Avenue, Wyckoff Avenue, Cypress Avenue	Began on November 30, 1931 by Brooklyn-Manhattan Transit.; Extended from Ridgewood to Cypress Hills on September 1, 1947.; Merged into an extended B13 on September 8, 2002 west of Myrtle Avenue (east of it was discontinued).
B19 (first use)	Ridgewood, Queens; Forest Avenue and 67th Avenue	Cypress Hills; Jamaica Avenue and Crescent Street	Fresh Pond Road, Cypress Hills Street	Became northern part of the B13 on May 1, 1938.
B19 (second use)	Downtown Brooklyn; Hanson Place and Flatbush Avenue	Fort Greene; Grand Avenue and Flushing Avenue	Carlton Avenue, Adelphi Street	Discontinued in 1988.
B21	Manhattan Beach; Mackenzie Street and Oriental Boulevard	Sheepshead Bay; Knapp Street and Voorhies Avenue	Oriental Boulevard, Brighton Beach Avenue, Ocean Parkway, Avenue Z, Emmons Avenue	Replaced in 1978 with parts of the B1, B4, and B36.
B22	East New York; Broadway and Lafayette Street	Jamaica, Queens; 89th Avenue and Parsons Boulevard	Broadway, Atlantic Avenue	Route still exists. Relabeled and renumbered to Q24 on December 11, 1988.
B23	Borough Park; New Utrecht Avenue and 62nd Street	Flatbush; Flatbush Avenue and Cortelyou Road	16th Avenue, Cortelyou Road	16th Avenue Line streetcar until January 26, 1930 and Cortelyou Road Line streetcar until July 23, 1930.; Streetcar known as "Avenue C Line"; Discontinued on June 27, 2010 due to a budget crisis.
B27	East New York; Alabama Avenue and Fulton Street	City Line; Elderts Lane and Fulton Street	Fulton Street	Started on March 12, 1950, and ended February 1, 1955. Route started some time after the Fulton Street streetcar was abandoned.
B27X	See X27 for details.			Brooklyn-Manhattan express bus route.
B28			Columbia Street	Discontinued March 4, 1944.
B28X	See X28 for details.			Brooklyn-Manhattan express bus route.
B29 (first use)	Greenpoint; West Street and Greenpoint Avenue	Williamsburg; Broadway and Kent Street	Metropolitan Avenue, Kingsland Avenue, Meeker Avenue	Southern part of the current B24.
B29X	See X29 for details.			Brooklyn-Manhattan express bus route.
B30	Greenpoint; Kingsland Avenue and Meeker Avenue	Woodside, Queens; 47th Street and Greenpoint Avenue	Humboldt Street, Kingsland Avenue, Greenpoint Avenue, Review Avenue, 48th Street	Created prior from portions of B29 that were not merged into the B24.; Discontinued on September 10, 1995 due to a budget crisis.
B33	Red Hook; Ferry Place and Hamilton Avenue	Prospect Lefferts Gardens; Flatbush Avenue and Ocean Avenue	Hamilton Avenue, Prospect Avenue, Parkside Avenue, Ocean Avenue	Discontinued in 1993.
B34	Bay Ridge; Shore Road and Bay Ridge Avenue	Bath Beach; Harway Avenue and 25th Avenue	Bay Ridge Avenue, 13th Avenue, 86th Street	Replaced by an extension of the B1 in 1978. Currently part of B1 and B64 routes.
B36S	Sea Gate; Surf Avenue	shuttle loop	West 37th Street, Poplar Avenue and Surf Avenue in the private community of Sea Gate, which was not open to the general public.	Renumbered from B73 by 1969.; Sea Gate shuttle; 1.4 miles (2.3 km)-long; Weekday service operated from 6 a.m. to 8 p.m., with a frequency of 12 to 15 minutes, and weekend service operated from 10 a.m. to 8 p.m.. on a 12-minute headway; This route was discontinued in 1988 due to low ridership. The route only averaged two passengers per trip. Its discontinuation affected 118 weekday passengers and 69 weekend daily passengers. A public hearing was held on October 17, 1988 so that the local community could respond to the route's proposed discontinuation.
B38 (first use)			New Utrecht Avenue	Discontinued on June 28, 1947; redundant with the BMT West End Line.
B40	Williamsburg; Williamsburg Bridge Plaza	East New York; Liberty Avenue and Pennsylvania Avenue	Broadway, Ralph Avenue, Liberty Avenue	This route was discontinued on September 8, 2002, and the Ralph Avenue portion merged with the B78 to form the current B47.
B47 (first use)	Williamsburg; Williamsburg Bridge Plaza	Prospect Lefferts Gardens; Flatbush Avenue and Empire Boulevard	Empire Boulevard, Kingston Avenue, Brooklyn Avenue, Throop Avenue, Tompkins Avenue, Division Avenue	Merged on September 10, 1995 with B62 to form the B43 route due to a budget crisis.
B50	Spring Creek; Seaview Avenue and Pennsylvania Avenue	Midwood; Coney Island Avenue and Kings Highway	Kings Highway, Flatlands Avenue, Seaview Avenue	Created in 1978.; Merged with the B5 on September 10, 1995 to form the B82 due to a budget crisis.
B51	City Hall, Manhattan; Beekman Street and Park Row	Downtown Brooklyn; Fulton Street and Smith Street	Flatbush Avenue, Manhattan Bridge, Lafayette Street, St. James Place	Began on September 9, 1985, replacing part of the B63.; Replaced the Manhattan Bridge Three Cent Line streetcar.; On November 14, 2005, bus service was restored on Park Row between Chatham Square and City Hall. Buses had been running on Frankfort St and St. James Place.; Discontinued on June 27, 2010 due to a budget crisis.
B53	Williamsburg; Williamsburg Bridge Plaza	Jamaica, Queens; 171st Street and Jamaica Avenue	Grand Street, Metropolitan Avenue	Route still exists. Relabeled and renumbered to Q54 on December 11, 1988.
B55	Ridgewood, Queens; Wyckoff Avenue and Palmetto Street	Richmond Hill, Queens; Jamaica Avenue and Myrtle Avenue	Myrtle Avenue	Route still exists. Relabeled to Q55 on December 11, 1988.
B56	East New York; Broadway and Fulton Street	Jamaica, Queens; 171st Street and Jamaica Avenue	Jamaica Avenue	Route still exists. Relabeled to Q56 on December 11, 1988.
B58	Ridgewood, Queens; Wyckoff Avenue and Palmetto Street	Flushing, Queens; Main Street and 41st Road	Fresh Pond Road, Grand Avenue, Corona Avenue	Route still exists. Relabeled to Q58 on December 11, 1988.
B59	Rego Park, Queens; 63rd Drive and Queens Blvd	Williamsburg; Williamsburg Bridge Plaza	Grand Avenue, Grand Street	Original Queens terminus was 72nd Street and Grand Avenue.; Route still exists. Relabeled to Q59 on December 11, 1988.
B62 (first use)	Greenpoint; Box Street and Manhattan Avenue	Downtown Brooklyn; Pearl Street and High Street	Flushing Avenue, Graham Avenue	The Graham Avenue portion of the route merged with the former B47 to form B43 on September 10, 1995 due to a budget crisis.; The Flushing Avenue portion was discontinued due to a budget crisis.
B66	Downtown Brooklyn; Cadman Plaza and Tillary Street	Red Hook, Brooklyn; Columbia Street and Halleck Street	Court Street	Now part of the B57, formerly part of the B75.; On March 8, 1954, a public hearing on the route's proposed discontinuation was held. The route was discontinued on May 1, 1954.
B71	Cobble Hill; Van Brunt Street and Sackett Street	Crown Heights; Sterling Place and Rogers Avenue	Union Street, Eastern Parkway	Union Street Line streetcar until December 1, 1945.; Discontinued on June 27, 2010 due to a budget crisis.
B72	East Elmhurst, Queens; 23rd Avenue and Junction Boulevard	Rego Park, Queens; Queens Boulevard and Junction Boulevard	Junction Boulevard	Transferred to Triboro Coach Corporation in 1961, relabeled to Q72.; Route still exists
B73	Sea Gate; Atlantic Avenue and Surf Avenue	shuttle loop		Renumbered B36S by 1969.
B74SS	Sea Gate; West 37th Street and Mermaid Avenue	Brighton Beach; Corbin Place and Oriental Boulevard	Mermaid Avenue, Neptune Avenue, Brighton Beach Avenue	SS stands for "Shoppers Special", started in the early 1980s and discontinued afterwards.
B75	Downtown Brooklyn; Sands Street and Jay Street	Park Slope; 20th Street and Prospect Park West	Court Street, Smith Street, 9th Street	Court Street Line streetcar until July 17, 1949 and Smith Street Line streetcar until February 11, 1951.; Replaced on June 27, 2010 with B57 and B61 due to a budget crisis.
B76				Discontinued by 1969.
B77	Red Hook; Beard Street and Van Brunt Street	Park Slope; 5th Avenue and 10th Street	Lorraine Street, 9th Street	Began on August 27, 1936 by Brooklyn-Manhattan Transit.; In April 2002, plans were announced to modify the eastbound route of the B77 to eliminate delays along Bush Street after the opening and expansion of an entrance to a waste transfer station. Instead of running via Lorraine Street, Court Street, Bush Street, and Smith Street, buses would run via Lorraine Street, Court Street, Hamilton Avenue, Bush Street, and Smith Street. This change was implemented on a temporary basis in 2001.; On June 15, 2008, service was extended to Beard Street and Van Brunt Street to serve the newly opened IKEA in Red Hook. Service along Coffey Street was discontinued.; Merged with B61 on June 27, 2010 due to a budget crisis.
B77S	Red Hook; Smith Street and 9th Street	Red Hook; Halleck Street and Columbia Street	West 9th Street, Columbia Street; (Erie Basin/Red Hook pier Shuttle)	Discontinued in the late 1980s due to low ridership.; Now part of the B61 and formerly part of the B77.
B78	Brownsville; Rutland Road and East 98th Street	Kings Plaza Shopping Center; East 54th Street and Avenue U	Ralph Avenue	Merged with the B40 on September 8, 2002 to form the B47.
B79				Discontinued by 1969.
B80	Flatbush Avenue and Nostrand Avenue	World's Fair		Only operated during the 1964 World's Fair.
B81	Eastern Parkway and Utica Avenue	World's Fair		Only operated during the 1964 World's Fair.
B82 (first use)	Kings Plaza Shopping Center; Flatbush Avenue and Avenue U	Bergen Beach; East 74th Street and Avenue U	Avenue U	Now part of the B3.
B84 (first use)	East New York	Canarsie; Rockaway Parkway and Glenwood Road	Flatlands Avenue, Cozine Avenue	New route started on July 1, 1968.; Now part of the B6.
B85	Army Base			Army Base Shuttle; only ran for a few months in 1969.
B86	Bay Ridge; 4th Avenue and 86th Street	Manhattan Beach; Mackenzie Street and Oriental Boulevard	86th Street, Brighton Beach Avenue	Proposed in the late 1970s. Implemented in 2010 as a rerouted B1.
B87				
B88	Downtown Brooklyn; Court Street and Remsen Street	shuttle loop		Nicknamed "Culture Bus Loop II".; 29 stops along the route between Brooklyn and Manhattan.; Began operating on May 26, 1973 (Memorial Day weekend); weekends and holidays only.; Discontinued after Labor Day on September 3, 1984.
B91	Williamsburg; Williamsburg Bridge Plaza	shuttle loop		Special Williamsburg Link bus service for the L train shutdown.; Began on April 26, 2019 as B91 and B92, operating on weekends to provide alternate service during weekend work on the Canarsie Tunnels.; B91 and B92 discontinued on June 8, 2019 due to low ridership; replaced by B91A.; B91A discontinued on September 1, 2019, ending all Williamsburg Link service.
B91A	Williamsburg; Williamsburg Bridge Plaza	shuttle loop		Special Williamsburg Link bus service for the L train shutdown.; Began on April 26, 2019 as B91 and B92, operating on weekends to provide alternate service during weekend work on the Canarsie Tunnels.; B91 and B92 discontinued on June 8, 2019 due to low ridership; replaced by B91A.; B91A discontinued on September 1, 2019, ending all Williamsburg Link service.
B92	Williamsburg; Williamsburg Bridge Plaza	shuttle loop		Special Williamsburg Link bus service for the L train shutdown.; Began on April 26, 2019 as B91 and B92, operating on weekends to provide alternate service during weekend work on the Canarsie Tunnels.; B91 and B92 discontinued on June 8, 2019 due to low ridership; replaced by B91A.; B91A discontinued on September 1, 2019, ending all Williamsburg Link service.
B98V	East New York; Stanley Avenue and Sheridan Avenue	Crown Heights; Nostrand Avenue and Carroll Street	Flatlands Avenue, Linden Boulevard, Rockaway Avenue, Eastern Parkway/Empire Boulevard and East New York Avenue	Began service on March 1, 2021, to bring people from Brownsville, Canarsie, and East New York to the COVID-19 vaccination center at Medgar Evers College.; Operated only from 6:30 AM to 9 PM, every 30 minutes.; Discontinued on April 25, 2021 due to low ridership.
B99 (first use)	Columbus Circle, Manhattan	Midwood; Nostrand Avenue and Flatbush Avenue at Flatbush Avenue–Brooklyn College station ( trains)	9 Avenue (southbound) 8 Avenue (northbound); Manhattan Bridge, Flatbush Avenue, Eastern Parkway; Nostrand Avenue (southbound) New York Avenue (northbound)	Began June 28, 2020, due to the overnight subway shutdown onset by the COVID-19 pandemic.; Operated between 1 AM and 6 AM, every 20 minutes.; Discontinued on June 10, 2021 due to overnight subway service being restored.
B101	Midwood; East 16th Street and Kings Highway	Bergen Beach; East 74th Street and Avenue L	Avenue L, Kings Highway	Never implemented, proposed by Pioneer Bus in the 1970s.
B201	Columbus Circle, Manhattan	Canarsie East 98th Street and Glenwood Road at Canarsie-Rockaway Parkway station ( train)	9th Avenue (southbound), 8th Avenue (northbound); Nostrand Avenue (southbound), New York Avenue (northbound)	Never implemented, proposed as alternatives to the overnight B99 and M99 bus routes.; Routes would have been operated out of MTA Bus Company instead of NYCT Bus.; Full route pattern unknown, as the only known information on the two routes has been found in bus route sign code listings.
B202	East Midtown, Manhattan East 57th Street and 2nd Avenue	Canarsie East 98th Street and Glenwood Road at Canarsie-Rockaway Parkway station ( train)	57th Street; 11th Avenue (southbound), 10th Avenue (northbound); Fulton Street, Rockaway Avenue	Never implemented, proposed as alternatives to the overnight B99 and M99 bus routes.; Routes would have been operated out of MTA Bus Company instead of NYCT Bus.; Full route pattern unknown, as the only known information on the two routes has been found in bus route sign code listings.
DeKalb Avenue shuttle	Chinatown, Manhattan; Grand Street and Chrystie Street	Downtown Brooklyn; Dekalb Avenue and Flatbush Avenue		Service between Grand Street station in Manhattan and DeKalb Avenue station in Brooklyn.; Established when the north side of the Manhattan Bridge closed for construction on July 22, 2001.; Suspended after September 11th attacks due to street closures; not resumed due to low ridership.
Holy Cross Shuttle	Flatbush; Brooklyn Avenue and Beverly Road	Flatbush; Nostrand Avenue and Beverly Road	Beverly Road	Operated from April 1, 1951 to September 30, 1959.; Served by northbound B44 buses, only toward Nostrand Avenue.
