= Williamsburg Bridge Plaza Bus Terminal =

Bus terminal in Brooklyn, New York

Williamsburg Bridge Plaza
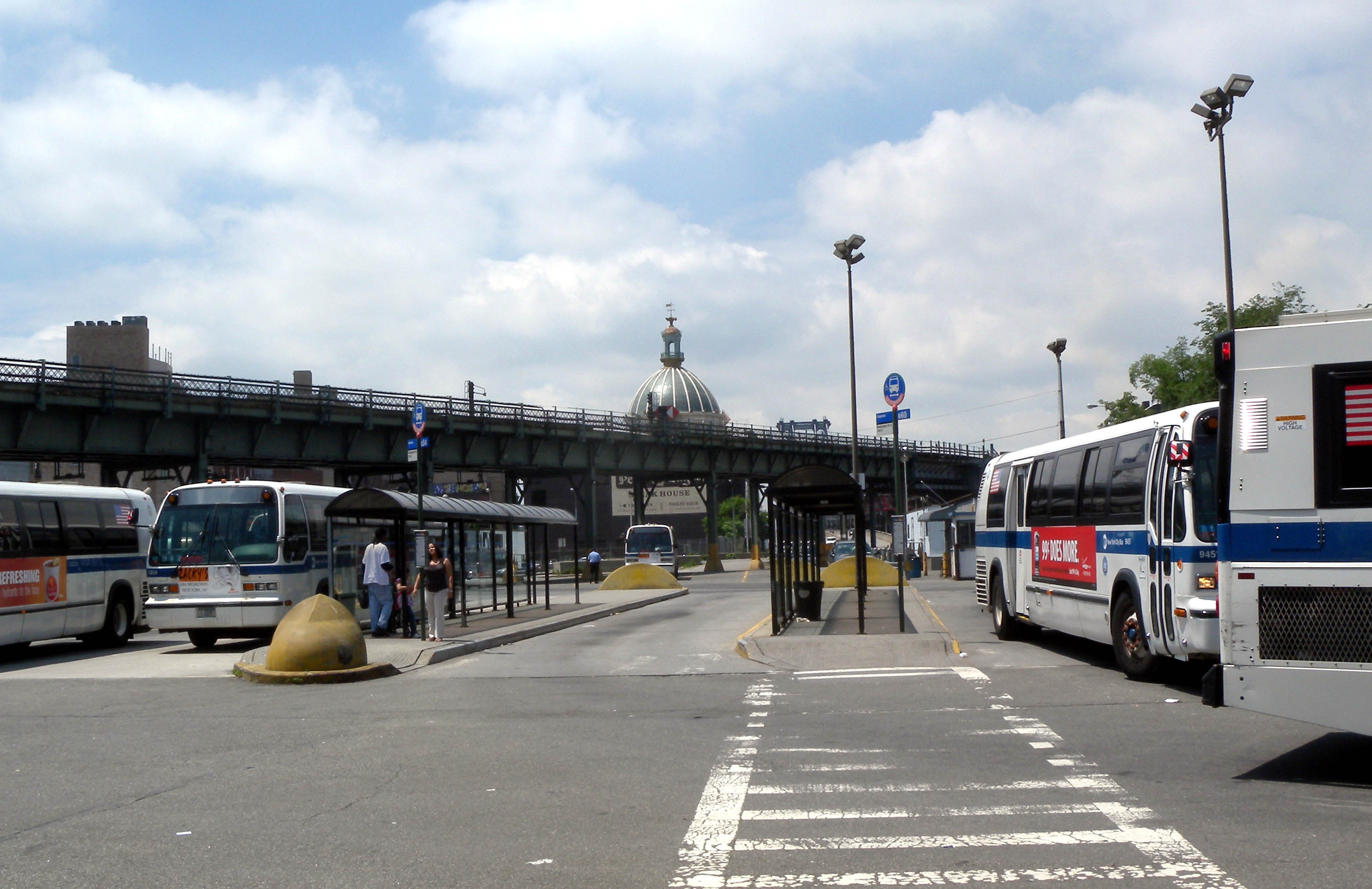

General information
- Location: Broadway & Havemeyer Street; Williamsburg, Brooklyn, New York
- Coordinates: 40°42′36″N 73°57′38″W
- System: New York City bus station
- Owner: Metropolitan Transportation Authority
- Operator: New York City Transit Authority
- Bus routes: 7 Brooklyn routes, 2 Queens routes
- Bus stands: 5
- Connections: New York City Subway: at Marcy Avenue; Williamsburg Bridge

Passengers
- Daily: 150,000
Location

The Williamsburg Bridge Plaza, sometimes called Washington Plaza or the Williamsburg Bridge Transit Center, is a major bus terminal and former trolley terminal located at the foot of the Williamsburg Bridge in the New York City borough of Brooklyn, one block west of the Brooklyn-Queens Expressway (I-278). It is situated by the boundaries of Broadway, Havemeyer Street, Roebling Street, and South 5th Street, south of the LaGuardia Playground. It contains five bus lanes, and serves as a terminal for numerous MTA New York City Transit Authority bus routes of Brooklyn and Queens that start and end their runs there.

This bus terminal is near the Marcy Avenue subway station on the BMT Jamaica Line of the New York City Subway, located at the intersection of Marcy Avenue and Broadway, which is served by the J, M, and Z trains.

The bus terminal is one of three plazas at the foot of the bridge that constitute Washington Plaza, along with Continental Army Plaza and LaGuardia Playground across South 5th Street, which are run by the Parks Department.

== Layout ==
=== As a streetcar terminal ===
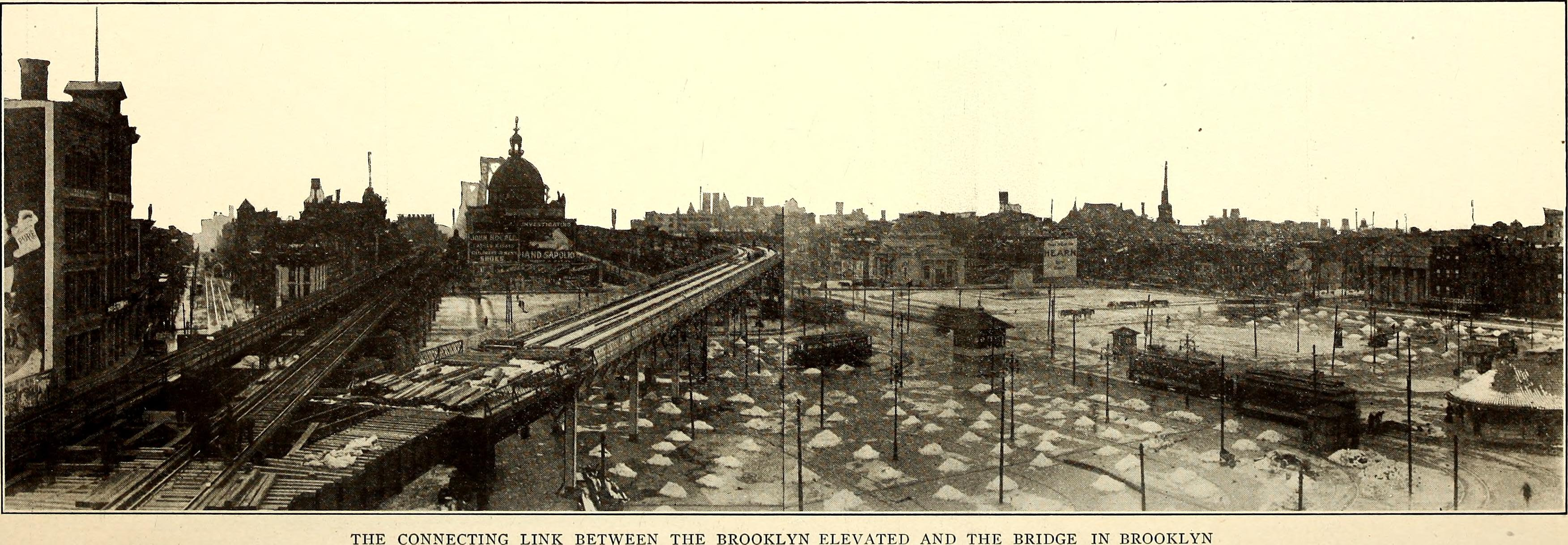
The terminal circa 1908, when it served streetcars.

The original Washington Plaza trolley terminal occupied both blocks between Broadway to the south and South Fourth Street to the north. The right-of-way of South 5th Street ran through the center of the plaza, occupied entirely by a pair of trolley tracks which fed into the Williamsburg Bridge. These tracks were used by the lines of the New York Railways Company and Third Avenue Railway from Manhattan. Both blocks were occupied by numerous balloon loops, which streetcars used to reverse direction. The plaza was originally open-aired. At some point afterwards, shelters were added for loading and unloading passengers.

The plaza served as a hub for Brooklyn surface trolleys, particularly those of the Brooklyn Rapid Transit Company (BRT). This included those from Nostrand Avenue surface line and Reid Avenue Line, among several that went over the bridge to Manhattan.

The northern half of the terminal has since been replaced by LaGuardia Playground, named after former New York City mayor Fiorello H. La Guardia.

=== As a bus terminal ===
The current bus terminal lies on the southern block of the former trolley terminal, with Broadway to the south and South 5th Street to the north. The terminal consists of five lanes or bays, numbered 1 to 5 from north to south. Lane 6 was rebuilt as a station house with MetroCard Vending Machines, and as of 2015, is out of service. Each bay contains a low-level sidewalk platform with several shelters. Buses enter the terminal from the west, where there is a layover area. Buses can exit the terminal to either Broadway or South 5th Street at the east end of the block.

Current bus routes include:

Lane	Route	Destination
1	B39	Lower East Side, Manhattan; Delancey Street and Allen Street
1	B60	Canarsie; Williams Avenue and Flatlands Avenue
2	B24	Greenpoint; Greenpoint Avenue and Manhattan Avenue
2	Q54	Jamaica, Queens; 170th Street and Jamaica Avenue
3	B46	Kings Plaza Shopping Center; Avenue U and Flatbush Avenue
4	B44 Local (Late nights only)	Sheepshead Bay; Nostrand Avenue and Emmons Avenue
4	B44 SBS Select Bus Service	Sheepshead Bay; Knapp Street and Emmons Avenue (full route) or Avenue U and Nostrand Avenue
5	N/A	N/A
Broadway and Roebling Street	Q59	Rego Park, Queens; 62nd Drive and Queens Boulevard at 63rd Drive ( trains)
Broadway and Roebling Street	B32	Long Island City, Queens; 44th Drive and 21st Street at Court Square ( trains)
Broadway and Roebling Street	B62	Long Island City, Queens Jackson Avenue and Queens Plaza South at Queensboro Plaza ( trains) and Queens Plaza ( trains)
Roebling and South 8th Streets	B62	Downtown Brooklyn; Boerum Place and Livingston Street

== History ==
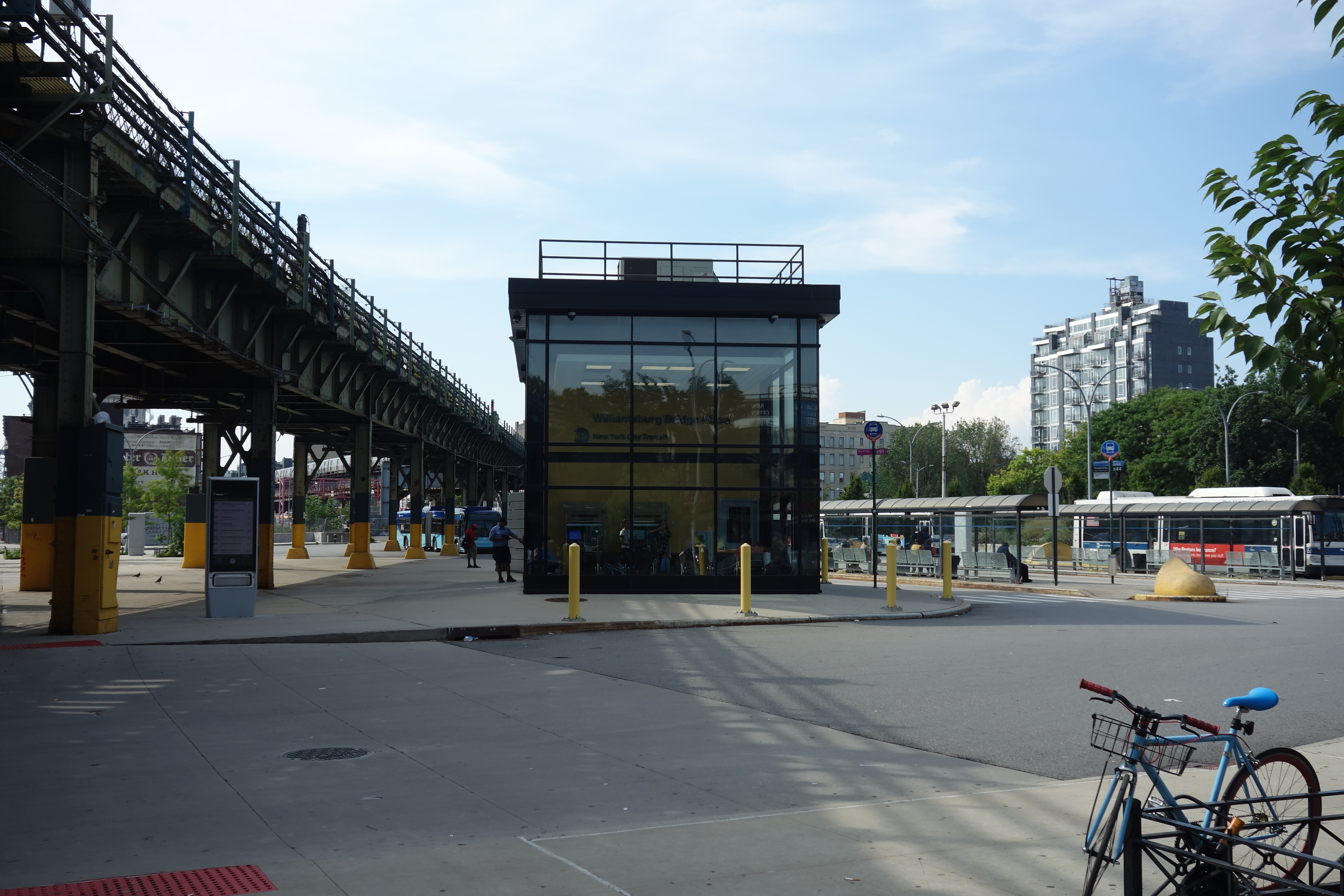
The waiting room at the entrance to the terminal, completed in 2017.

The bridge plaza terminal has existed at least since the opening of the Williamsburg Bridge in December 1903, and possibly earlier. On November 6, 1904, BRT streetcars began crossing the bridge to Lower Manhattan. At this time, many streetcar routes that terminated at Broadway Ferry were re-routed to terminate at Washington Plaza, or to go over the bridge to the Delancey Street terminal in Manhattan. Meanwhile, four Manhattan trolley routes from the New York Railways Company were extended across the bridge to Washington Plaza. The Third Avenue Railway also operated streetcars from Manhattan to Washington Plaza. In 1919, the plaza was renamed "Washington Plaza". That year, New York Railway cars ceased operating to the plaza from Manhattan, while Third Avenue service continued to operate.

On December 1, 1923, service on the now-Brooklyn–Manhattan Transit Corporation (BMT) lines over the Williamsburg Bridge ended, due to decreasing profits and a dispute with the city over tolls. BMT service was truncated to Washington Plaza, and bridge service was replaced with municipal shuttle service. To promote the new service, the city constructed a shed on the south side of the plaza. On February 15, 1931, BMT streetcars once again began running to Manhattan, after municipal shuttle service ended. Only the Nostrand, Ralph, Reid, and Tompkins lines resumed traveling over the bridge, while the remaining lines continued to terminate at Washington Plaza. On January 20, 1932, bridge service from Third Avenue's Grand Street and Post Office Lines was discontinued, due to the northern bridge tracks being deemed unsafe. In Spring 1935, the northern portion of the trolley terminal was converted into LaGuardia Playground. Construction began on April 1, and the playground opened on July 2.

On December 6, 1948, the last of the streetcar lines to run over the bridge, the "Williamsburg Bridge Local" shuttle between the Manhattan and Brooklyn trolley terminals, was converted into the B39 bus route, which ran between the plaza and Lower Manhattan. By 1951, the New York City Board of Transportation (later succeeded by the New York City Transit Authority) motorized all the trolley routes into bus routes, and established the current bus terminal. The new lines included the B44 route, which replaced the Nostrand Avenue line in 1951.

The New York City Department of Transportation (NYCDOT) is planning to renovate this terminal. The project will bring new benches, a sleek, glass-paneled indoor waiting room, public restrooms, and widened sidewalks to the eight bus lines serving in the terminal. The project was unveiled in October 2013, with NYCDOT officials planning to begin construction in spring 2014 and complete the project in summer 2015.
