= B47 (New York City bus) =

Bus route in Brooklyn, New York

b47
- Ralph Avenue Line
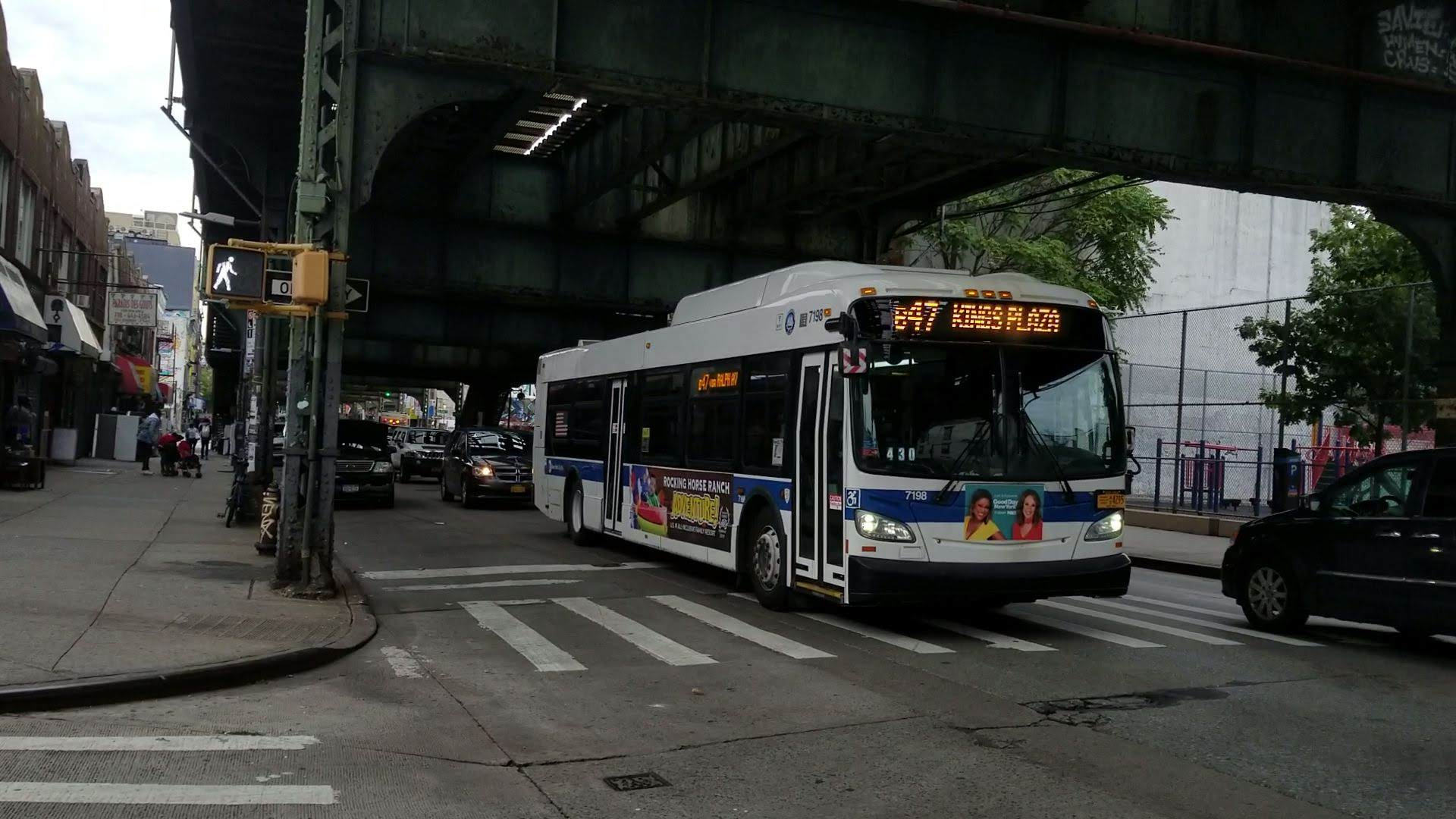
- A 2015 XD40 (7198) on the B47 heading to Kings Plaza.

Overview
- System: MTA Regional Bus Operations
- Operator: New York City Transit Authority
- Garage: Fresh Pond Depot
- Vehicle: New Flyer Xcelsior XD40
- Began service: 1943 (streetcar line); 1951 (bus)

Route
- Locale: Brooklyn, New York, U.S.
- Communities served: Bedford–Stuyvesant, Crown Heights, Brownsville, Remsen Village, East Flatbush, Flatlands, Mill Basin, Marine Park
- Start: Bedford–Stuyvesant – Woodhull Medical Center
- Via: Ralph Avenue
- End: Mill Basin / Marine Park – Kings Plaza
- Length: 6.2 miles (10.0 km) (entire route)

Service
- Operates: All times
- Annual patronage: 1,539,884 (2025)
- Timetable: B47

The B47 is a surface transit line on Ralph Avenue in Brooklyn, New York City. Once a streetcar line, it is now part of the B47 bus route, operated by the New York City Transit Authority, Prior to 1995, it was the B78 route; the northern part of the route from St. Johns Place to Woodhull Hospital was part of the B40 line. The B47 was created as a result of a merger of the B40 and B78 on September 8, 2002.

== Route description ==
The southbound B47 begins at the Woodhull Medical Center in Bedford–Stuyvesant, near the intersection of Marcus Garvey Boulevard and Ellery Street. It travels southeast along Broadway, then turns right on Ralph Avenue, heading south on Ralph Avenue. Since Ralph Avenue is split into two sections in Brownsville, the B47 makes a series of zigzag turns in the neighborhood, first turning right at East New York Avenue, then left at East 98th Street, right at Rutland Road, left at Rockaway Parkway, right at Clarkson Avenue, and left at Remsen Avenue. The B47 bears to the right where Ralph Avenue resumes. The bus then continues south along Ralph Avenue before bearing left at Mill Avenue. It next turns right at Avenue U where it continues until its terminus at East 54th Street, in front of the Kings Plaza Shopping Center in Mill Basin.

The northbound B47 begins at East 54th Street, then continues northeast on Avenue U, turns left onto Mill Avenue, and bears right on Ralph Avenue. The B47 bears left at Remsen Avenue when the southern section of Ralph Avenue ends. The B47 turns right onto Clarkson Avenue, left onto East 98th Street, and right on East New York Avenue. The bus turns left at Ralph Avenue, where it continues until reaching the northern end of Ralph Avenue at Broadway. The B47 turns left then continues northwest along Broadway until reaching Woodhull Hospital, where it terminates.

=== School trippers ===
When school is in session, one bus departs J.H.S. 078 Roy H. Mann at 2:25pm and heads to Ralph Avenue via Avenue N. This trip goes north and runs the full route to Woodhull Hospital. An extra bus leaves Kings Plaza at 3:20pm but terminates at the Sutter Avenue-Rutland Road station. In addition, one bus that goes south to Kings Plaza originates at Beverly Road, outside I.S. 285 Meyer Levin at 2:55pm.

== History ==
The Ralph Avenue Line was one of a number of branch lines of the Brooklyn, Queens County and Suburban Railroad's Broadway Line.

Service on the line used to originate at the Williamsburg Bridge Trolley Terminal on the Lower East Side of Manhattan, but was cut back to Washington Plaza in Brooklyn in 1949.

The Ralph Avenue corridor featured two streetcars, the Ralph Avenue Line and the Ralph and Rockaway Avenues Line, both of which originated at the Williamsburg Bridge Trolley Terminal. The former ran via 98th Street, Ralph Avenue, and Broadway, while the latter ran via Rockaway Avenue, Ralph Avenue, and Broadway. Ralph Avenue service was discontinued on November 1, 1943. Ralph and Rockaway Avenues Line service was replaced by B40 bus service on May 27, 1951.

The B40 bus replaced the northern portion of the Ralph Avenue Line, and it traveled on Broadway, Ralph Avenue, and Liberty Avenue between the Williamsburg Bridge Plaza Bus Terminal in Williamsburg and the Liberty Avenue subway station in East New York. The B78 replaced the southern portion of the Ralph Avenue Line, and traveled from the Sutter Avenue–Rutland Road subway station in Brownsville to the Kings Plaza Shopping Center. The two routes did not intersect. The B40 and B78 routes were discontinued September 8, 2002, and the Ralph Avenue portion of the B40 merged with the B78 at that time to form the current B47.

On December 1, 2022, the MTA released a draft redesign of the Brooklyn bus network. As part of the redesign, B47 service would be rerouted in East Flatbush to use Kings Highway and East 98th Street instead of Rockaway Parkway and Clarkson Avenue. Closely spaced stops would also be eliminated.

Until 2024, the school trippers running from Roy H. Mann Intermediate School to the Sutter Avenue-Rutland Road station were based out of the Flatbush Depot.

== See also ==
=== Connecting bus routes ===
- B15 (at Marcus Garvey Boulevard)
- B54 (at Myrtle Avenue)
- B46 (at Malcolm X Boulevard)
- B38, B46 SBS (at DeKalb Avenue)
- B38, Q24 (at Lafayette Avenue)
- B52 (at Gates Avenue)
- B26 (at Halsey Street)
- B25 (at Fulton Street)
- B15, B45, B65 (at St. John's Place)
- B14 (at Eastern Parkway)
- B12 (at East New York Avenue)
- B17 (on Remsen Avenue)
- B7 (at Kings Highway)
- B35 (at Church Avenue)
- B8 (at Beverley Road/Avenue B)
- B6, B103, BM2 (at Glenwood Road; westbound only)
- B6, B82, B82 SBS (at Flatlands Avenue)
- BM1 (at Avenues K/L)
- B41 (at Avenue N; Bergen Beach only)
- B100 (at Avenues T/U)
- B3 (on Avenue U)
