= B99, Bx99, and M99 buses =

Former bus routes in New York City

B99, Bx99, M99

Overview
- System: MTA New York City Bus
- Operator: New York City Transit Authority
- Garage: Michael J. Quill Depot M99 West Farms Depot BX99 Flatbush Depot B99
- Vehicle: Daimler Chrysler Orion VII; New Flyer Xcelsior XD40; New Flyer Xcelsior XN40; New Flyer Xcelsior XN60; NovaBus LFS Articulated
- Began service: June 28, 2020
- Ended service: June 10, 2021

Route
- Locale: Brooklyn, the Bronx, and Manhattan, New York, U.S.
- Start: B99: Columbus Circle; Bx99: West Village; M99: West 42nd Street Pier
- Via: First Avenue (northbound, Bx99 only); Second Avenue (southbound, Bx99 only); Grand Concourse (Bx99 only); Jerome Avenue (Bx99 only); Eleventh Avenue (southbound, M99 and Bx99); Tenth Avenue (northbound, M99 and Bx99); Ninth Avenue (southbound, B99 only); Eighth Avenue (northbound, B99 only); Flatbush Avenue (M99, B99); Nostrand Avenue (southbound, B99 only); Bedford Avenue (northbound, B99 only); Fulton Street (M99 only)
- End: B99: Midwood; Bx99: Woodlawn; M99: East New York
- Length: B99 SB: 12.3 miles (19.8 km); Bx99 NB: 15.8 miles (25.4 km); M99 SB: 12.9 miles (20.8 km)

Service
- Frequency: every 20 minutes
- Operates: 1:00 a.m. – 6:00 a.m.

The B99, Bx99, and M99 bus routes formed a temporary night bus service in the New York City boroughs of Manhattan, Brooklyn, and the Bronx. The three bus routes were created to replace overnight subway service during the height of COVID-19 pandemic, while the subway system was closed to the public between 1:00 a.m. and 5:00 a.m. All three routes overlapped in Manhattan allowing customers to easily transfer between services.

The M99 and B99 were created on June 28, 2020; the Bx99 was created on August 5, 2020. All routes stopped running on June 10, 2021, after overnight subway service was restored.

== Route descriptions ==
Under normal service patterns, the New York City Subway typically runs 24/7 service. The 2 train usually travels from Wakefield–241st Street in the Bronx to Flatbush Avenue–Brooklyn College in Brooklyn overnight, while the 4 train travels from Woodlawn in the Bronx to New Lots Avenue overnight. (Note: During the daytime, the 4 train travels only to Crown Heights–Utica Avenue in Brooklyn, and the stops between Utica and New Lots Avenues are served by the 3 train.) As a result of the COVID-19 pandemic in New York City, overnight subway service was suspended between 1:00 a.m. and 5:00 a.m. from mid-2020 to mid-2021.

The B99, Bx99, and M99 buses followed routes very similar to the 2 and 4 trains' overnight patterns. The M99 was based out of Michael J. Quill Depot in Midtown, the B99 was based out of East New York Bus Depot in East New York, Brooklyn, and the Bx99 was based out of West Farms Depot in West Farms, Bronx.

=== B99 ===
The B99 originated in Manhattan a block south of Columbus Circle. The bus then traveled southbound via the Ninth and Tenth Avenues Line and northbound via the Eighth Avenue Line before reaching 14th Street. After this the B99 used the 14th Street Crosstown Line until turning onto the Fifth and Sixth Avenues (northbound) and Seventh Avenue (southbound) lines. The B99 then followed Canal Street and went over the Manhattan Bridge, arriving into Brooklyn. The bus then followed Flatbush Avenue, and after briefly using Eastern Parkway, the bus turned onto the Nostrand Avenue Line, laid over on Nostrand Avenue (the B99 used it southbound) and New York Avenue (the B99 used it northbound). The bus ended its route near the 2 train terminus at Flatbush Avenue-Brooklyn College on Avenue H. The B99, as of 2024, is now used for 3 train shuttle bus service between Utica Avenue and New Lots Avenue.

=== Bx99 ===
The Bx99 originated at Spring and Greenwich Streets in Manhattan's West Village. The northbound bus then looped around Spring Street and followed Hudson Street up to 14th Street, while the southbound bus followed Greenwich and West Houston Streets to Seventh Avenue, and then to 14th Street. The Bx99 followed the 14th Street Crosstown Line until using the Ninth and Tenth Avenues Line southbound and Eleventh and Twelfth Avenues Line northbound to 57th Street. The Bx99 then followed the 57th Street Crosstown Line and then the First and Second Avenues Line on First Avenue (northbound) and Second Avenue (southbound), until finally crossing the Third Avenue Bridge (southbound) or Willis Avenue Bridge (northbound), and using East 138th Street to reach Grand Concourse. The Bx99 bus then followed the Grand Concourse Line, for a short distance East Tremont Avenue, and then Jerome Avenue before reaching its final stop at the 4 train terminus Woodlawn in Norwood, Bronx, Bronx.

=== M99 ===
The M99 originated in Manhattan at West 42nd Street Pier near the West Midtown Ferry Terminal and followed 42nd Street for some time before using the Ninth and Tenth Avenues Line southbound and Eleventh and Twelfth Avenues Line northbound until reaching 14th Street. The M99 then used the 14th Street Crosstown Line until turning onto the Fifth and Sixth Avenues (northbound) and Seventh Avenue (southbound) lines. The M99 then followed Canal Street and went over the Manhattan Bridge, arriving into Brooklyn. The bus then traversed Flatbush Avenue and the Fulton Street Line on Fulton Street, and at Rockaway Avenue turned onto the Wilson Avenue Line and then later onto the Sumner and Wilson Avenues Line on New Lots Avenue. The bus terminated at the 4 train terminus at New Lots Avenue in New Lots, Brooklyn.

== History ==
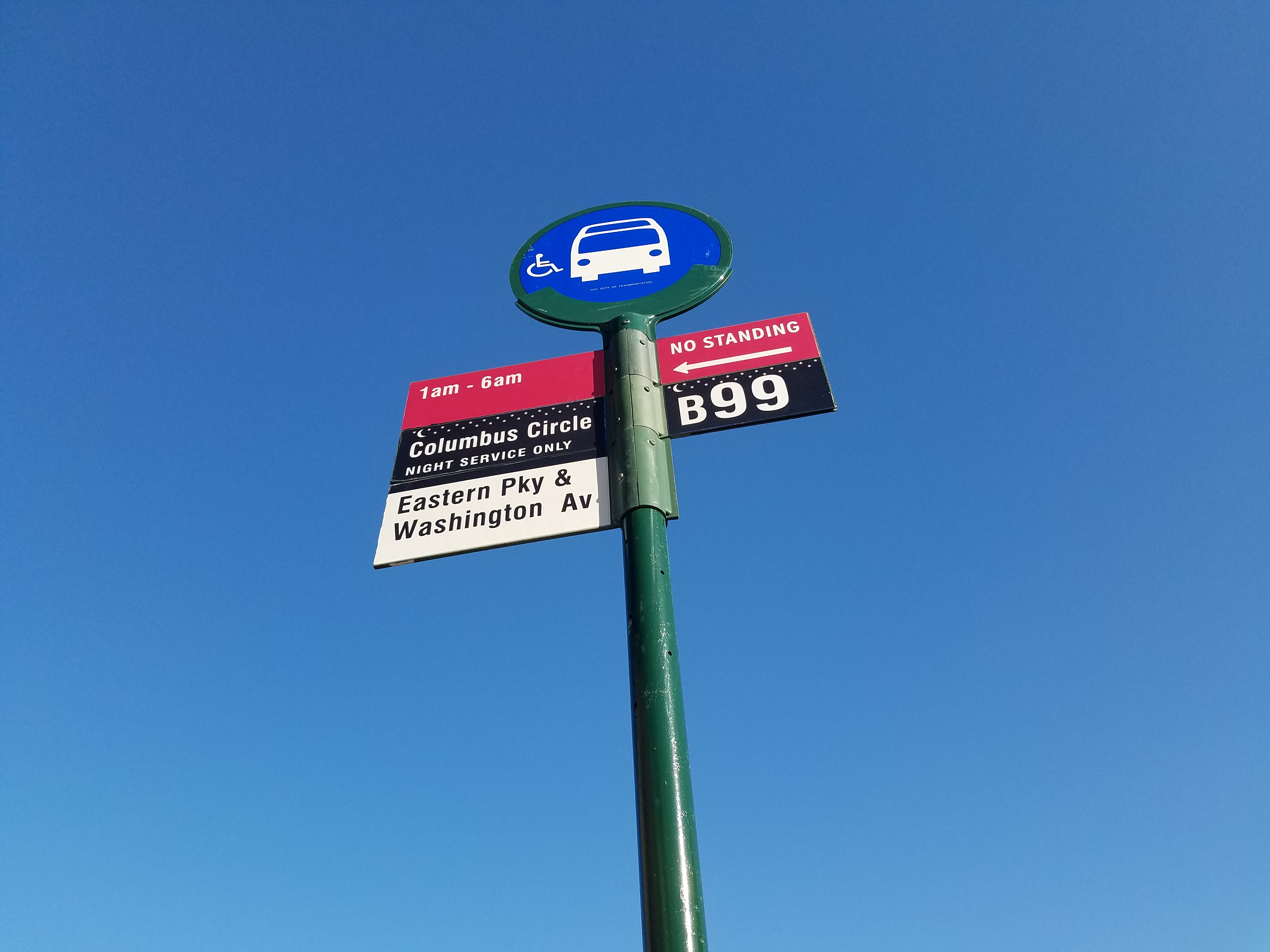
B99 bus stop sign at the intersection of Eastern Parkway and Washington Avenue

After the Metropolitan Transportation Authority of New York cut overnight subway services during the COVID-19 pandemic, mayor Bill de Blasio announced that they would make a new alternative for the 2 and 4 trains overnight. On June 28, 2020, the M99 and B99 routes were created, followed on August 5 by the Bx99. These new bus routes would be free of charge.

When new protective barriers were installed and the Metropolitan Transportation Authority started charging fares again in fall 2020, the B99, Bx99, and M99 buses required a fare to ride as well. Overnight subway service resumed on May 17, 2021. On June 10, B99, Bx99, and M99 bus service was discontinued.
