= Culver Depot =

Former streetcar and railroad terminal in Brooklyn

Coordinates: 40.575235°N 73.973338°W

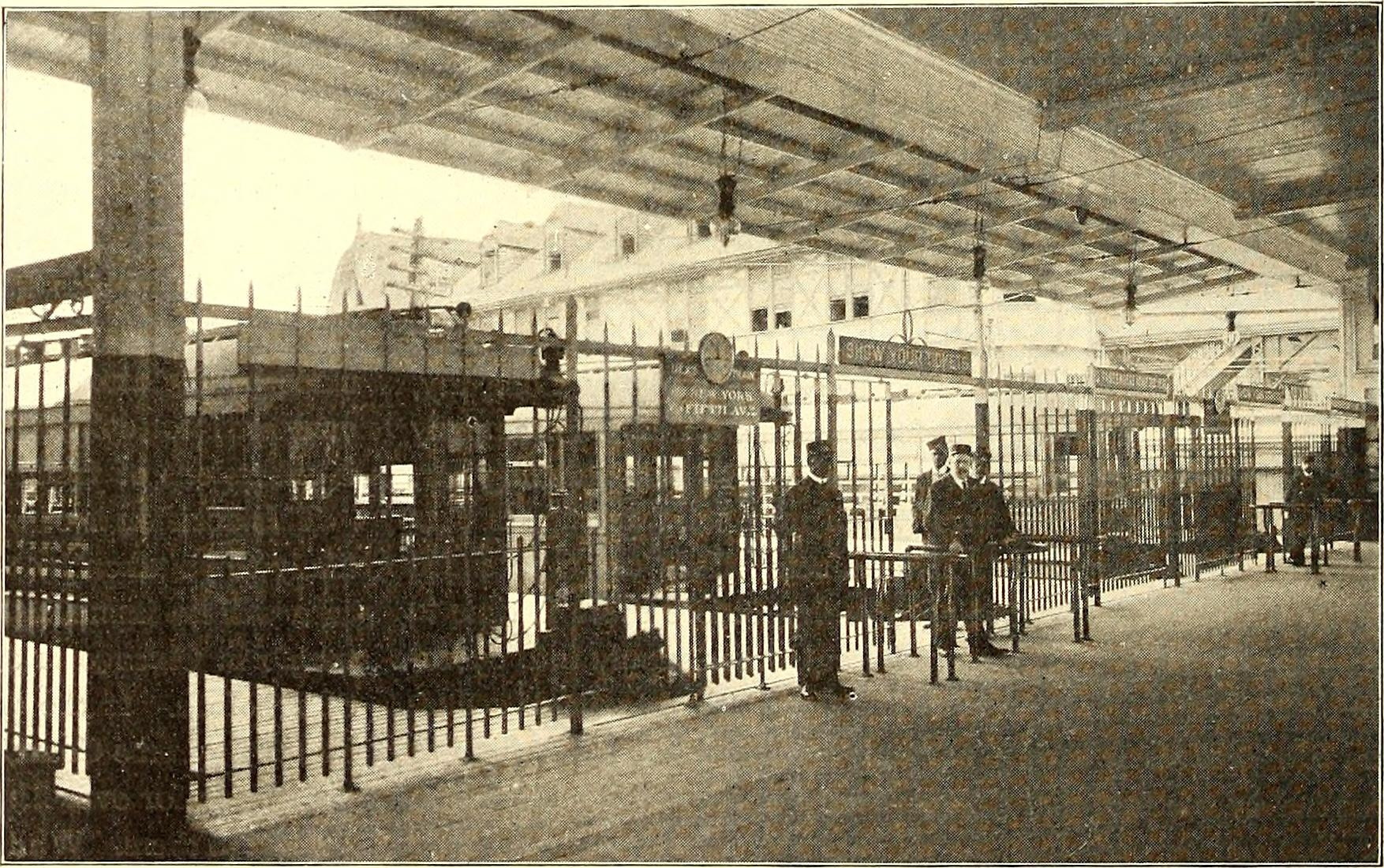
The rapid transit platforms of the Culver Depot after its 1904 renovations, showing the platform gates.

Culver Depot, also called Culver Terminal or Culver Plaza, was a railroad and streetcar terminal in Coney Island, Brooklyn, New York City, United States, located on the northern side of Surf Avenue near West 5th Street. It was just north of the boardwalk, near the former Luna Park amusement complex, and across from the current New York Aquarium. Originally built by the Prospect Park and Coney Island Railroad for the Culver surface line, it later became a major terminal for the Brooklyn Rapid Transit Company (BRT).

== Layout ==
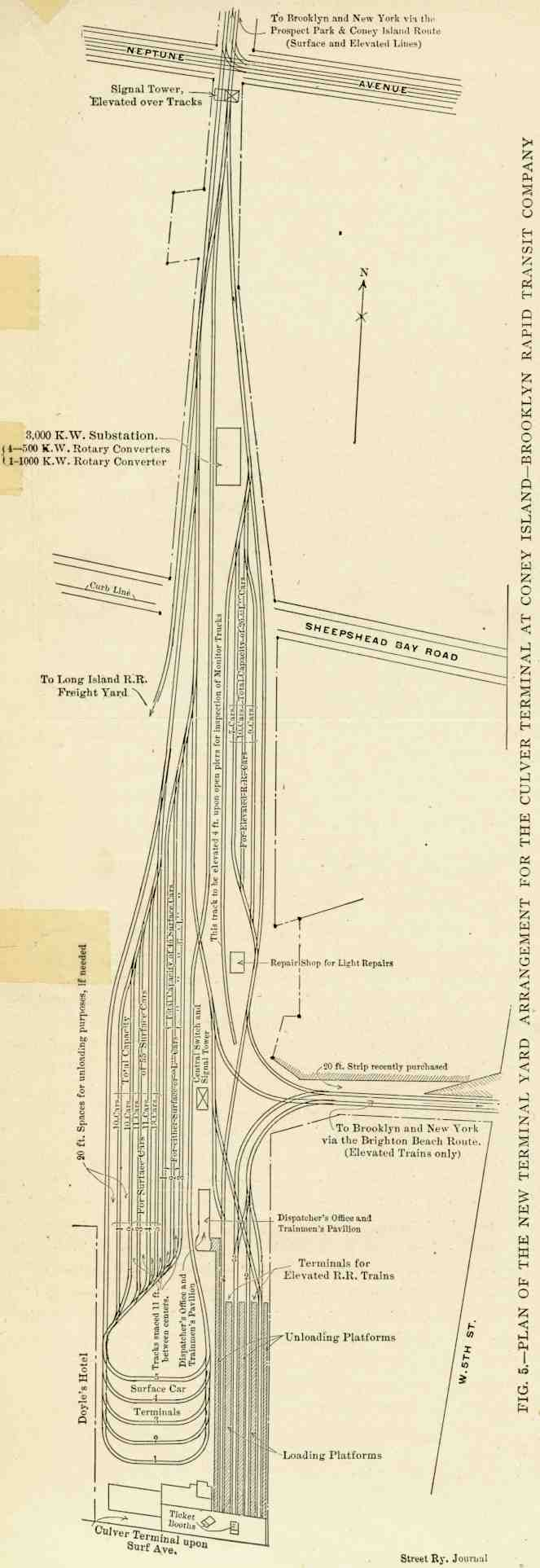
1904 map

The terminal was located at grade-level, at the north side of Surf Avenue. On the east side of the terminal, there were four tracks and five high-level platforms for BRT elevated trains from the Culver and Brighton lines. The two outer platforms were side platforms, while the three inner platforms were island platforms, similar to the former layout of Chambers Street. The outer side platforms and center island platform were for the unloading of passengers, while the western and eastern island platforms were used by outbound passengers, in a Spanish solution layout.

The easternmost two tracks were used by Brighton trains. The westernmost pair were used by Culver trains, which continued north along the Fifth Avenue elevated towards Downtown Brooklyn and City Hall in Manhattan. At the south end of the platforms, gates were present to further segregate inbound and outbound passengers. Passengers were required to purchase tickets before boarding (unlike at other stations, where fares were collected on trains), via ticket booths in the passenger concourse designed to resemble an elevated car cab. At the north end of the elevated station was a dispatchers office, connected to the western outer platform. Further north was a signal and switch tower. On the west side of the depot, there were five balloon loops for terminating streetcars. Additional storage tracks for both elevated trains and streetcars were at the north end of the depot.

=== Transfers and attractions ===
Surface trolley lines which served the depot included the Culver Line, Coney Island Plank Road Line, Smith Street Line, Vanderbilt Avenue Line, Court Street Line, Reid Avenue Line, and Union Street Line.

Across from the station on the south side of Surf Avenue was Culver Plaza, illuminated by gas lights, and lined with grass and flower gardens. It featured several attractions and amenities including a carousel, the Ocean View and Prospect Hotels, and the 300-foot (91 m) Iron Tower or Observation Tower acquired from the 1876 Philadelphia Exposition.

The terminal and plaza were near several Coney Island attractions, most notably the Luna Park and Dreamland amusement parks, the latter of which was located adjacent and south of Culver Plaza on the current New York Aquarium site.

== History ==
The depot was opened on July 27, 1875, to serve trains on the Prospect Park and Coney Island Railroad, a surface railroad popularly known as the Culver Line after its founder and long-time president, Andrew Culver. After the introduction of electric trolley cars on the Culver Line in 1890, trolleys and elevated railway trains both used the station. It originally had only ground-level loading and unloading areas for passengers, shared by both rapid transit and streetcars.

In 1903, following the integration of the Culver line into the Brooklyn Rapid Transit Company's operations, the Brighton Beach Line extended its tracks to access Culver Depot from Brighton Beach to the east. In early 1904, the terminal underwent extensive renovations to increase passenger capacity and speed operations. This included creating separate loading areas for elevated trains and streetcars. Switch and signal upgrades were performed by Union Switch & Signal. Brighton trains left the station in 1919 to use the new elevated terminal at the Coney Island–Stillwell Avenue station, while stopping at the nearby West Eighth Street station. On May 1, 1920, now-elevated Culver trains began using the new terminal, while Culver Depot continued in use only for streetcars and freight from the South Brooklyn Railway. The terminal was razed in January 1923. Plans for new developments on the site included a theater, a stadium, and a commercial block.

The Culver Depot was replaced by the adjacent Coney Island and Brooklyn Railroad depot, which served Culver streetcars until October 30, 1956. This facility was later used by the New York City Transit Authority as a bus depot until it closed on July 27, 1960. The site of Culver Depot is now occupied by some housing projects, specifically the Brightwater Towers and Trump Village West.
