= Andrew Culver =

Andrew Culver may refer to:

- Andrew Culver (composer) (born 1953), American composer
- Andrew Culver (railroad executive) (1832–1906), president of the Prospect Park and Coney Island Railroad (Culver Line)
