= Ninth Avenue Line =

Ninth Avenue Line refers to the following transit lines:

- IRT Ninth Avenue Line, the first elevated railway in New York City, opened 1868 as the West Side and Yonkers Patent Railway, closed 1940
- Ninth Avenue Line (Brooklyn surface), a portion of the Vanderbilt Avenue Line, a former streetcar line along Ninth Avenue (now Prospect Park West); now a bus line with this section rerouted to 7th Avenue
- Ninth Avenue Line (Manhattan surface), a streetcar line that opened in 1859, replaced by a bus route in 1935
