= B69 =

B69 may refer to:

- Tividale (village post code B69)
- Bundesstraße 69, a German road
- B69 (New York City bus) in Brooklyn
- Sicilian, Richter-Rauzer, Rauzer attack, 7...a6 defence, 11.Bxf6, Encyclopaedia of Chess Openings code

B-69 may refer to:

- B-69 Neptune, an American aircraft
