= West Eighth Street–New York Aquarium station =

New York City Subway station in Brooklyn

West 8 Street–New York Aquarium
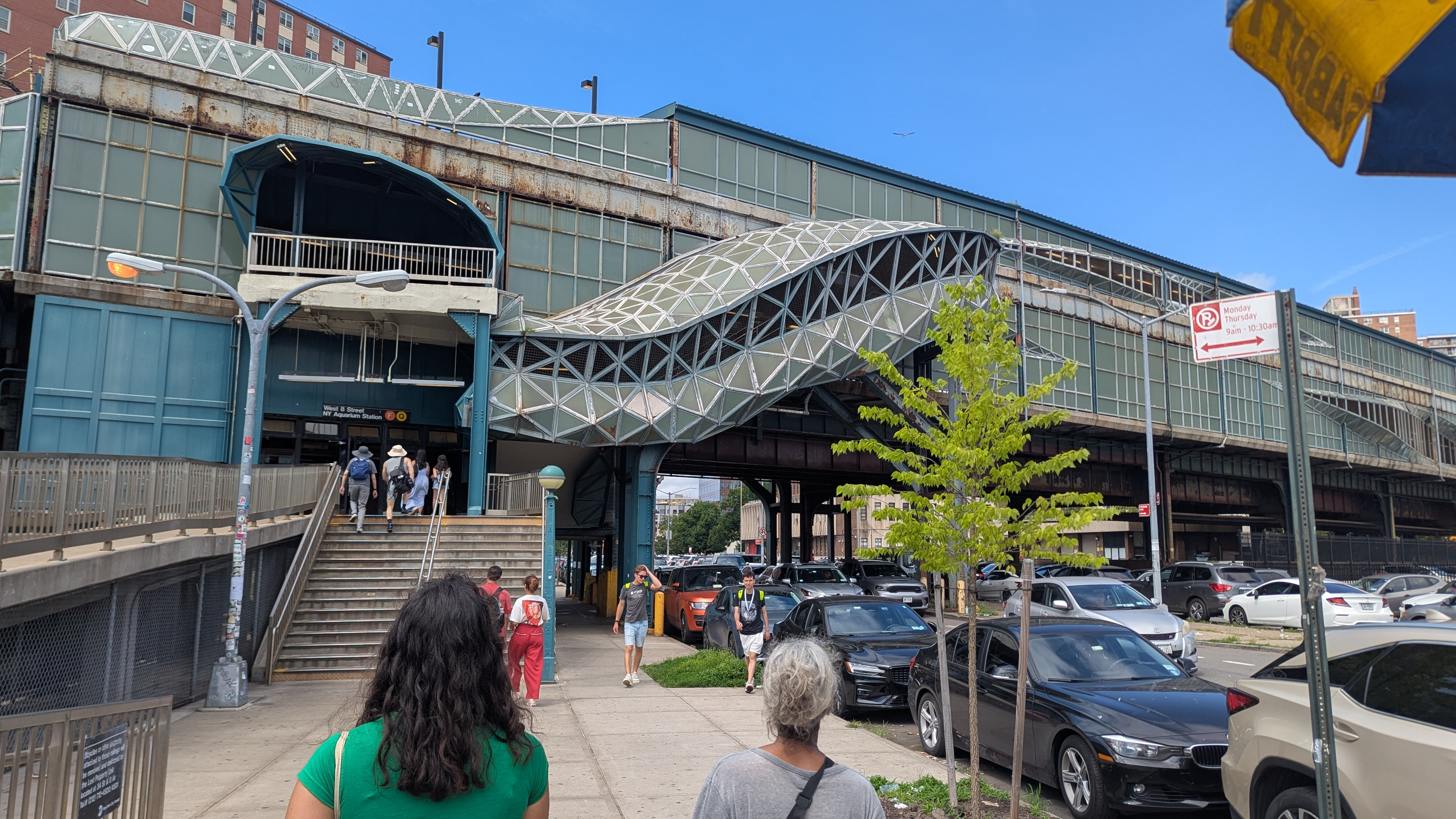
- View of the station from Surf Avenue

Station statistics
- Address: West 8th Street near Surf Avenue; Brooklyn, New York
- Borough: Brooklyn
- Locale: Coney Island
- Coordinates: 40°34′34.24″N 73°58′32.88″W
- Division: B (BMT/IND)
- Line: BMT Brighton Line; IND Culver Line; BMT Culver Line (formerly)
- Services: F (all times) <F> (two rush hour trains, peak direction); Q (all times)
- Transit: NYCT Bus: B36, B68
- Structure: Elevated
- Levels: 2
- Platforms: 4 side platforms (2 on each level)
- Tracks: 4 (2 on each level)

Other information
- Opened: May 19, 1919; 107 years ago
- Former/other names: Coney Island–West Eighth Street

Traffic
- 2025: 679,646 ▲11.9%
- Rank: 355 out of 423
Services
Preceding station	New York City Subway	Following station
Ocean Parkway Q toward 96th Street	Local	Coney Island–Stillwell Avenue F <F> Q Terminus
Neptune Avenue F <F> toward Jamaica–179th Street	Local	Coney Island–Stillwell Avenue F <F> Q Terminus
Location
Location within New York City Subway
Location within New York City
Location within New York
Track layout
Upper level
Lower level
Street map
Station service legend
Symbol	Description
Stops all times	Stops all times
Stops rush hours in the peak direction only (limited service)	Stops rush hours in the peak direction only (limited service)
Stops weekdays and weekday late nights	Stops weekdays and weekday late nights

The West Eighth Street–New York Aquarium station (formerly Coney Island–West Eighth Street station) is a New York City Subway station, located on the BMT Brighton Line and IND Culver Line in the Coney Island neighborhood of Brooklyn. The station is located over the private right-of-way of the defunct New York and Coney Island Railroad north of Surf Avenue, running easterly from West 8th Street. It is served by the F and Q trains at all times, and by the <F> train during rush hours in the peak direction. This station is geographically the southernmost station in the entire New York City Subway system.

== History ==
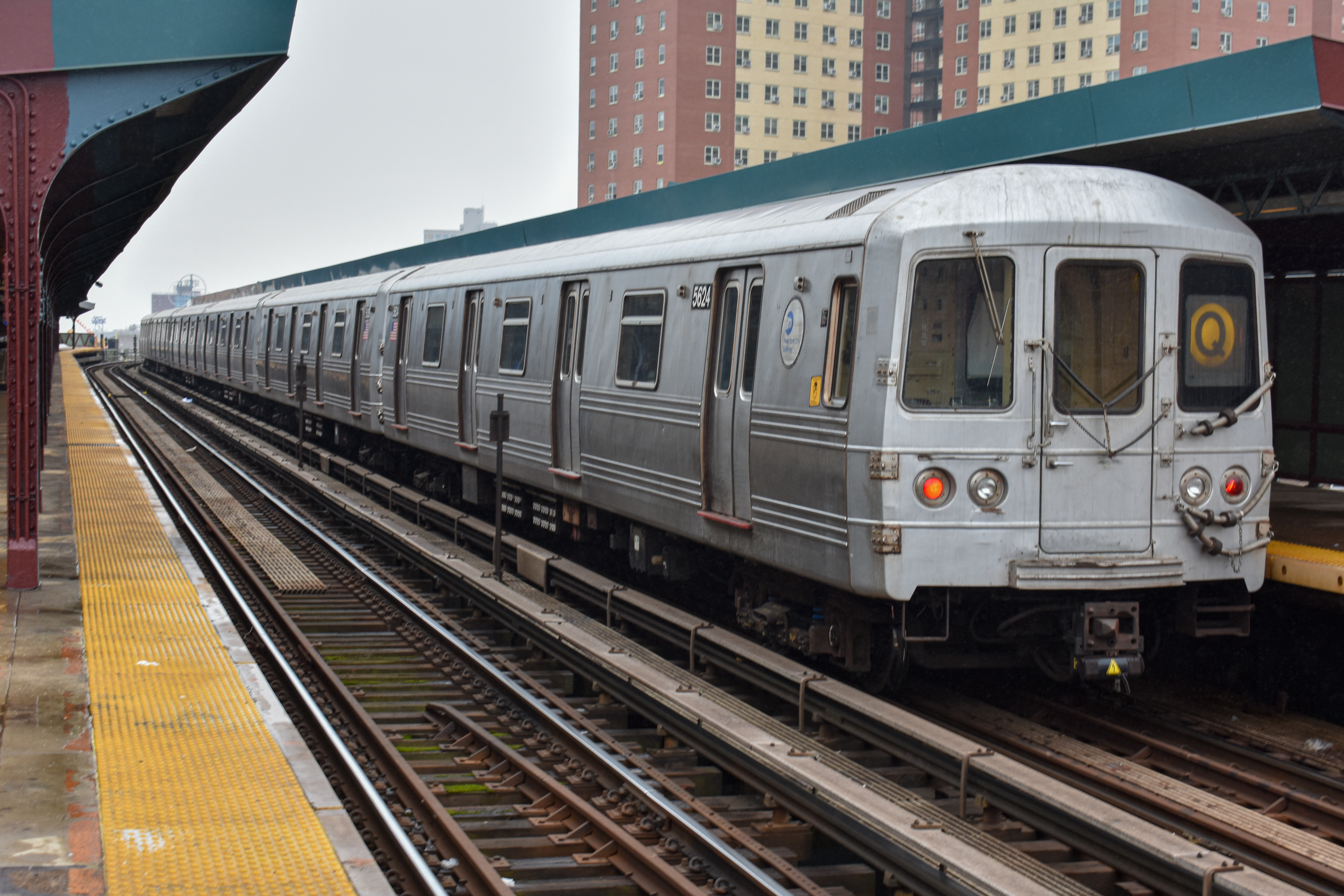
An R46 Q train on the upper level

The station, originally identified as Coney Island–West Eighth Street, replaced the Culver Depot, the surface terminus of the Brighton Beach and Culver Lines. The new station consisted of a two-level elevated line, with two tracks and two side platforms on each level. Brighton service began serving the station on June 13, 1919, with Brighton Local trains using the lower level and Brighton Express trains (when operated) using the upper level. On May 1, 1920, Culver trains began sharing the lower level with the Brighton Line.

The usage of both levels varied over the years, with different Brighton services using the lower level at different times. Brighton Locals used the lower level of West 8th Street until 1954, when the track connection between the Brighton Line at Ocean Parkway and the lower level of West 8th Street station was severed. Brighton and Culver trains have had exclusive use of their respective levels ever since. The structure for the connector tracks still exists.

In September 1954, the NYCTA announced that it would build a 700 feet (210 m)-long overpass connecting the station with the then proposed New York Aquarium. The estimated cost for the project was $500,000, and it was expected to be completed by November 1955.

In 2002, it was announced that West Eighth Street would be one of ten subway stations citywide to receive renovations. The station was closed in August 2002 in conjunction with the reconstruction of the Coney Island–Stillwell Avenue terminal, and service was restored on May 23, 2004. The renovation took place during the temporary closure.

The pedestrian bridge was torn down on August 8, 2013, due to safety issues. A crosswalk and widened sidewalks replaced the bridge, which was built when the New York Aquarium was first opened at that location. In 2024, the MTA announced that it would install low platform fences at the West Eighth Street–New York Aquarium station and at the Clark Street station to reduce the likelihood of passengers falling onto the tracks. The barriers would consist of low yellow fences, spaced along the length of the platform; there would not be sliding platform screen doors between the barriers.

== Station layout ==
The current station continues to have two tracks and two side platforms on each level; the BMT Brighton Line currently uses the upper level and the IND Culver Line uses the lower level.

The 2005 artwork here is called Wavewall by Vito Acconci.

=== Exits ===
This station contains two entrances. The first one is located on West Eighth Street, on the west end of the station. It has a full-time station agent booth and a ramp to the mezzanine, where there are turnstiles and stairs to the platforms. There are also two stairs that lead from the mezzanine down to the west side of West Eighth Street.

The second one leads to the intersection of West Fifth Street and Brighton Avenue, past the east end of the station. It contains three High Entry-Exit turnstiles and leads directly to the Manhattan-bound platform of the lower level, as well as an escalator that leads directly to the Manhattan-bound platform of the upper level. The eastern entrance also connects to a path running northward to West Sixth Street, which at this point is a dirt road only for pedestrians that runs directly underneath the Culver Line.

== Gallery ==
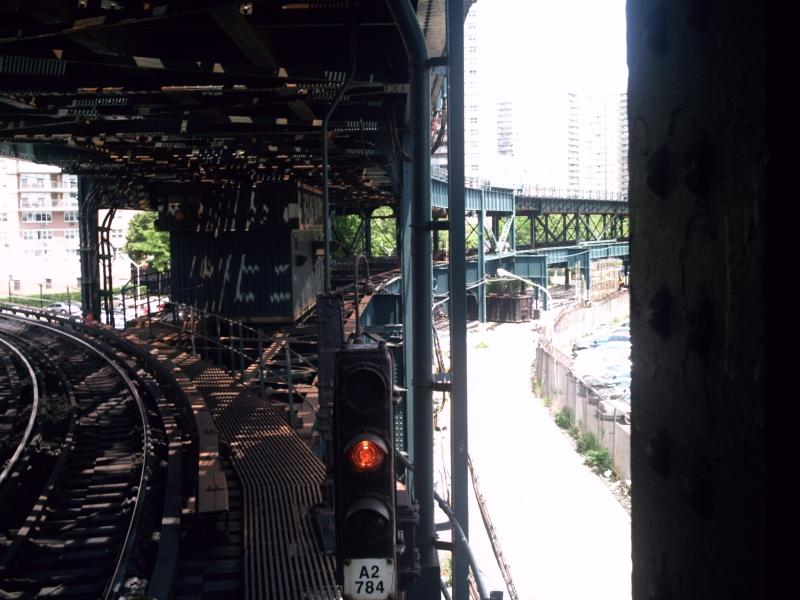
Abandoned trackways from lower level of station to the BMT Brighton Line

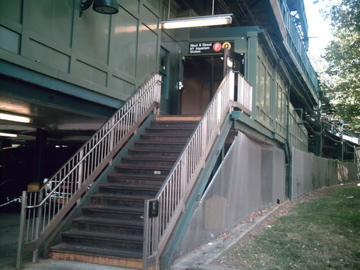
Entrance from West 8th Street

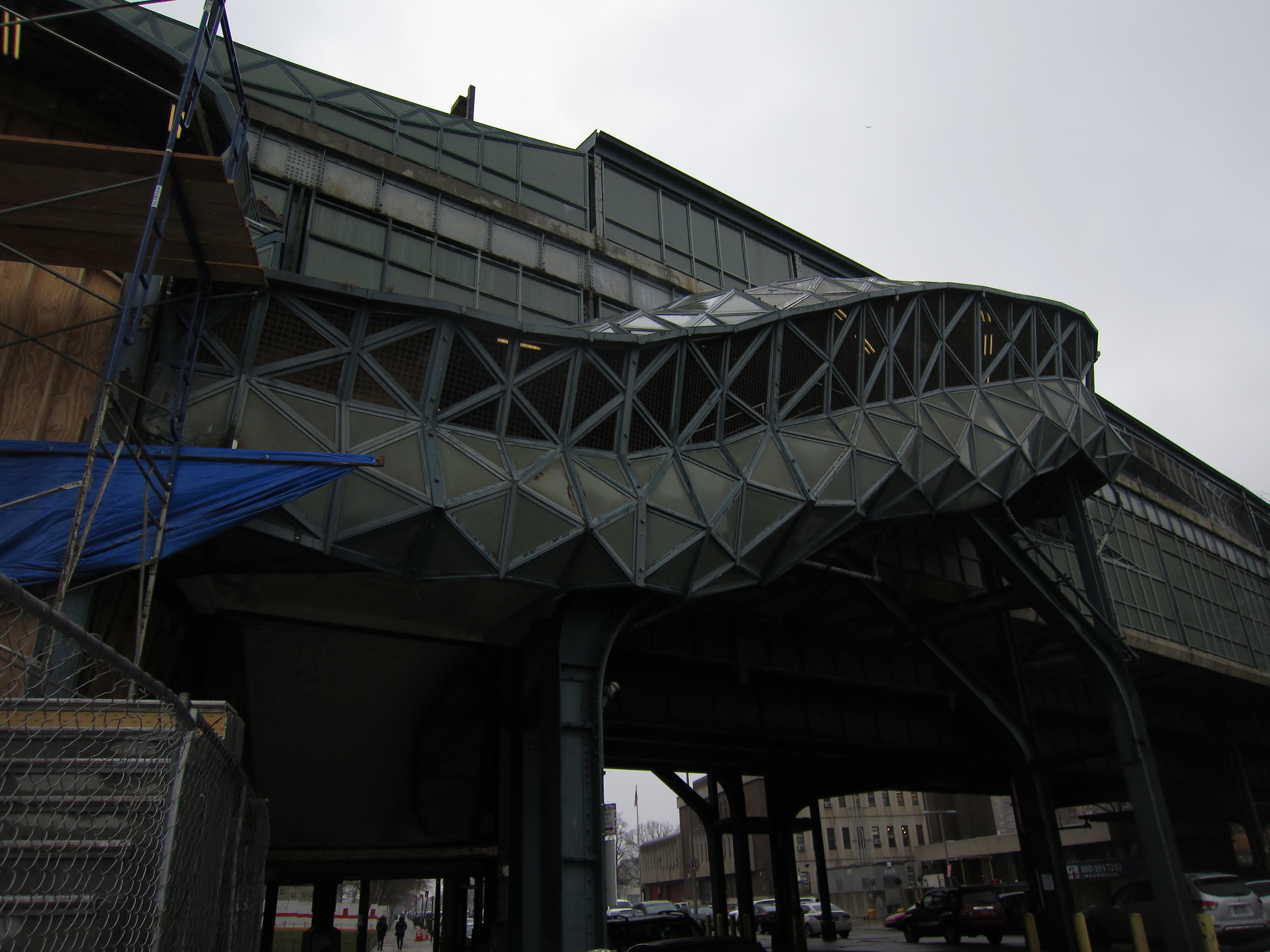
Zoom on the staircase by Vito Acconci

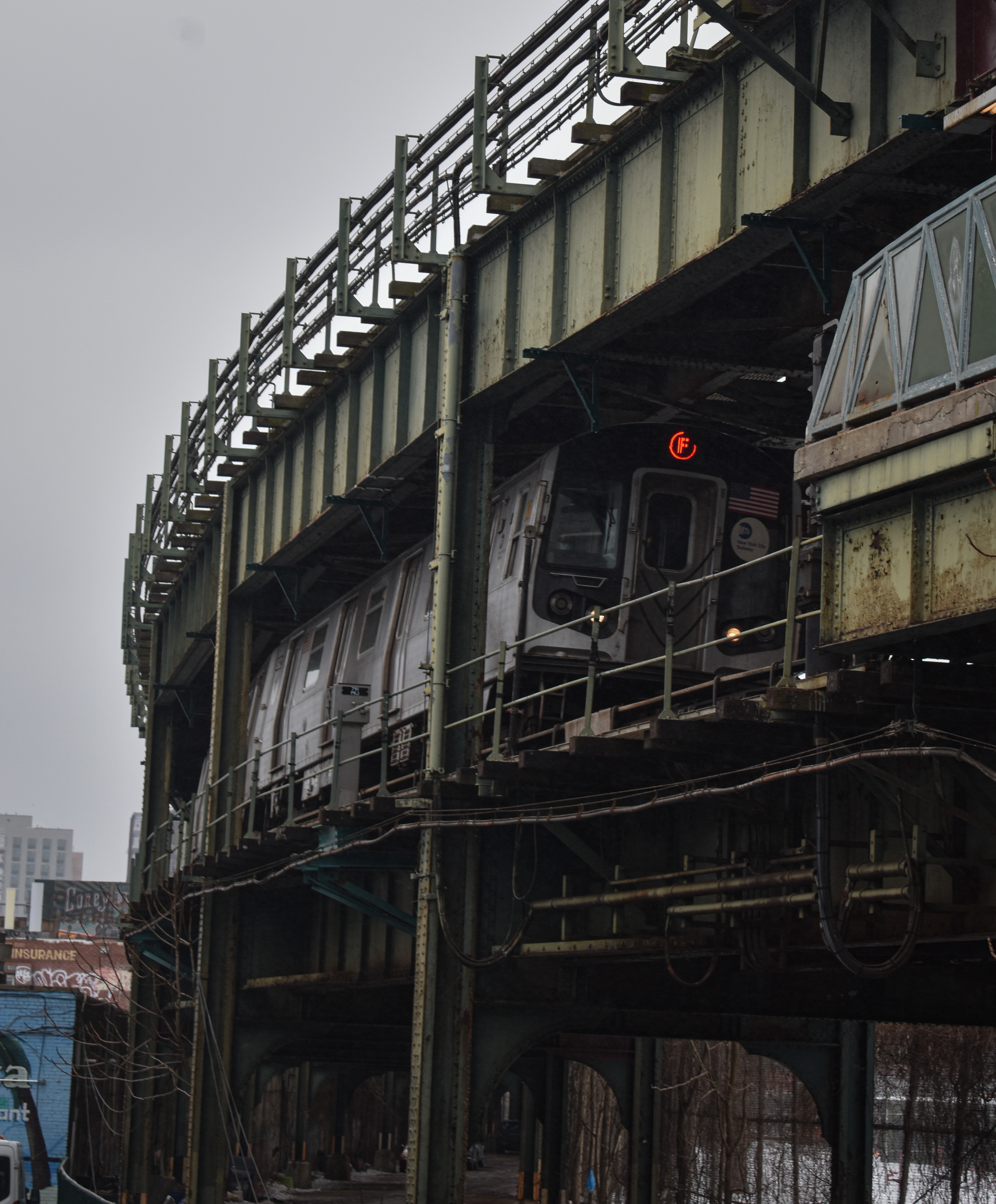
Manhattan-bound F train of R160s enters the station

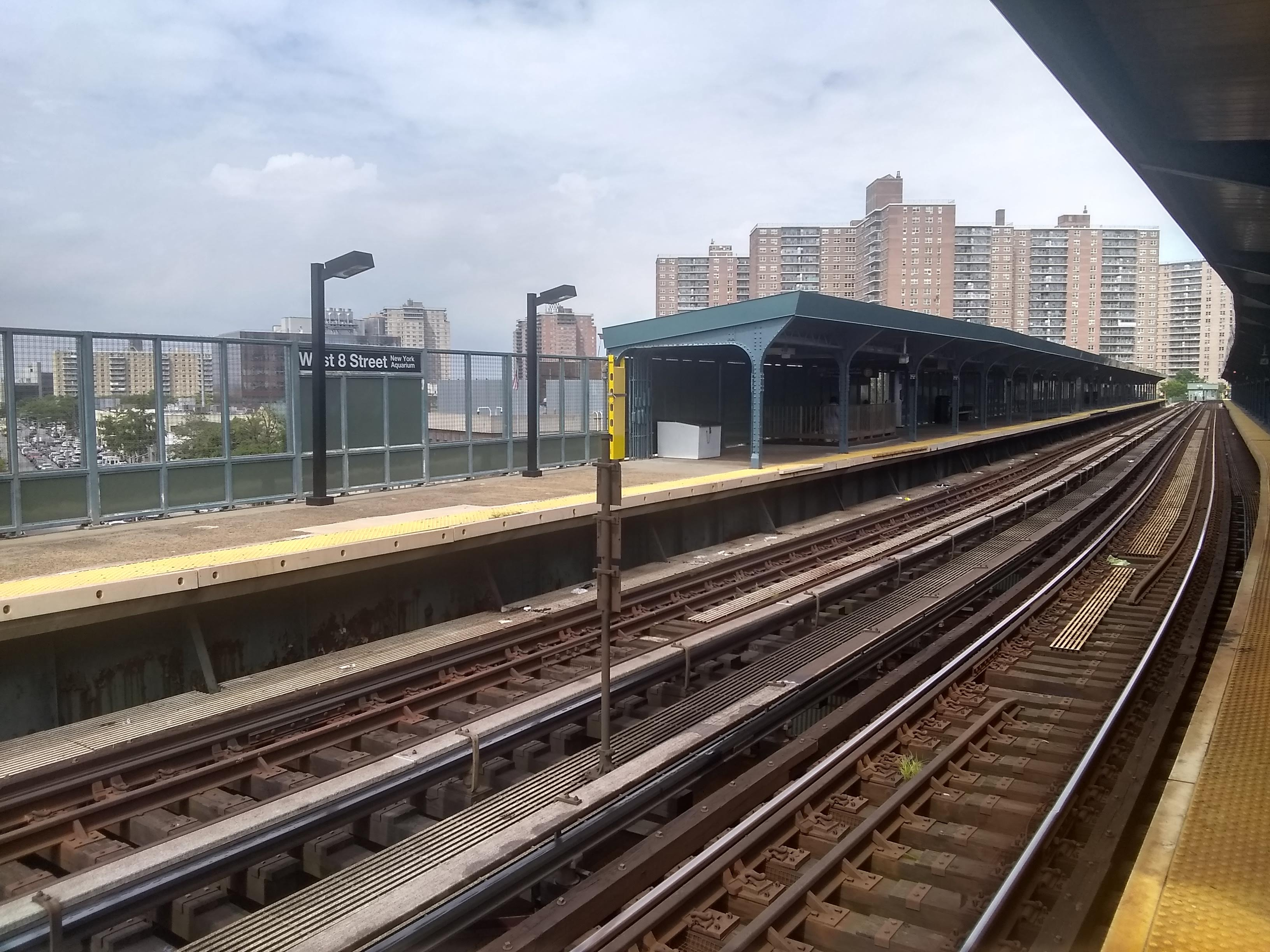
The Brighton Line platforms on the upper level

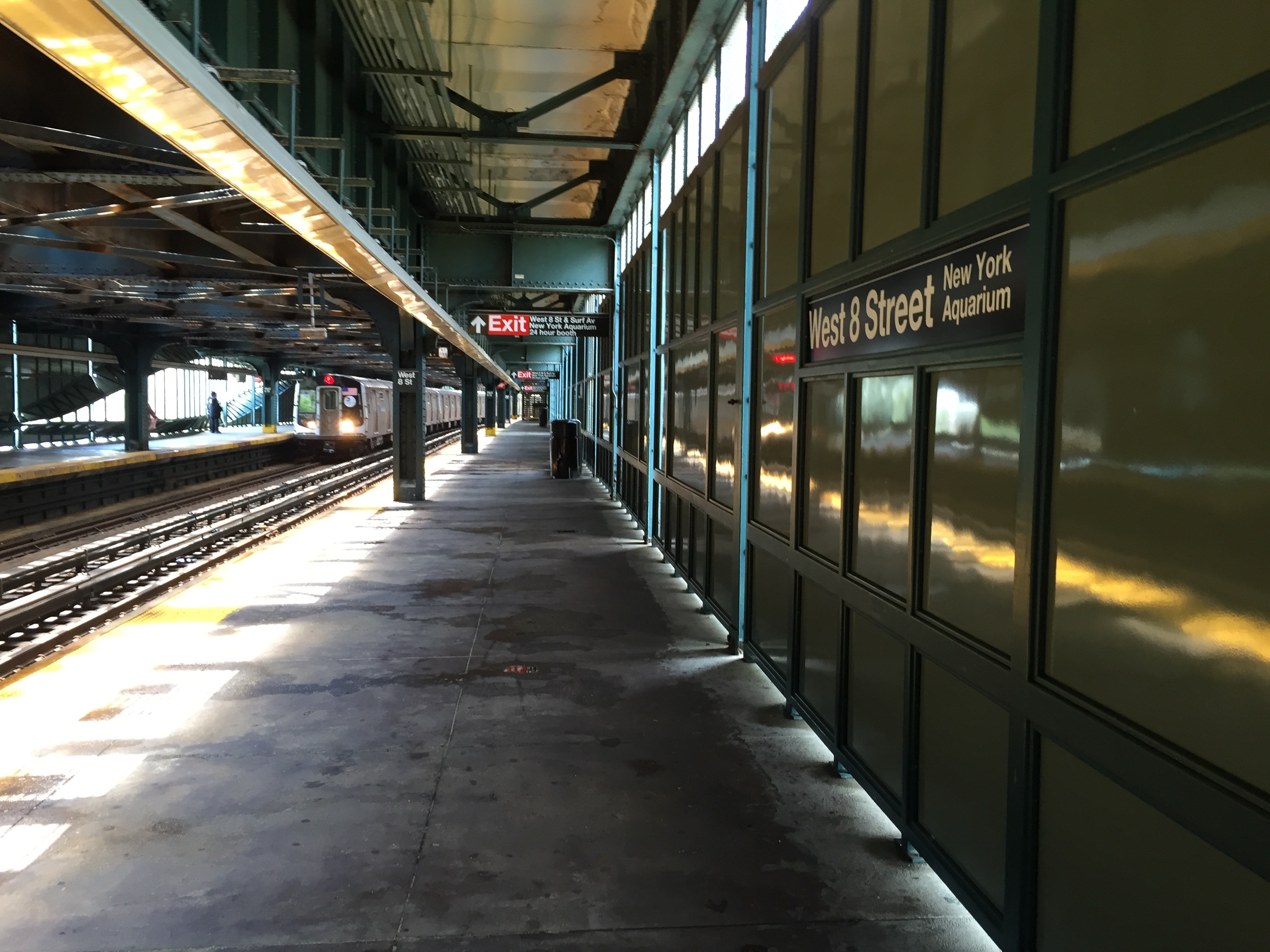
The Culver Line platforms on the lower level

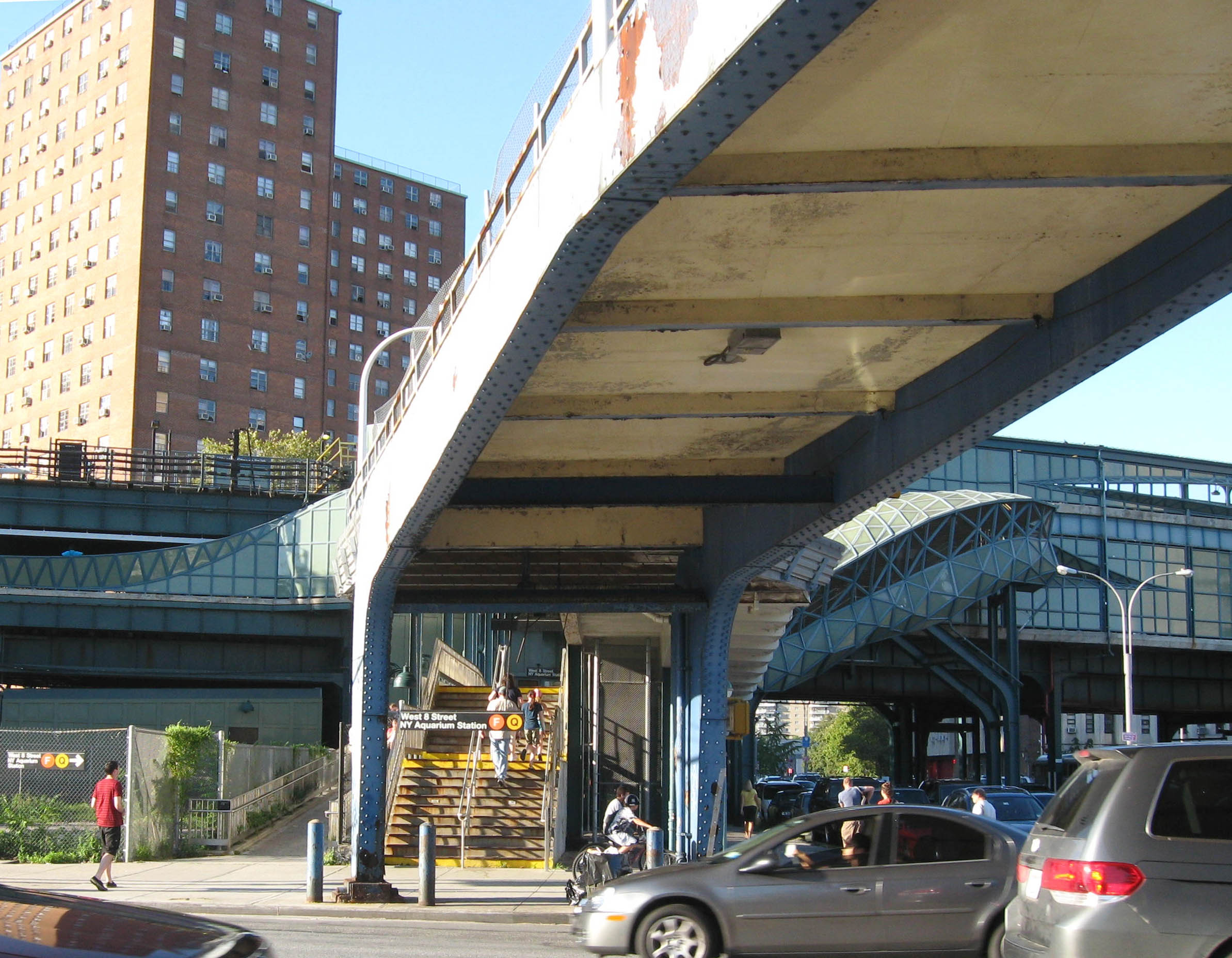
Street stair and pedestrian overpass to Aquarium, demolished in August 2013
