= Trump Village =

Residential complex in Brooklyn, New York

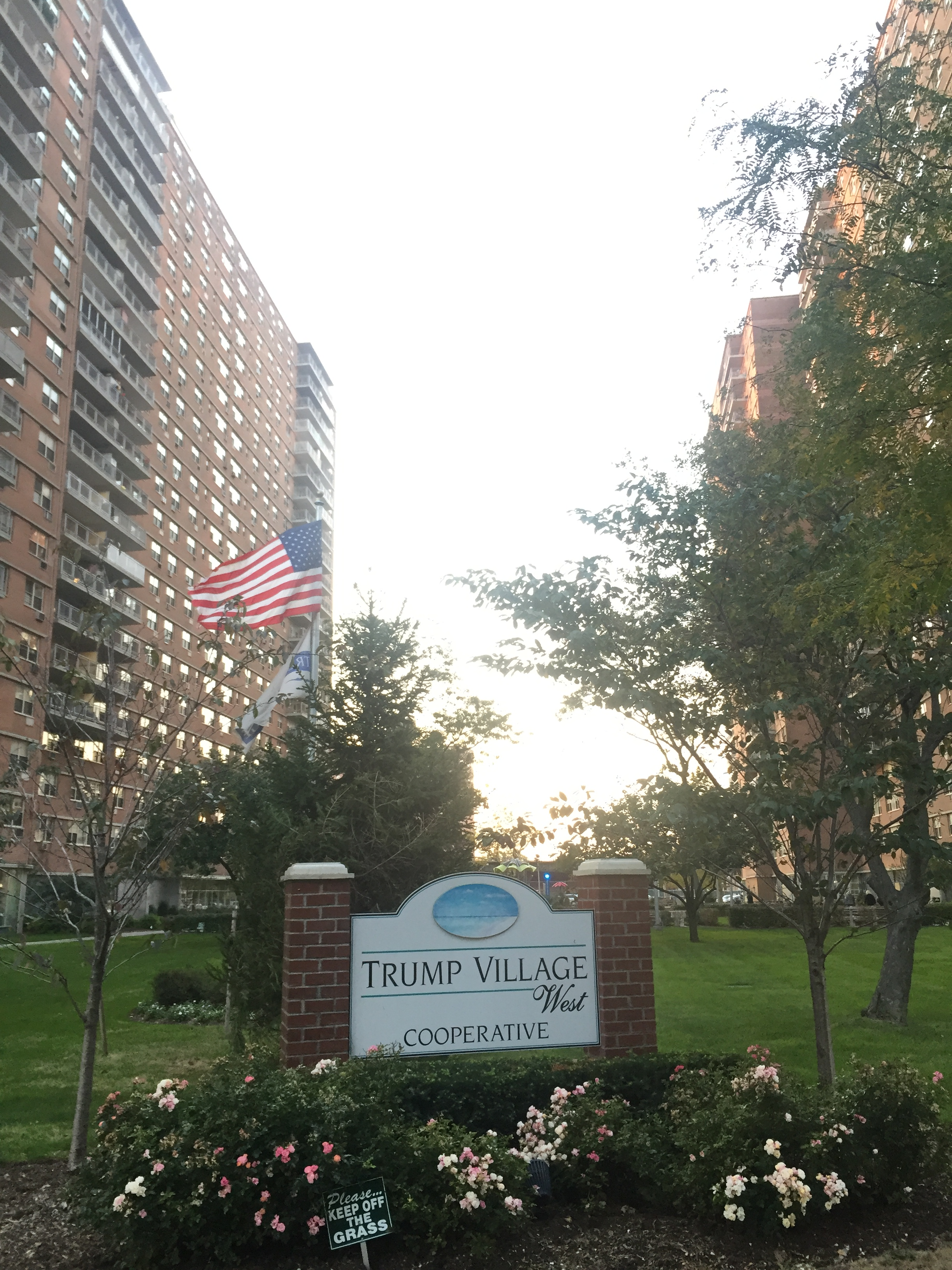
- Interactive map of the Trump Village area

General information
- Type: Residential
- Location: Coney Island, Brooklyn, New York, U.S.
- Coordinates: 40.57828°N 73.97358°W
- Completed: 1963–1964

Design and construction
- Architect: Morris Lapidus
- Developer: Fred Trump

Trump Village is a seven-building cooperative apartment complex in the Coney Island neighborhood of Brooklyn in New York City, New York.

== History ==
The apartment complex was built in 1963–1964 and developed by Fred Trump, the father of Donald Trump. The complex, built on the site of the former Culver Depot, was designed by architect Morris Lapidus.

The construction cost US$70 million. It was supported by the New York State Housing Finance Agency through public bonds issued by the state of New York, coupled with tax exemption. Five out of the seven buildings were Housing cooperatives while the other two were rental apartment buildings under the Mitchell Lama affordable housing program, which in 2007 exited the program and privatized into market rate luxury housing. After the housing development left the Mitchell Lama program, there was a significant increase of grievances being filed from the remaining residents who had moved in under the original affordable housing program about mistreatment from the housing staff and the loss of government ombudsman monitor over tenant rights protections they once could access when it was a government contracted housing development.

It is the only Trump-branded building complex named by Fred Trump rather than his son Donald.
