= IND Culver Line =

New York City Subway line

- The F and <F> trains serve the entire length of the IND Culver Line. The G train serves the line between Bergen Street and Church Avenue.

Overview
- Owner: City of New York
- Locale: Brooklyn, New York City
- Termini: North of Jay Street–MetroTech; Coney Island–Stillwell Avenue
- Stations: 21

Service
- Type: Rapid transit
- System: New York City Subway
- Operator: New York City Transit Authority
- Daily ridership: 106,084 (2023)

History
- Opened: March 16, 1919; 107 years ago
- Last extension: 1954

Technical
- Num of tracks: 2–4
- Character: Underground and elevated
- Track gauge: 4 ft 8 1/2 in (1,435 mm) standard gauge
- Electrification: 600 V DC third rail
Route map
Express station	Local station	Closed station

The IND Culver Line (formerly BMT Culver Line) is a rapid transit line of the B Division of the New York City Subway, extending from Downtown Brooklyn south to Coney Island, Brooklyn, New York City, United States. The local tracks of the Culver Line are served by the F service, as well as the G between Bergen Street and Church Avenue. The express tracks north of Church Avenue are used by the <F> train during rush hours in the peak direction. The peak-direction express track between Ditmas Avenue and Avenue X has not seen regular service since 1987.

The line is named after Andrew Culver, who built the original Culver Line that preceded the current subway line. The present-day line was built as two unconnected segments operated by the Independent Subway System (IND) and Brooklyn–Manhattan Transit Corporation (BMT). The northern section of the line, between Jay Street–MetroTech and Church Avenue, is a four-track line that was built for the IND in 1933, running primarily underground except for a short elevated section over the Gowanus Canal.

The southern section, between Ditmas Avenue and Coney Island–Stillwell Avenue, was originally built for the BMT in 1919–1920 as a three-track elevated structure between Ninth Avenue in Sunset Park and Avenue X, and as a two-track elevated structure south of Avenue X. A ramp in the neighborhood of Kensington, which opened in 1954, connects the segments between the Church and Ditmas Avenues stations. The segment of the BMT line between Ninth and Ditmas Avenues remained as the Culver Shuttle until it was closed in 1975 and later demolished.

The elevated part of the Culver Line south of Church Avenue, which operated as part of the BMT until 1954, now carries only the F, a former IND service, and is chained and signaled as part of the IND. However, BMT radio frequency B1 is used on the elevated portion south of Church Avenue.

== Extent and service ==
The following services use part or all of the IND Culver Line:

Route		Services		
	Time period	North of Bergen St	Between Bergen St and Church Ave	South of Church Ave
"F" train	all times	local		
"F" express train	rush hours in the peak direction	express		local
"G" train	all times	No service	local	No service

The Culver Line is served by the F as a local for its entire length, though <F> trains run express between Jay Street and Church Avenue in the peak direction. The portion of the route from Bergen Street south to Church Avenue is also served by the G Brooklyn–Queens Crosstown service. Both routes run at all times.

There are two express tracks on the northern part of the route and one on the southern, with express stations distributed along the line. However, express service has only been operated on the line from 1968 to 1987, as well as since 2019. Restoration of express service has been thwarted by budget shortages, passenger opposition, and a serious signal fire at Bergen Street in 1999. The issue came to a head in June 2007, when a petition for express service reached 2,600 signatures and gained media attention. The Culver Line underwent repairs from 2009 until early 2013, during which the express tracks were replaced and rehabilitated to facilitate future express service.

=== Jay Street to Church Avenue ===
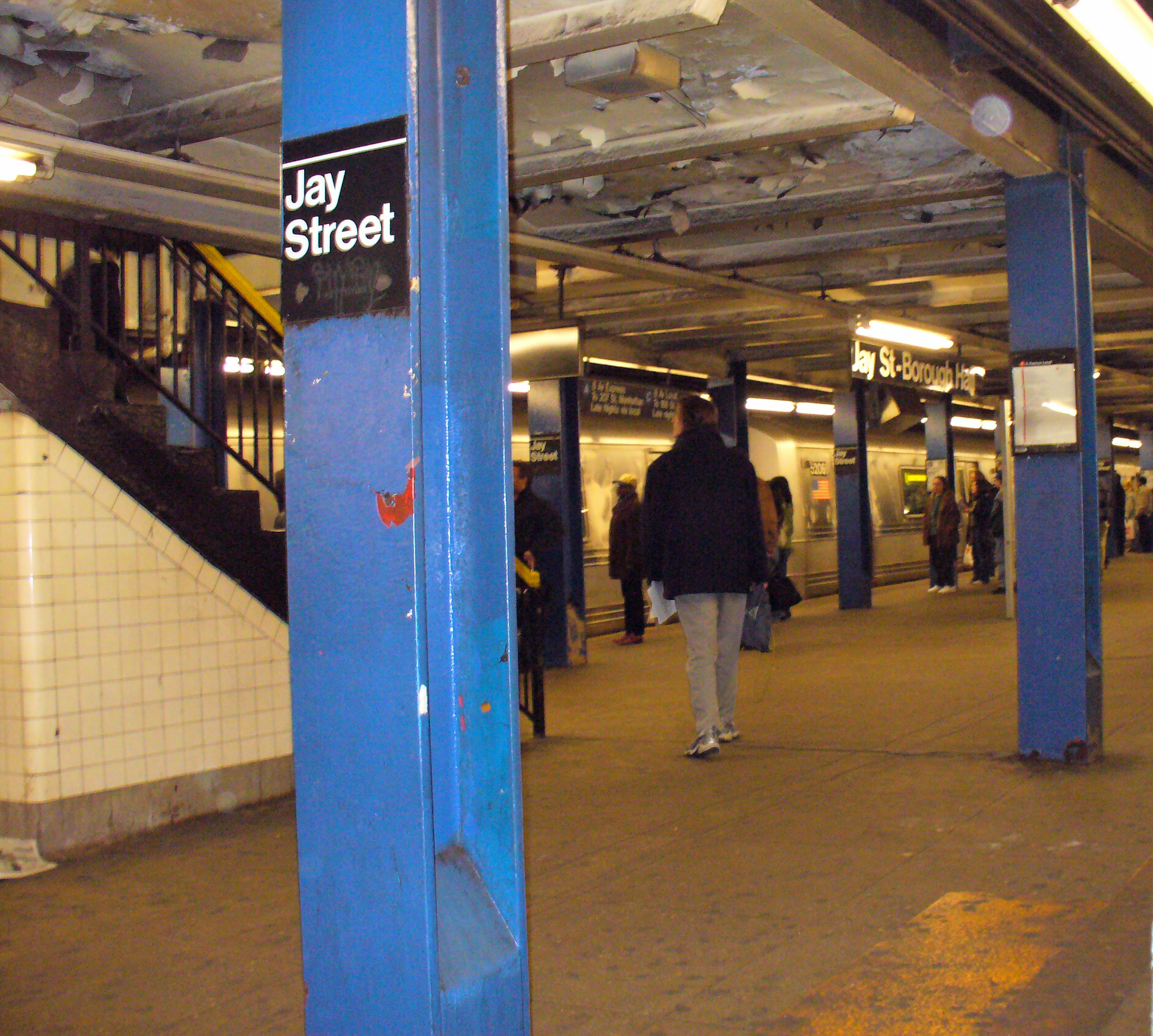
Jay Street – MetroTech

The subway portion of the IND Culver Line was originally designated the Brooklyn Line but has also been called the Smith Street Line, Church Avenue Line, South Brooklyn Line, and various other names. The express tracks beneath Prospect Park are sometimes referred to as the Prospect Park Line.

The line begins at the four-tracked Jay Street–MetroTech station, where the IND Sixth Avenue and Eighth Avenue lines interchange and continue as the Culver and Fulton Street lines respectively. Running under Smith Street south of the station, the Culver tracks split into local and express tracks, with the two express tracks ramping down to the lower level of Bergen Street, while the local tracks merge with the IND Crosstown Line tracks from Hoyt-Schermerhorn Street before entering the upper level. Between Jay Street and Bergen Street, the line passes under both the IRT Eastern Parkway Line and the Fulton Line tracks curving east into Hoyt-Schermerhorn Street, requiring a deeper tunnel and extensive ventilation systems.

At Carroll Street, the express tracks ramp up to rejoin the local tracks, and all four tracks rise onto the Culver Viaduct, curving onto Ninth Street. East of Fourth Avenue station towards Park Slope, the tracks become a subway once again. Past 7th Avenue, the local tracks diverge, curving south to 15th Street and Prospect Park West, while the express tracks take a direct route beneath Prospect Park. This is one of two places in the subway where the express tracks diverge from the local tracks, the other being on the IND Queens Boulevard Line between 65th Street and 36th Street. The express tracks rejoin the right-of-way at approximately Terrace Place and Prospect Avenue, running on a lower level under Prospect Avenue and Fort Hamilton Parkway near the Prospect Park Parade Grounds, then rise up as the line curves onto McDonald Avenue. The line then parallels the route of the original Culver Line surface railroad into Church Avenue station, the last stop of the original IND service.

A single track in both directions, connecting from the local and express tracks in each direction, then ramps down to the four-track Church Avenue Yard, used as a relay and storage facility for G trains. The four mainline tracks ascend to the Culver Ramp on McDonald Avenue between Cortelyou Road and Avenue C, which connects the subway portion of the IND Culver Line with the former BMT Culver Line elevated structure. Despite being a part of the IND Division, the Culver elevated portion is controlled by BMT radio dispatch, so train operators change between the IND (B-2) and BMT (B-1) radio frequencies at this point.

==== Culver Viaduct ====
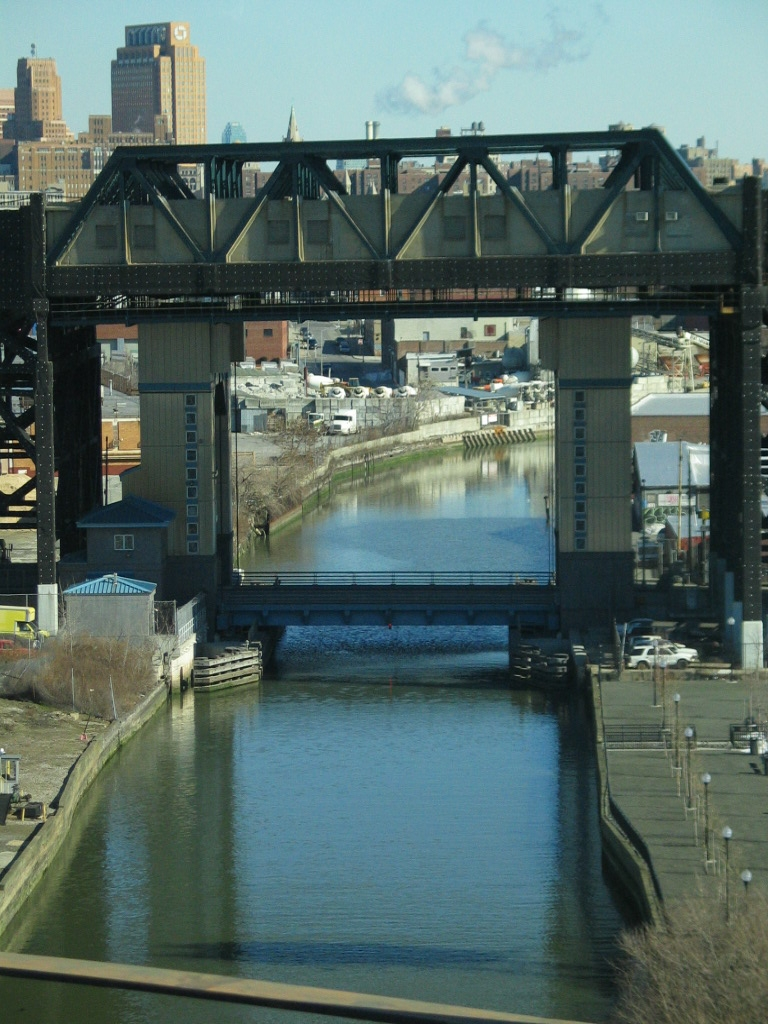
The Culver Viaduct spans the Gowanus Canal.

The northern section of the Culver Line is a four-track line, entirely underground except for Smith–Ninth Streets and Fourth Avenue stations. The two stations sit on a massive one-mile long steel and concrete viaduct which spans the Gowanus Canal between 9th and 10th Streets. This structure is now referred to as the Culver Viaduct or Culver Line Viaduct, the only portion of the original IND subway to be elevated, and the only section other than the now-demolished World's Fair Railroad to be outdoors. The viaduct was constructed due to the depth of the canal (15 feet at its deepest point), due to the topography of the Park Slope neighborhood, and to avoid local stores in the area. Otherwise, a tunnel carrying the line would have to have been built below both the canal and the BMT Fourth Avenue Line (necessitating stations deep below the ground); or Ninth Street would be raised above grade level to pass over the canal and BMT subway.

Both underground options were considered expensive and impractical, and the viaduct was estimated to save $12 million in construction costs when it was selected in 1927. During planning, the viaduct's height was later increased from 60 feet (18 m) to around 90 feet (27 m), due to now-defunct navigation regulations for tall-mast shipping. Because of this, Smith–Ninth Streets was built at an elevation of 87.5 feet (26.7 m), the highest subway station above ground level in the world. Fourth Avenue, meanwhile, is actually at a lower elevation and altitude than the Seventh Avenue underground station.

For most of its history, G service has terminated at Smith–Ninth Streets, relaying using the express tracks and switches at Fourth Avenue. This occasionally caused delays to F service, and prevented express service from being operated. In 2009, the G's terminus was moved to Church Avenue in order to complete renovations on the viaduct. In July 2012, the G extension was made permanent.

=== Ditmas Avenue to Coney Island ===
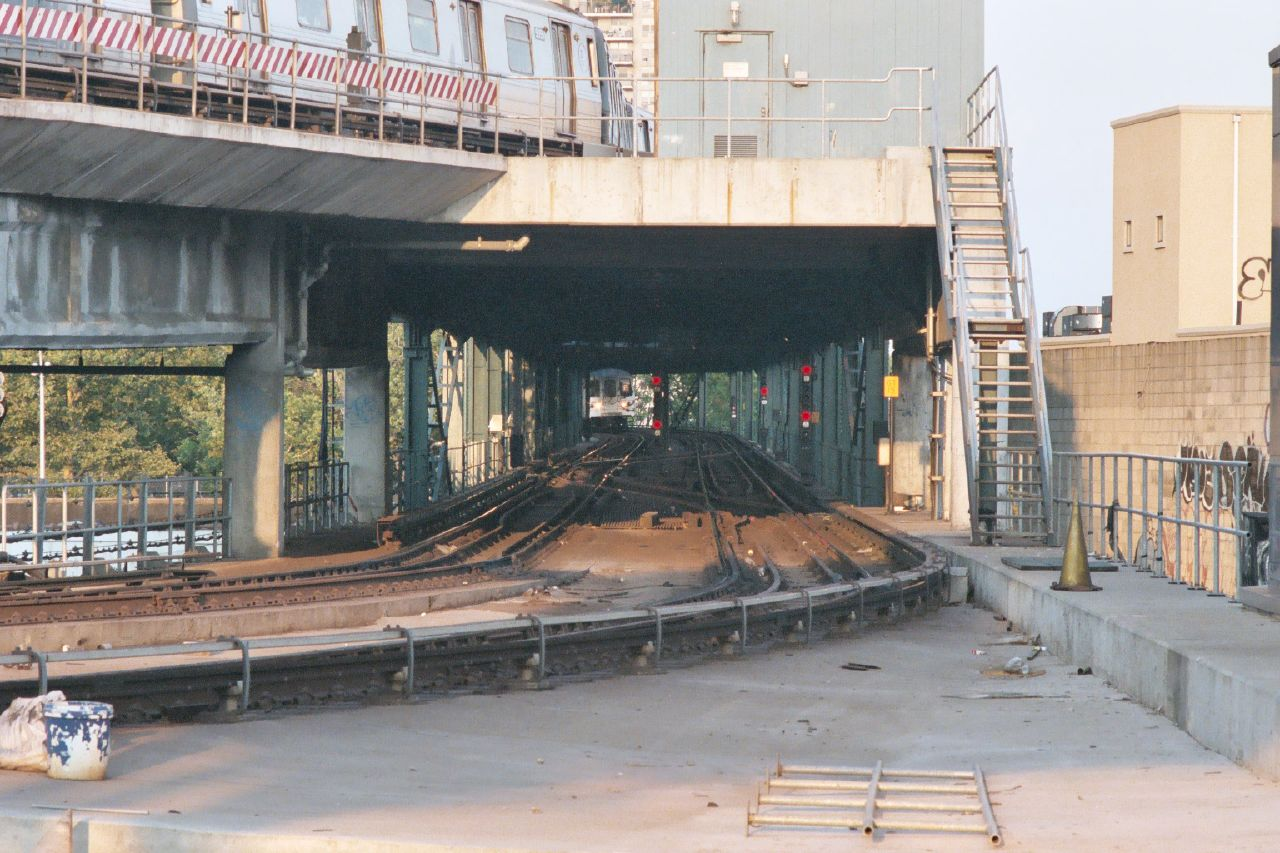
The Culver Line leaves Coney Island–Stillwell Avenue underneath the BMT Brighton Line

At Ditmas Avenue, the Culver Ramp ends and the underground line becomes elevated. This is a three-track Dual Contracts elevated on the former BMT line over McDonald (formerly Gravesend) Avenue. Just before the station, the southbound local track merges into the southbound express track, while the northbound express track becomes the El's bidirectional center express track. During the 1990s and 2000s, the center express track in this section was occasionally used for non-revenue testing. After Avenue X station, a ramp diverges to the surface for access to the Culver Yard of the Coney Island Yards complex. At this point the Culver Line narrows to a two-track structure bearing one more station–Neptune Avenue–before curving into West Eighth Street–New York Aquarium station on Coney Island.

Formally, the Culver Line ends as the track curve enters the lower level of the double-decked station along the BMT Brighton Line's right-of-way, and the chaining track designation changes from IND tracks B1 and B2 to BMT tracks A1 and A2 of the Brighton Line. However, there is no longer a connection to the Brighton Line at this point, and for all practical purposes the Culver Line continues into tracks 5 and 6 of the Coney Island–Stillwell Avenue Terminal.

== History ==
=== Early years as two separate lines ===
==== BMT Culver Line (1875–1954) ====
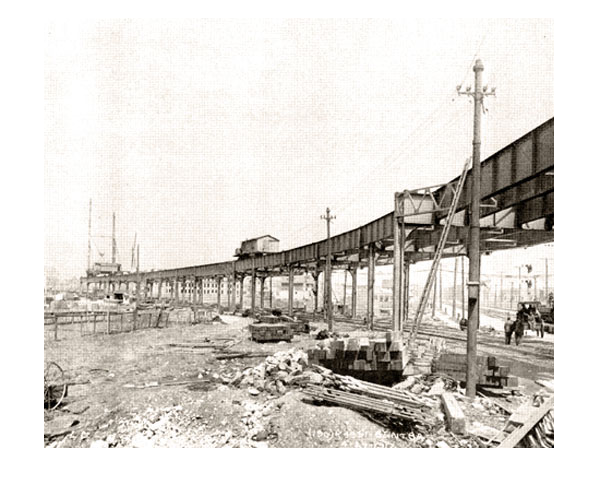
Culver Line structure being constructed in 1917

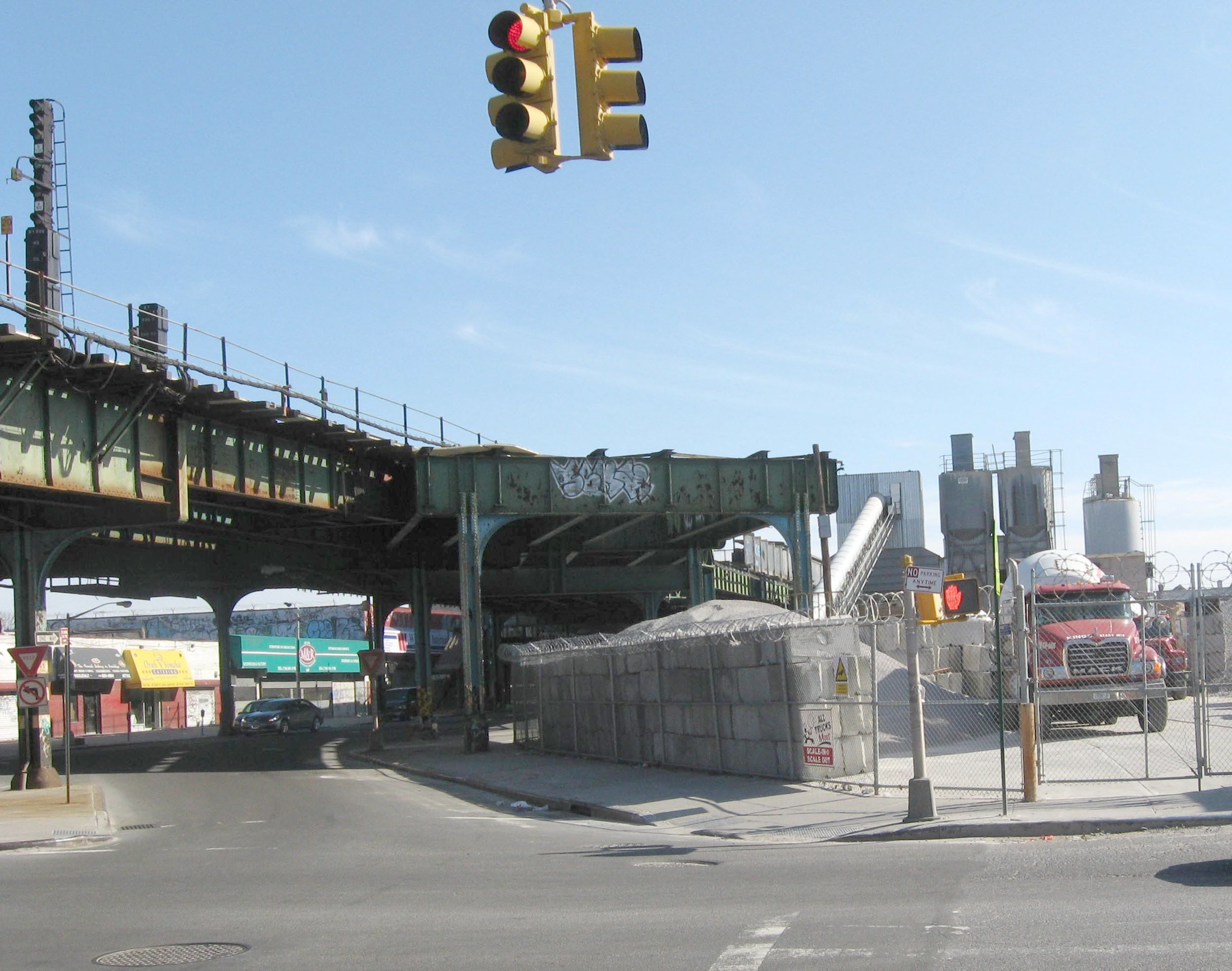
Stub of elevated line formerly running west from Cortelyou Road along 37th Street

Bilevel structure of elevated, between West 8th Street and Coney Island stations. The upper level is used by the BMT Brighton Line.

The original Culver Line was opened by the Prospect Park and Coney Island Railroad and was named after the railroad's builder, Andrew Culver. The line ran along the surface of McDonald Avenue (then Gravesend Avenue) from Greenwood Cemetery (where it connected with horse car lines including the Vanderbilt Avenue Line, operated by the PP&CI until 1886) to the Culver Depot in Coney Island, on June 25, 1875. The PP&CI began serving the Union Depot at 36th Street, where transfer could be made to the Fifth Avenue Elevated, on June 7, 1890, by using the Prospect Park and South Brooklyn Railroad from a junction at Parkville.

During a period of Long Island Rail Road control, from 1893 to 1899, a ramp at 36th Street was opened in 1895, allowing Brooklyn Elevated Railroad trains to operate over the Culver Line to Coney Island. The Brooklyn Rapid Transit Company (BRT), by then the owner of the Brooklyn Elevated, leased the Culver Line (to the Brooklyn Heights Railroad) on June 18, 1899, and began using it to take not only elevated trains but also trolleys to Coney Island.

As part of Contract 4 of the Dual Contracts, between the city and the BRT, a three-track elevated railway was built above the Culver Line. The line, formally known as Route 49, or the Gravesend Avenue Line, was to run from the Fifth Avenue Elevated at Tenth Avenue and 37th Street, above private property south of 37th Street, and then south over Gravesend Avenue to Coney Island. At Ninth Avenue, the elevated replacements for the Culver Line and West End Line met, with access from both lines to the Fifth Avenue Elevated and Fourth Avenue Subway to the northwest.

Construction of the route was done in four sections: Section 1, 1-A, 2, and 3. Section 1-A extended from a location on the west building line of Tenth Avenue between 38th Street and 37th Street to a location 372 feet (113 m) east of the building line on Tenth Avenue, running in an open cut and then a fill over Tenth Avenue. Section 1 extended from a point 372 feet (113 m) east of the building line on Tenth Avenue to, over private property and 37th Street, and Gravesend Avenue to a location 530 feet (160 m) south of the intersection of Gravesend Avenue and the southern building line of 22nd Avenue. Section 2 stretched from here along Gravesend Avenue to Avenue X, and Section 3 continued from here south along Shell Road and West 6th Street to a point near the southern line of Sheepshead Bay Road, where it would connect with the Brighton Line for access to Coney Island.

The contract to construct Section 2 was awarded to Oscar Daniels Company for $863,775 on July 10, 1915. Work was to be completed in eighteen months. On September 8, 1915, the contract to construct Section 1 was awarded to Post & McCord for $877,859. Work on the section was to be completed in fifteen months. On January 23, 1917, a contract to construct Section 1-A of the line in four months was awarded to Thomas Dwyer for $42,268.

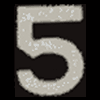
Route designation on BMT D Triplex equipment

At 3:00 a.m. on March 16, 1919, the first portion of the new elevated structure opened from Ninth Avenue southeast and south to Kings Highway. Except for the omission of a station at 15th Avenue, all of the station locations from the surface line were preserved as elevated stations. The Culver Line was operated as a branch of the Fifth Avenue Elevated, with a free transfer at Ninth Avenue to the West End Line into the Fourth Avenue Subway. An extension to Avenue X was opened at noon on May 10, 1919. The line, the last of the four to Coney Island, was completed on May 1, 1920, at which time the Brooklyn Rapid Transit Company (BRT) was forced to cut the fare from ten to five cents.

This construction tied into the existing lower level of the BMT Brighton Line east of West Eighth Street–New York Aquarium. Some Culver Line (5) trains began using the Fourth Avenue Subway to the Nassau Street Loop in Lower Manhattan when that line opened on May 30, 1931; the Fifth Avenue Elevated was closed on May 31, 1940, in conjunction with the unification of the transit system under city operations. Trolleys continued to use the surface tracks on McDonald Avenue until October 30, 1956.

==== IND Brooklyn Line (1933–1954) ====
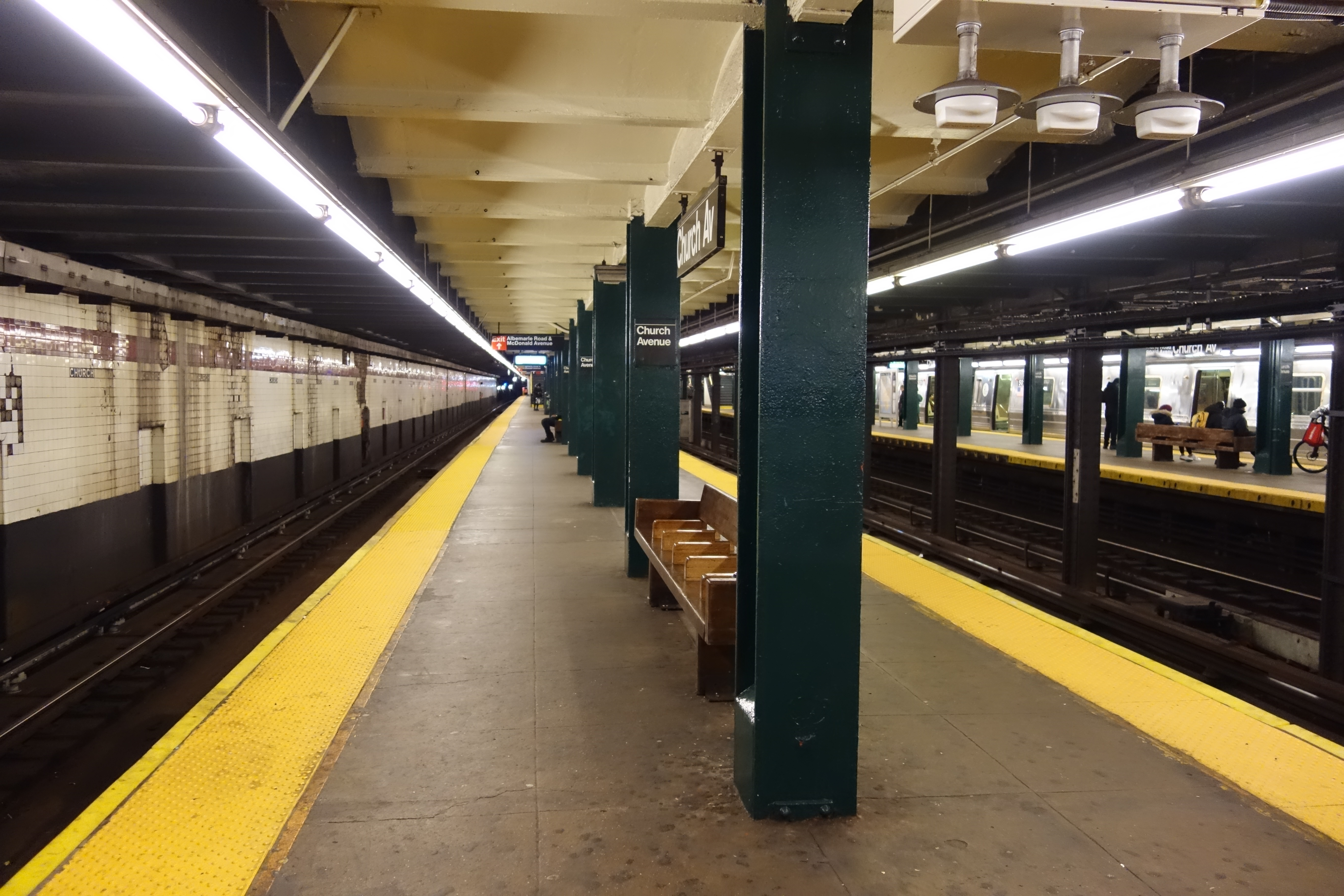
Church Avenue

One of the goals of Mayor John Hylan's Independent Subway System (IND), proposed in the 1920s was a line to Coney Island, reached by a recapture of the BMT Culver Line. To connect this line to the Eighth Avenue Line–the main trunk of the IND–a subway line was to run from Brooklyn Borough Hall south under Jay Street, Smith Street, Ninth Street, and several other streets to Cortelyou Road (later Church Avenue) and McDonald Avenue, just north of the Ditmas Avenue elevated station. A ramp would then lead onto the elevated BMT Culver Line.

This line was variously known as the Culver Line Extension, Culver−Smith Street Line, Smith Street Line, Smith Street–Prospect Park Line, Smith–Ninth Street Line, Jay–Smith–Ninth Street Line, Church Avenue Line, Prospect Park–Church Avenue Line, Prospect Park–Coney Island Line, Brooklyn Line, or South Brooklyn Line, though it was often simply referred to as the Brooklyn portion of the IND. As originally designed, service to and from Manhattan would have been exclusively provided by Culver express trains, while all local service would have fed into the IND Crosstown Line.

By 1927, it was decided to build a truss bridge over the Gowanus Canal and a viaduct over Ninth Street due to cost considerations, replacing earlier plans for a deep river tunnel. This resulted in the only above-ground section of the original IND. The first short section of the line opened on March 20, 1933, taking Eighth Avenue Express A trains (and for about a month from July to August C trains) south from Jay Street to Bergen Street. The rest of the line opened on October 7, 1933, to the "temporary" terminal at Church Avenue, three blocks away from the Culver elevated at Ditmas Avenue. In 1936, the A was rerouted to the IND Fulton Street Line and E trains from the Queens Boulevard line replaced them. On July 1, 1937, the connection to the IND Crosstown Line opened and GG trains were extended to Smith-Ninth Streets. E trains were replaced by the F on December 15, 1940, after the IND Sixth Avenue Line opened.

As part of the various proposed extensions of the IND Second System, the IND Culver subway was planned to facilitate a spur line to Bay Ridge, with a connection to the incomplete Staten Island Tunnel intended for the BMT Fourth Avenue Line. A 1931 proposal had the line travel south from Smith–Ninth Streets station through Red Hook and Gowanus to Saint George Terminal. A 1933 plan would have branched off between Smith–Ninth Streets and Fourth Avenue, then run down Second Avenue in Bay Ridge to the tunnel. Like other IND lines, this route would have been in direct competition with the then-privately operated Fourth Avenue Subway.

The final proposal from the 1939 Second System plan proposed an extension down Fort Hamilton Parkway and/or Tenth Avenue towards the tunnel, with continued service to 86th Street in Bay Ridge near the BMT Fourth Avenue Line station. This route would have diverged near the Fort Hamilton Parkway and Church Avenue stations. In 1940, proposals emerged to connect the IND with the BMT West End Line near its Fort Hamilton Parkway station; the 1946 Board of Transportation plans featured both the West End connection and the extension to 86th Street. None of these proposals were ever constructed.

=== Culver Ramp ===
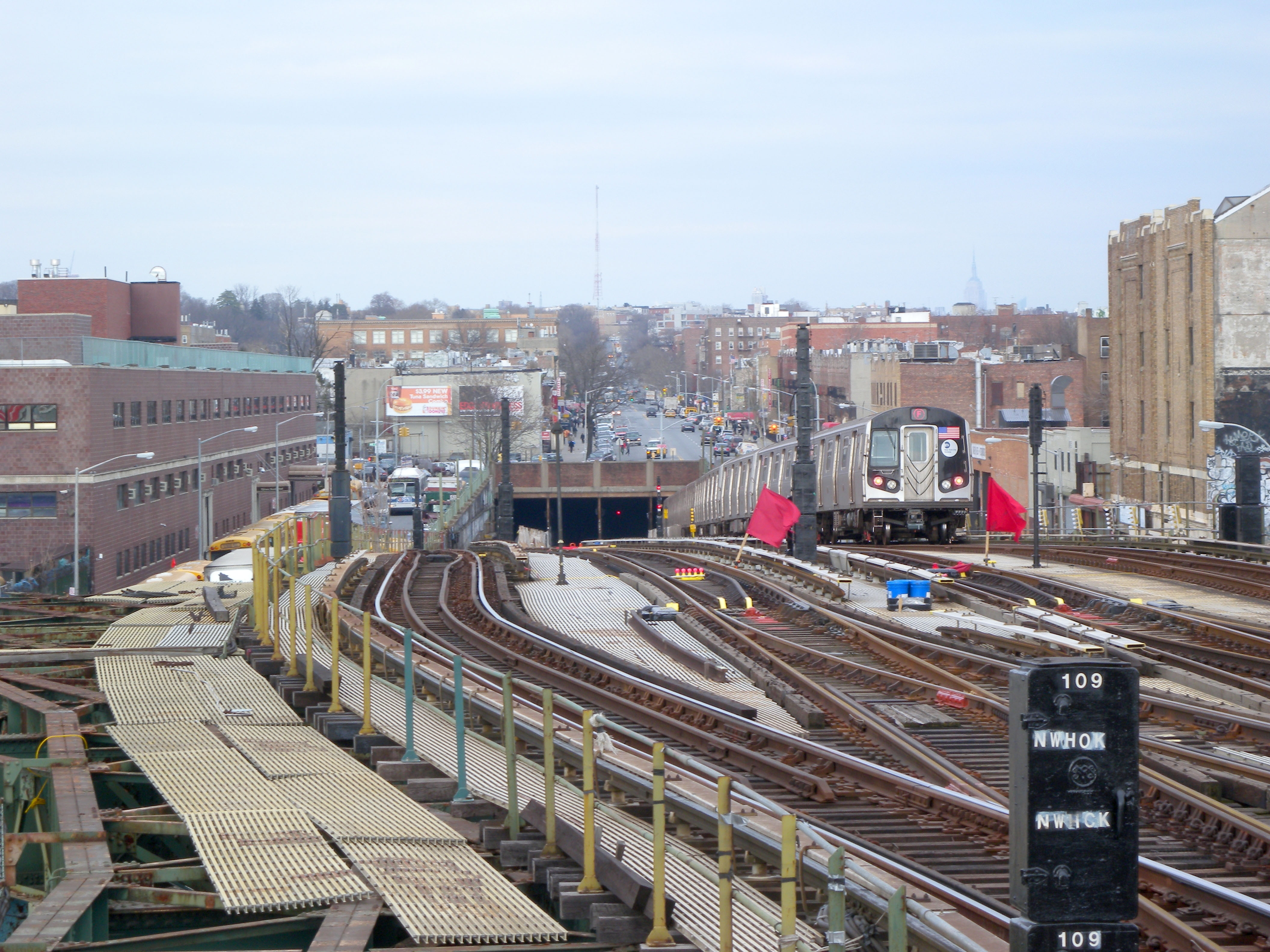
An F train traveling down the ramp. The former Culver Shuttle trackway can be seen to the left

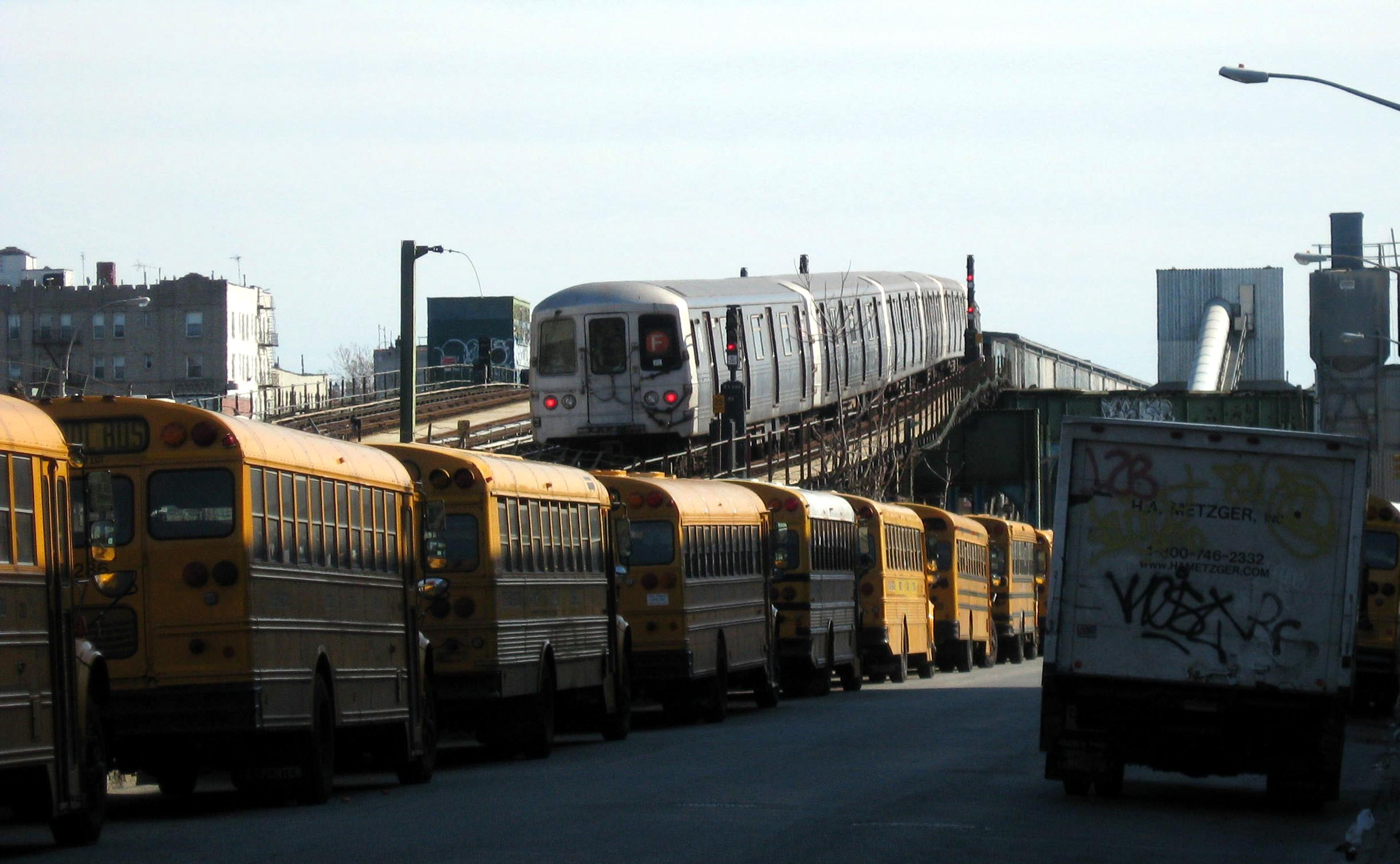
An F train climbing the ramp

Map of the BMT Culver Line (south) and the IND Brooklyn Line (north) prior to the opening of the Culver Ramp

Taking over operations, or "recapturing", the Brooklyn–Manhattan Transit Corporation (BMT) Culver Line elevated structure in order to institute IND service to Coney Island was a high priority of New York City planners. Recapture proved unnecessary since the Culver Line and the rest of the BMT and Interborough Rapid Transit Company (IRT) passed into City hands in 1940 as a result of the unification of the three companies. The new connection would create a one-fare ride for IND passengers to Coney Island, and eliminate congestion on the BMT's Fourth Avenue Subway. At the time, the IND had no direct connections to the rest of the subway system. Around 1940, a temporary ramp was installed to connect the underground IND Culver Line to the street-level South Brooklyn Railway, underneath the BMT Culver Line; this connection was used to deliver some IND rolling stock.

The proposed Culver Ramp, also referred to as the Culver Line Connection, would allow passenger service between the underground Church Avenue and elevated Ditmas Avenue stations. Construction began in June 1941, and was expected to be completed by the end of the year. The ramp was expected to cost $2 million, and along with new signals, and rehabilitation of the Culver elevated and lengthening of its stations to IND standards, the total cost of the project was estimated at over $11 million. 170 subway cars were purchased for $8.5 million for the extension of IND service. Two substations, a signal tower, a fourth track at Ditmas Avenue, and an additional stairway at Ditmas Avenue were all completed as part of the project. McDonald Avenue was also widened between Avenue C and Cortelyou Road to facilitate the ramp.

Though the ramp was nearly complete, including rails and signal work, construction was halted later that year because of America's entrance into World War II. When the project was restarted in 1946, completion was delayed further due to continued material shortages and a lack of rolling stock to facilitate the new service. On October 30, 1954, the connection between the IND Brooklyn Line at Church Avenue and the BMT Culver Line at Ditmas Avenue opened. This allowed IND trains to operate all the way to the Coney Island–Stillwell Avenue terminal.

=== IND Culver Line (1954–present) ===
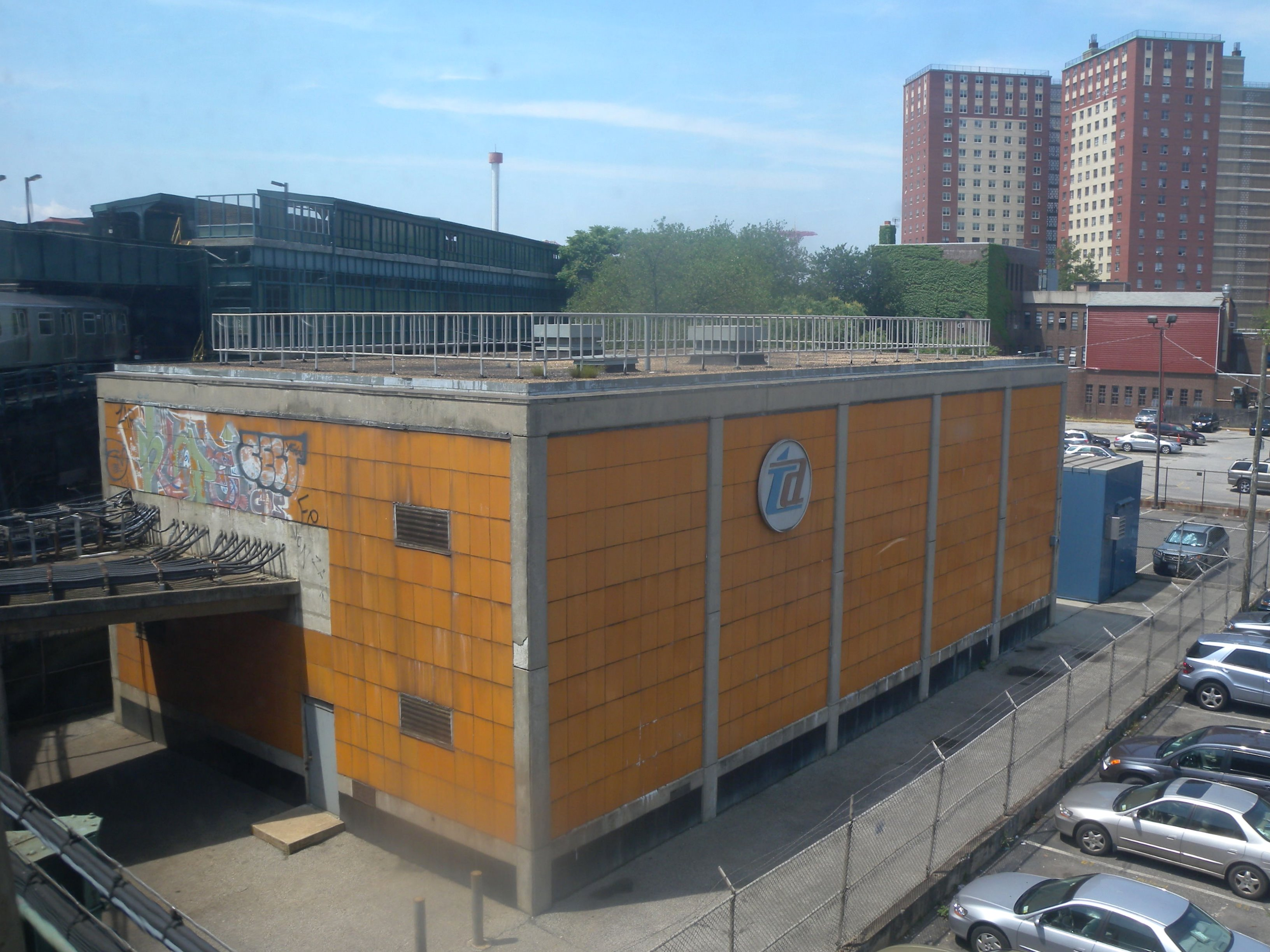
The Coney Island power substation

Following the completion of Culver Ramp, D Concourse Express trains (which formerly terminated in Manhattan) replaced F service, and were sent over the new connection as the first IND service to reach Coney Island. The service was announced as Concourse–Culver and advertised as direct Bronx–Coney Island service. BMT Culver Line (5) trains were truncated to Ditmas Avenue, the south end of the connection, operating through to Manhattan via the Nassau Street Loop during the day, and terminating at Ninth Avenue at other times. This Culver Shuttle became full-time on May 28, 1959, and was closed on May 13, 1975, replaced by a transfer to the B35 bus route. The elevated portion has been re-chained as part of the B2 (IND) division, but still uses B1 (BMT) division radio frequencies.

On November 26, 1967, the Chrystie Street Connection opened and D trains were rerouted via the Manhattan Bridge and the BMT Brighton Line to Coney Island. F trains were extended once again via the Culver Line. From June 1968 to 1987, the Culver Line featured express service during rush hours. F trains ran express in both directions between Bergen Street and Church Avenue, while G trains were extended from Smith–Ninth Streets to Church Avenue to provide local service. Express service on the elevated portion of the line to Kings Highway operated in the peak direction (to Manhattan AM; to Brooklyn PM), with some F trains running local and some running express.

Express service between Bergen and Church ended in 1976, and between Church and Kings Highway on April 27, 1987, largely due to budget constraints and complaints from passengers at local stations. Express service on the elevated Culver Line was ended due to necessary structural work, and was supposed to be restored after the $50 million project's completion in 1990, but never restored. With the end of express service, Bergen Street's lower level was taken out of service. Following renovations to the station in the 1990s, the lower level was converted into storage space and is not usable for passenger service in its current state.

In 1986, the New York City Transit Authority launched a study to determine whether to close 79 stations on 11 routes, including the segment of the Culver Line south of either Kings Highway or Avenue U, due to low ridership and high repair costs. Numerous figures, including New York City Council member Carol Greitzer, criticized the plans.

==== Rehabilitation ====
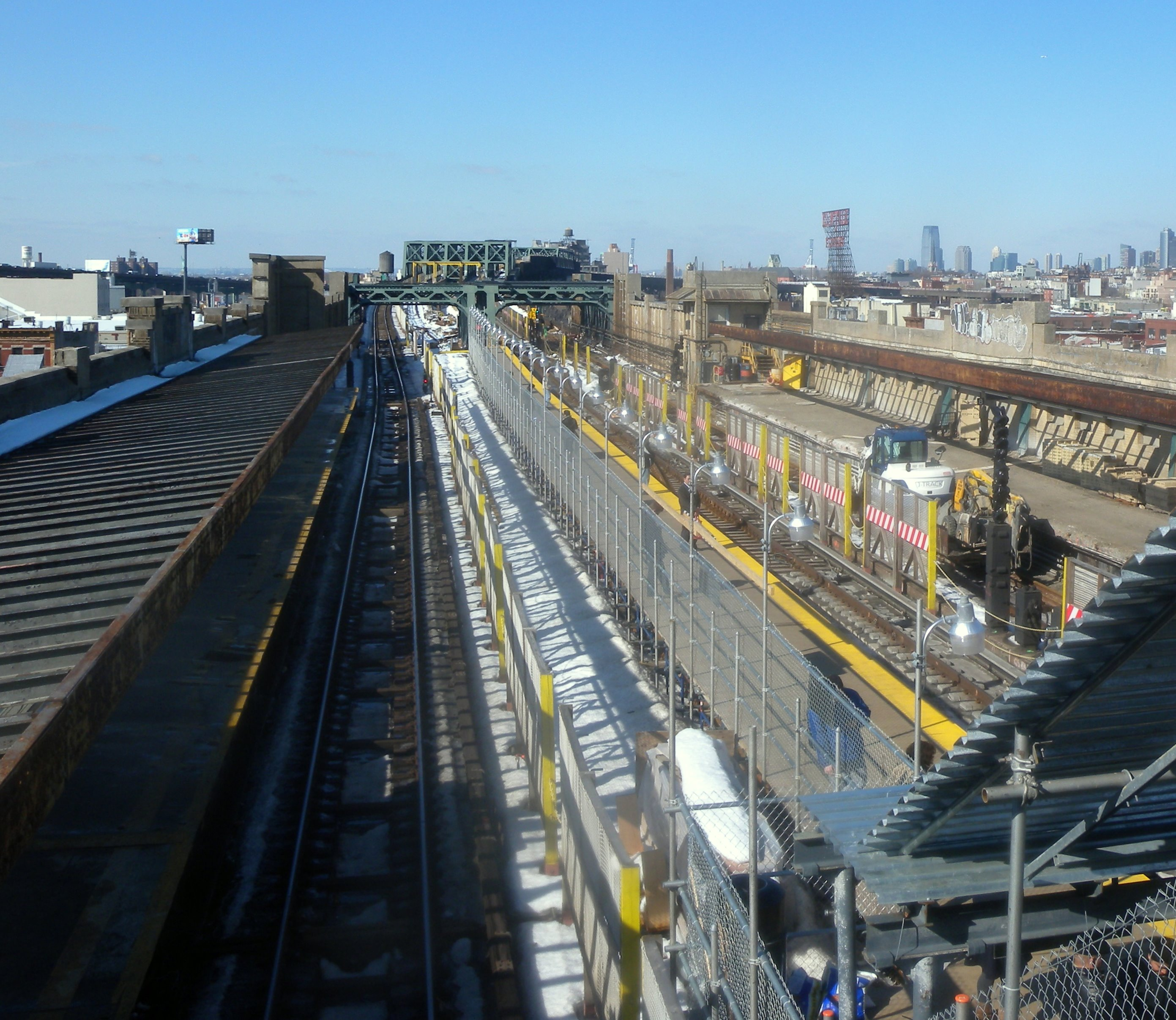
A temporary platform (center) erected at Fourth Avenue during the Culver Rehabilitation Project.

In 2007, the MTA announced that several portions of the Culver Line would be undergoing extensive rehabilitation. The first renovation involved repairs of the elevated Culver Viaduct (including the Smith–Ninth Streets and Fourth Avenue stations) and modernization of the interlockings at Bergen Street, 4th Avenue, and Church Avenue. The B5 layup track was removed as part of the project. This also allowed the G train to be extended from its longtime terminus at Smith–Ninth Streets to a more efficient terminus at Church Avenue beginning in July 2009. The project was completed in 2013.

Stations along the three-tracked stretch of the Culver Line were renovated until July 30, 2018 (excluding Ditmas Avenue and the northbound platform of Avenue X, which were rehabilitated in 2015–2016), with the center track being used to bypass closed stations. The Coney Island-bound platforms were rehabilitated between June 7, 2016, and May 1, 2017 (May 8 for Avenue U and Avenue X). During the second phase of the project, beginning on May 22, 2017, the Manhattan-bound platforms were closed between Avenue U and 18th Avenue until July 30, 2018. The interlocking at Kings Highway is scheduled to be modernized as part of the 2020–2024 MTA Capital Program, and the modernization could include the reinstallation of the necessary track switches. A switch will be added between the express track and the northbound local track south of Avenue P.

In July 2019, online newspaper The City discovered that the MTA had allocated $660,000 in its 2015–2019 Capital Program for a design study to make patches to the Culver Viaduct, whose renovation was completed in 2016. The study would determine how to fix the premature deterioration of structural braces, unsatisfactory drainage, and leaking expansion joints. Funding will be provided in a future capital program.

==== Express service ====
Around the time the Culver Viaduct rehabilitation project was announced in 2007, a petition to restore express service along the line gained attention, due to increasing ridership on both the F and G services in Brooklyn. The petition, which gained over 2,500 signatures by June 2007 and nearly 4,000 by September, proposed to restore express service by making the Church Avenue extension of the G permanent and extending the V (eliminated in 2010) from its Manhattan terminus to Brooklyn, sharing the Rutgers Street Tunnel with the F. The G extension was made permanent in July 2012, freeing up the express tracks formerly used to relay trains.

In 2015, some rush-hour peak-direction F trains started skipping local stops between Jay Street and Fourth Avenue, and the MTA used expanded rush-hour express service (from Jay Street to Church Avenue) in both directions in the summers of 2016 and 2017. In May 2016, the MTA announced that half of all rush-hour F trains may start running express in both directions in fall 2017; however, because of rolling stock and track capacity limitations, the train frequency on the rest of the F's route would remain the same. With an increase in rolling stock caused by the introduction of the R179s, one more train per hour could be run on the F. The operation of half of the F trains as express would result in operational improvements, with faster service, as southbound F trains would no longer be delayed by terminating G trains discharging at Church Avenue.

Overall, the F express will result in an overall reduction of 27,000 minutes during the AM rush hour and 13,000 minutes during the PM rush hour. The change in service will decrease service at local stations, reducing in longer wait times, but it will help riders in South Brooklyn with the longest commutes. F express trains would be slightly more crowded than current F trains, but the F locals would be less crowded. PM rush hour express service would lead to much larger exit surges from less frequent F local trains at Bergen Street and Carroll Street, leading to significant congestion at one staircase at Bergen Street, and moderate congestion at one staircase at Carroll Street. Relieving the congestion, would entail widening the staircases and installing ADA-required elevators that would cost approximately $10 million per station. The possibility of reopening the Bergen Street lower level was looked at as part of the study for the reintroduction of F express service; the reopening would require significant and expensive reconstruction, including making the station ADA accessible, the reconstruction of platform stairs, improved lighting and communications, waterproofing and concrete repairs, among other things. Since the rehabilitation would cost $75 million, the lower level was not reopened.

In July 2019, the MTA announced that it planned to run four rush-hour express F trains per day, two in each direction, starting in September 2019. The trains would run in the peak direction, toward Manhattan in the morning and toward Brooklyn in the evening. The trains would make an intermediate stop at Seventh Avenue between Jay Street–MetroTech and Church Avenue and bypass a total of six stations. This service is represented with a diamond <F>, similar to the symbol used on other peak-direction express services. Peak-direction express service between Church Avenue and Kings Highway was not restored due to limitations caused by current track configurations, as the switches at Kings Highway previously used were removed in the 1990s.

==== Automation ====
In order to test the interoperability of the communications-based train control (CBTC) systems of different suppliers, CBTC equipment was installed on the southbound express track between Fourth Avenue and Church Avenue, as part of the automation of the New York City Subway. The total cost was $99.6 million, with $15 million coming from the 2005–2009 Capital Program and $84.6 million from the 2010–2014 Capital Program. The installation was a joint venture between Siemens and Thales Group, and was used to test the track's new signaling on R143s and R160s that were already equipped with CBTC. Though the estimated completion date was scheduled for March 2015, it was completed in December 2015. The installation was expected to be permanent.

Test trains on the track were able to successfully operate using the interoperable Siemens/Thales CBTC system. That system became the standard for all future CBTC installations on New York City Transit tracks as of 2015. A third supplier, Mitsubishi Electric Power Products Inc., was given permission to demonstrate that its technology could be interoperable with the Siemens/Thales technology. The $1.2 million Mitsubishi contract was approved in July 2015. If Culver Line express service was implemented in 2017 as it was proposed, the express service would not initially have used CBTC, and testing of CBTC on the express track would be limited to off-peak hours.

In 2017, the MTA started testing ultra-wideband radio-enabled train signaling on the IND Culver Line. The ultra-wideband train signals would be able to transmit more data wirelessly in a manner similar to CBTC, but can be installed faster than CBTC systems. The ultra-wideband signals would have the added benefit of allowing passengers to use cellphones while between stations, instead of the current setup where passengers could only get cellphone signals within the stations themselves.

As part of the MTA's 2015–2019 Capital Program, CBTC is being installed on the section of the line between Church Avenue and West Eighth Street–New York Aquarium, replacing 70-year old signals. The contract for the installation of CBTC and the modernization of the Ditmas Avenue and Avenue X interlockings, was awarded in February 2019 to Tutor Perini for $253 million. Substantial completion of the project was expected in August 2022. As part of the project, switches north of Ditmas Avenue will be removed, and will be replaced by two new interlockings directly south of Church Avenue and a new interlocking north of 18th Avenue.

Avenue X interlocking will be reconfigured. As of February 2020, 80% of wayside signaling equipment had been installed, a relay room was completed, steel and concrete floors at the Ditmas Avenue signal facility were installed, all signal cables were installed, and piling and grade beam installation at the Avenue X signal facility were completed. To allow the CBTC project to enter its next phase, F service was suspended south of Church Avenue during most weekends starting in early 2020. Work to install CBTC continued into 2021.

In December 2022, the MTA announced that it would award a $368 million design–build contract to Crosstown Partners, a joint venture between Thales Group and TC Electric LLC, to install CBTC along the length of the G route. The contract includes not only the Crosstown Line between Court Square and Bergen Street, but also the Culver Line between Bergen Street and Church Avenue. Upon the completion of the contract, the entire G route and much of the F route would be CBTC-equipped.

== Station listing ==
Station service legend
Stops all times	Stops 24 hours a day
Stops all times except late nights	Stops every day during daytime hours only
Stops late nights only	Stops every day during overnight hours only
Stops rush hours only	Stops during weekday rush hours only
Stops rush hours in the peak direction only	Stops during weekday rush hours in the peak direction only
Time period details
Disabled access	Station is compliant with the Americans with Disabilities Act
↑	Station is compliant with the Americans with Disabilities Act in the indicated direction only
↓	Station is compliant with the Americans with Disabilities Act in the indicated direction only
	Elevator access to mezzanine only

Neighborhood (approximate)	Disabled access	Station	Tracks	Services	Opened	Transfers and notes
begins as continuation of the IND Sixth Avenue Line local tracks (F <F>)
Downtown Brooklyn	Disabled access	Jay Street–MetroTech	all	F <F>	February 1, 1933	IND Fulton Street Line (A C ) BMT Fourth Avenue Line (N R W )
Express Tracks begin (<F> )
Merge from the IND Crosstown Line (G ) into local tracks
Cobble Hill		Bergen Street	all	F G	March 20, 1933	upper level: Local (in service) lower level: Express (no regular service)
Carroll Gardens		Carroll Street	local	F G	October 7, 1933	
Gowanus		Smith–Ninth Streets	local	F G	October 7, 1933	
Gowanus		Fourth Avenue	local	F G	October 7, 1933	BMT Fourth Avenue Line (D N R W ) at Ninth Street
Park Slope	Disabled access	Seventh Avenue	all	F <F> G	October 7, 1933	
express tracks diverge (<F> )
Windsor Terrace		15th Street–Prospect Park	local	F G	October 7, 1933	
Windsor Terrace	express tracks rejoin on lower level (<F> )					
Windsor Terrace		Fort Hamilton Parkway	local	F G	October 7, 1933	
express tracks rise (no regular service)
Kensington	Disabled access	Church Avenue	all	F <F> G	October 7, 1933	southern terminal of G train
Connecting tracks to Church Avenue Yard
Former stations on BMT Culver Line, to the west of the IND merge north of Ditmas Avenue
Sunset Park		Ninth Avenue	all	Culver Shuttle	March 16, 1919	Stopped on lower level, which closed on May 11, 1975. Transfer was available to the BMT West End Line.
Borough Park		Fort Hamilton Parkway	local	Culver Shuttle	March 16, 1919	Closed on May 11, 1975, and demolished in 1985.
Borough Park		13th Avenue	local	Culver Shuttle	March 16, 1919	Closed on May 11, 1975, and demolished in 1985.
Southbound express track merges into southbound local track and bi-directional express track creating a 3 track line (formerly the BMT Culver Line)
Kensington/ Borough Park		Ditmas Avenue	local	F <F>	March 16, 1919	Former terminal for the Culver Shuttle, side platform closed on May 11, 1975.
Kensington/ Borough Park		18th Avenue	all	F <F>	March 16, 1919	
Midwood		Avenue I	local	F <F>	March 16, 1919	
Midwood		Bay Parkway	local	F <F>	March 16, 1919	
Midwood		Avenue N	local	F <F>	March 16, 1919	
Gravesend		Avenue P	local	F <F>	March 16, 1919	
Gravesend	Disabled access	Kings Highway	all	F <F>	March 16, 1919	B82 Select Bus Service southern terminal of several F trains during rush hours
Gravesend		Avenue U	local	F <F>	May 10, 1919	
Gravesend		Avenue X	local	F <F>	May 10, 1919	
Express track ends merging into southbound local track and continuing into Coney Island Yard
Coney Island		Neptune Avenue	all	F <F>	May 1, 1920	
Coney Island		West Eighth Street–New York Aquarium	all	F <F>	May 1, 1920	BMT Brighton Line (Q )
Coney Island	Disabled access	Coney Island–Stillwell Avenue	all	F <F>	May 1, 1920	BMT Brighton Line (Q ) BMT Sea Beach Line (N ) BMT West End Line (D )
