= Neptune Avenue station =

New York City Subway station in Brooklyn

Neptune Avenue
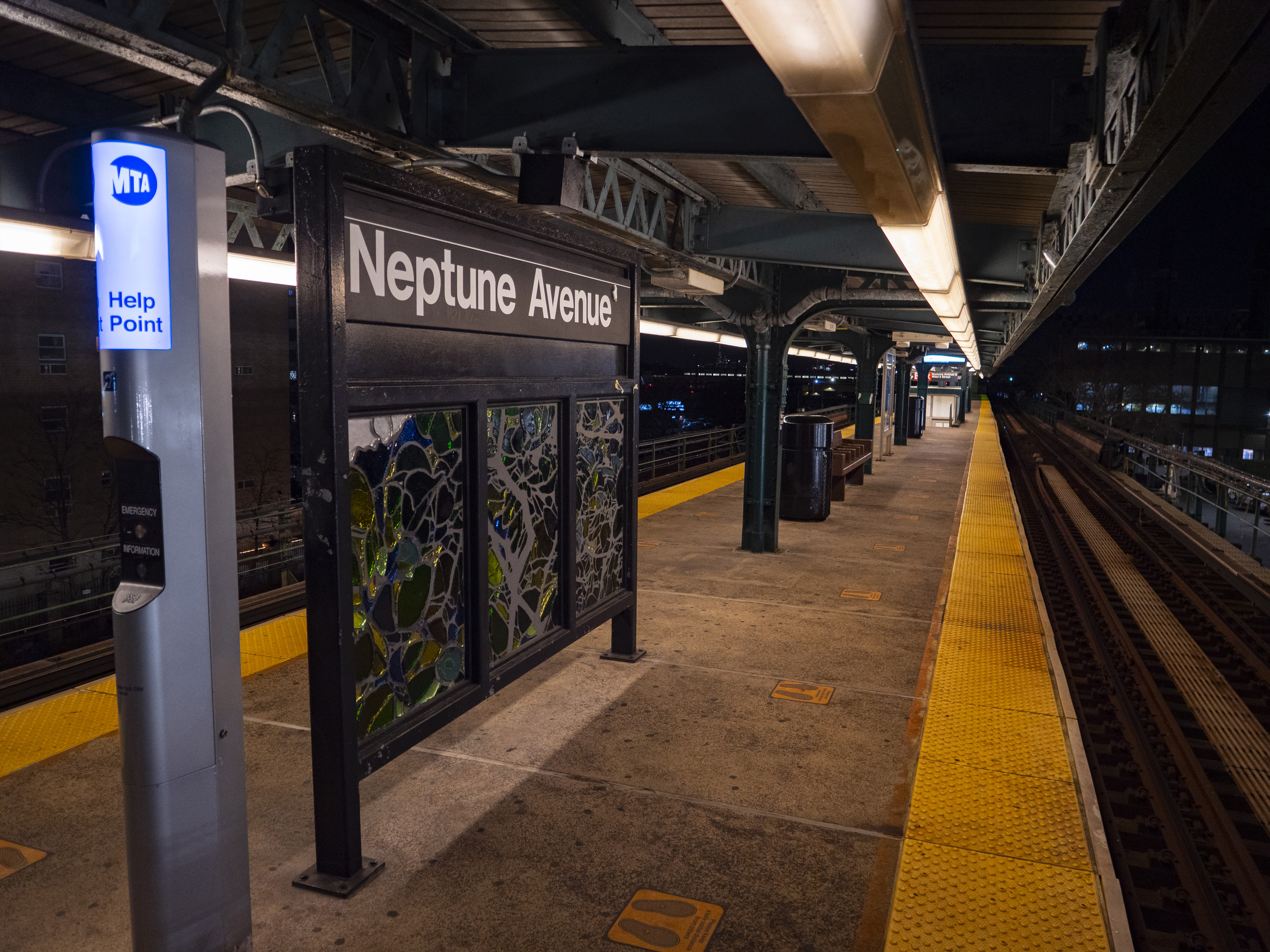

Station statistics
- Address: Neptune Avenue & West Sixth Street; Brooklyn, New York
- Borough: Brooklyn
- Locale: Coney Island
- Coordinates: 40°34′49.43″N 73°58′28.44″W
- Division: B (IND, formerly BMT)
- Line: IND Culver Line; BMT Culver Line (formerly)
- Services: F (all times) <F> (two rush hour trains, peak direction)
- Transit: NYCT Bus: B68
- Structure: Elevated
- Platforms: 1 island platform
- Tracks: 2

Other information
- Opened: May 1, 1920; 106 years ago
- Accessible: No; planned
- Former/other names: Van Sicklen

Traffic
- 2025: 333,540 ▲4.9%
- Rank: 410 out of 423
Services
Preceding station	New York City Subway	Following station
Avenue X F <F> toward Jamaica–179th Street	Local	West Eighth Street–New York Aquarium F <F> toward Coney Island–Stillwell Avenue
Location
Location within New York City Subway
Location within New York City
Location within New York
Track layout
Street map
Station service legend
Symbol	Description
Stops all times	Stops all times
Stops rush hours in the peak direction only (limited service)	Stops rush hours in the peak direction only (limited service)
Stops weekdays and weekday late nights	Stops weekdays and weekday late nights

The Neptune Avenue station is a local station on the IND Culver Line of the New York City Subway, located in Coney Island, Brooklyn, at the intersection of Neptune Avenue and West 6th Street. It is served by the F train at all times and the <F> train during rush hours in the peak direction.

== History ==
This station opened on May 1, 1920, as part of an extension of the BMT Culver Line from Avenue X to Coney Island–Stillwell Avenue, completing the line. This was the last of the four lines to Coney Island, and upon its opening the Brooklyn Rapid Transit Company (BRT) was forced to cut the fare to Coney Island from ten to five cents.

In 2002, it was announced that Neptune Avenue would be one of ten subway stations citywide to receive renovations. The station was closed on September 8, 2002, in conjunction with the reconstruction of the Coney Island–Stillwell Avenue terminal, and service was restored on May 23, 2004. The renovation would take place during the temporary closure.

In 2019, the MTA announced that this station would become ADA-accessible as part of the agency's 2020–2024 Capital Program. The project was to be funded by congestion pricing in New York City, but it was postponed in June 2024 after the implementation of congestion pricing was delayed. However, after congestion pricing was approved, the MTA announced that the elevator installations would proceed. In July 2026, the MTA announced plans for accessibility renovations at five subway stations in Brooklyn. Among these, the Neptune Avenue station would receive one elevator.

On January 10, 2024, a northbound F train derailed at the Neptune Avenue station.

== Station layout ==
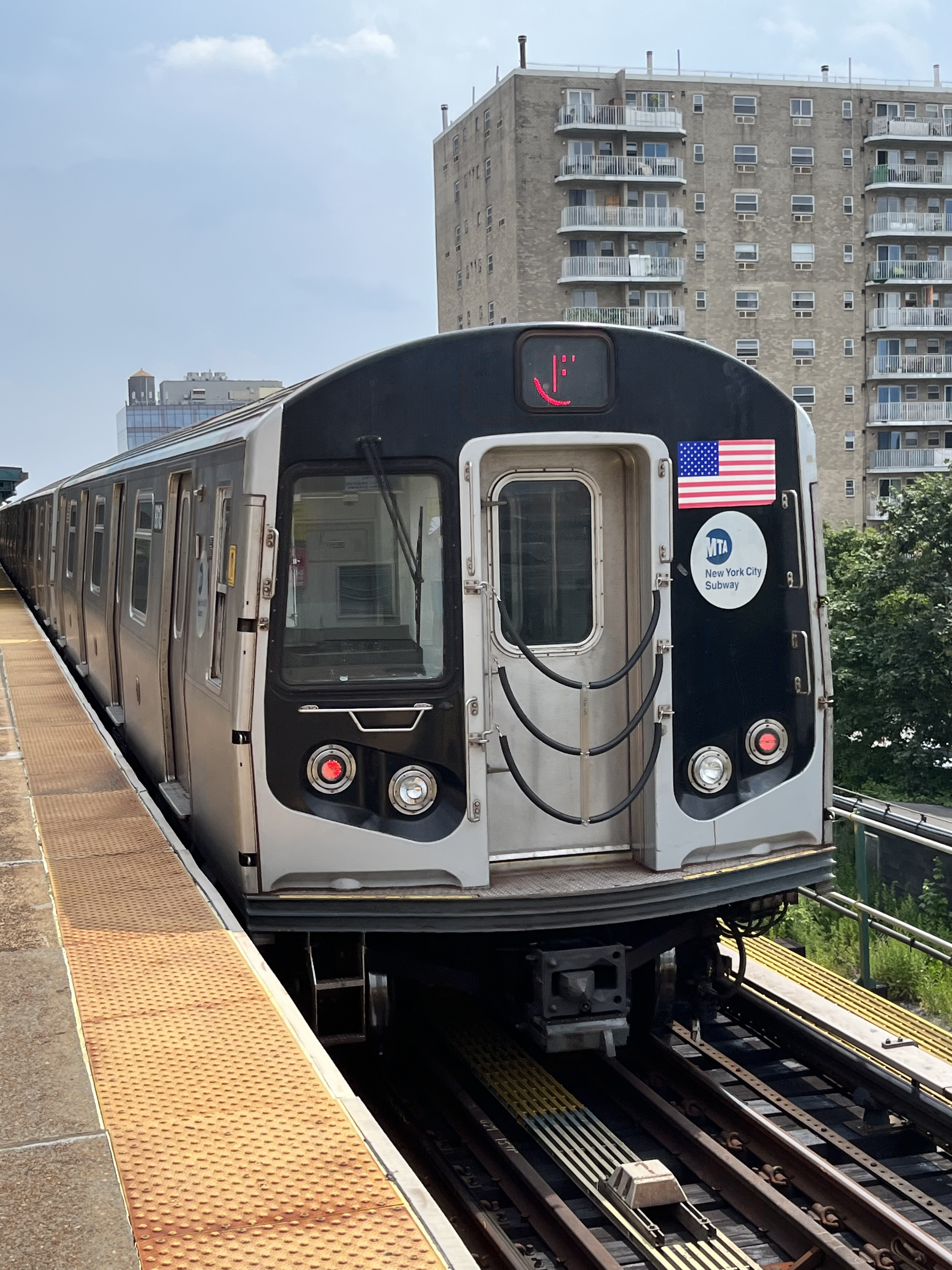
Coney Island bound F train at the station

This elevated station has one island platform and two tracks. The platform has a brown canopy with green frames and support columns in the center and black lampposts at either end. The station signs are in the standard black plates with white lettering.

The 2004 artwork here is called Looking Up by Michael Krondl. It features stained glass panels on four of the station's sign structures depicting images related to Coney Island, including the Coney Island Cyclone.

The original name of this station was Van Sicklen, named for the family that owned the property through which the original surface right-of-way passed, and that operated the Van Sicklen Hotel at the location. The name was changed to Neptune Avenue in 1995.

=== Exits ===
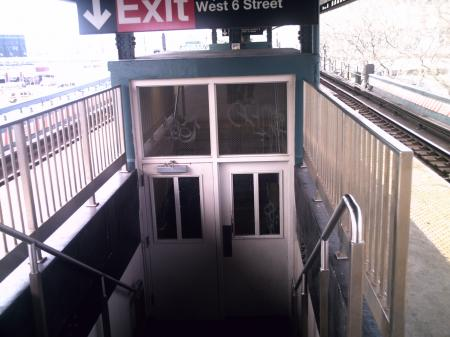
Entrance to mezzanine from platform

This station has one elevated station-house beneath the center of the platform and tracks. Two staircases from the platform go down to a landing, where a set of doors for each one leads to two more staircases that go down to the mezzanine. The mezzanine has a turnstile bank, exit-only turnstile, token booth, and two staircases going down to either side of West Sixth Street north of Neptune Avenue.
