= Culver Line (surface) =

Public transit line in Brooklyn, New York

The Culver Line, Gravesend Avenue Line, or McDonald Avenue Line was a surface public transit line in Brooklyn, New York City, United States, running along McDonald Avenue and built by the Prospect Park and Coney Island Railroad. Most of its main line has been essentially replaced by the IND Culver Line of the New York City Subway.

The company originally owned a streetcar line - the Vanderbilt Avenue Line - from Prospect Park north to downtown Brooklyn.

== History ==
The original surface steam railroad opened in 1875 from Greenwood Depot on the eastern side of Green-wood Cemetery at current Prospect Park West (9th Avenue) and 20th Street in the then-City of Brooklyn where transfer could be made to horse-drawn streetcars to downtown Brooklyn. As the Culver Line was built on a nearly straight path from terminal to terminal, it was a popular choice for travelers to the Atlantic Ocean shore at Coney Island. Service to Neck Road opened June 19, and Coney Island June 27. In 1880 service began on the line to Union Station at 5th Avenue and 36th Street.

On January 6, 1886, it was reported by the Prospect Park and Coney Island Railroad that the fare on the Culver line was set at 25 cents for adults; 15 cents for children between five and 12 years; and free for children under five.

=== LIRR ownership ===
The Culver Line was owned by the Long Island Rail Road from 1895 to 1899 and for a time both before (by interline agreements) and throughout that period, used the Culver Line in whole or in part for a variety of services in combination with its New York and Manhattan Beach Railway lines to provide services variously connecting downtown Brooklyn via the Fifth Avenue Elevated, the 39th Street Ferry and the 65th Street Ferry on the one hand, and the Sheepshead Bay Race Track, West Brighton and Manhattan Beach, the latter two on Coney Island, on the other hand.

The Culver Line built a connection to the South Brooklyn Railway, which had built a line to gain access to ferry connections at 39th Street and the waterfront. When this branch, parallel to Brooklyn 37th Street, was electrified with trolley wire elevated trains from the Fifth Avenue Line were able to use the Culver Line to reach Coney Island directly from Park Row in Lower Manhattan to Coney Island. Under the Brooklyn Rapid Transit Company, the Culver became the primary service on the Fifth Avenue El.

In 1891, the Coney Island and Brooklyn Railroad electrified its Coney Island Avenue Streetcar Line and breached its agreement to run its cars to the Culver's Greenwood Cemetery terminal in favor of connecting its own Smith Street Streetcar Line to its former horsecar line. In retaliation, the Culver Line, after electrifying its own line, interoperated with the Nassau Electric Railroad's Vanderbilt Avenue Streetcar Line to downtown Brooklyn and lower Manhattan via the Brooklyn Bridge.

From this start, the Culver Line became a major trolley route in addition to its excursion and elevated railway traffic, accepting connections from a variety of other streetcar lines. After the ca. 1900 consolidation of most streetcar lines in Brooklyn under the Brooklyn Rapid Transit Company, many summer services were operated from other lines onto the Culver to Coney Island. These included:

- Court Street Line, Park Row in Lower Manhattan to Coney Island
- Fifteenth Street Line, Hamilton Ferry in Red Hook, Brooklyn to Coney Island
- Myrtle-Culver Line, Ridgewood, Queens to Coney Island
- Nostrand-Culver Line, Essex Street in Lower East Side, Manhattan to Coney Island
- Reid Avenue Line, Essex Street to Coney Island
- Tompkins-Culver Line, Greenpoint Ferry in Greenpoint, Brooklyn to Coney Island
- Union Street Line, Park Row to Coney Island
- Vanderbilt Avenue Line, Park Row to Coney Island

Streetcar operations on the surface Culver Line continued to the very end of Brooklyn streetcar operations on October 30, 1956. The final services were the McDonald Avenue Streetcar Line (formerly known as Gravesend Avenue Line) and the 16th Avenue Branch of the Church Avenue Streetcar (formerly known as Gravesend–Church). The McDonald Avenue Line traced the entire route of the original Culver Line, except at its very southern end, where it rather ironically ended at the West 5th Street Depot of its former rival, the Coney Island and Brooklyn Railroad.
