= Andrew Culver (railroad executive) =

Andrew R. Culver (1832–1906, aged 74) was the president of the Prospect Park and Coney Island Railroad. The line came to be known as the "Culver Route" or "Culver Line", and the name is still in use: the elevated line that replaced it, and the newer subway line that connects to it are today called the Culver Line.
