= B67 and B69 buses =

Bus routes in Brooklyn, New York

b67, b69
- Seventh Avenue Line; Vanderbilt Avenue Line
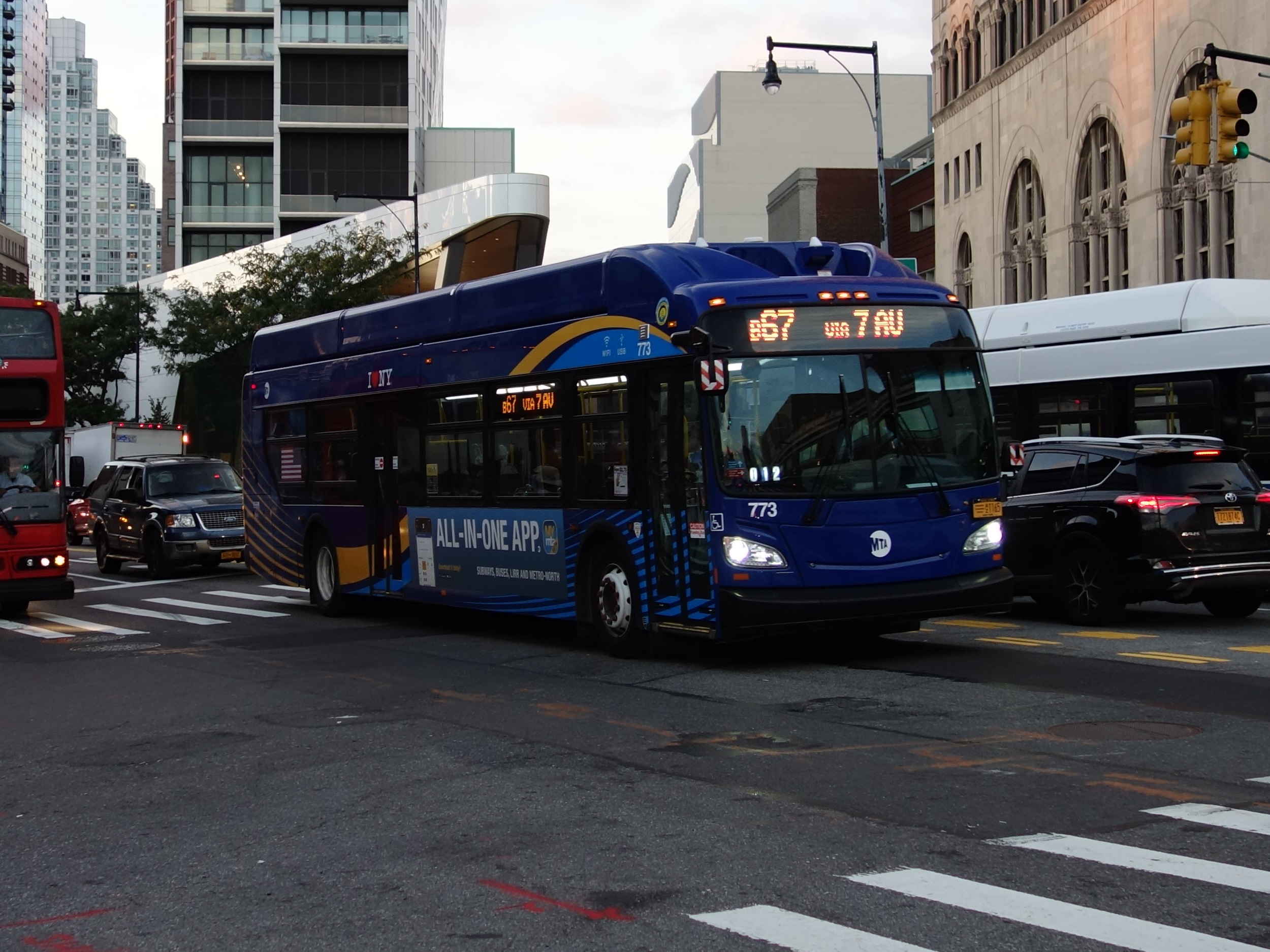
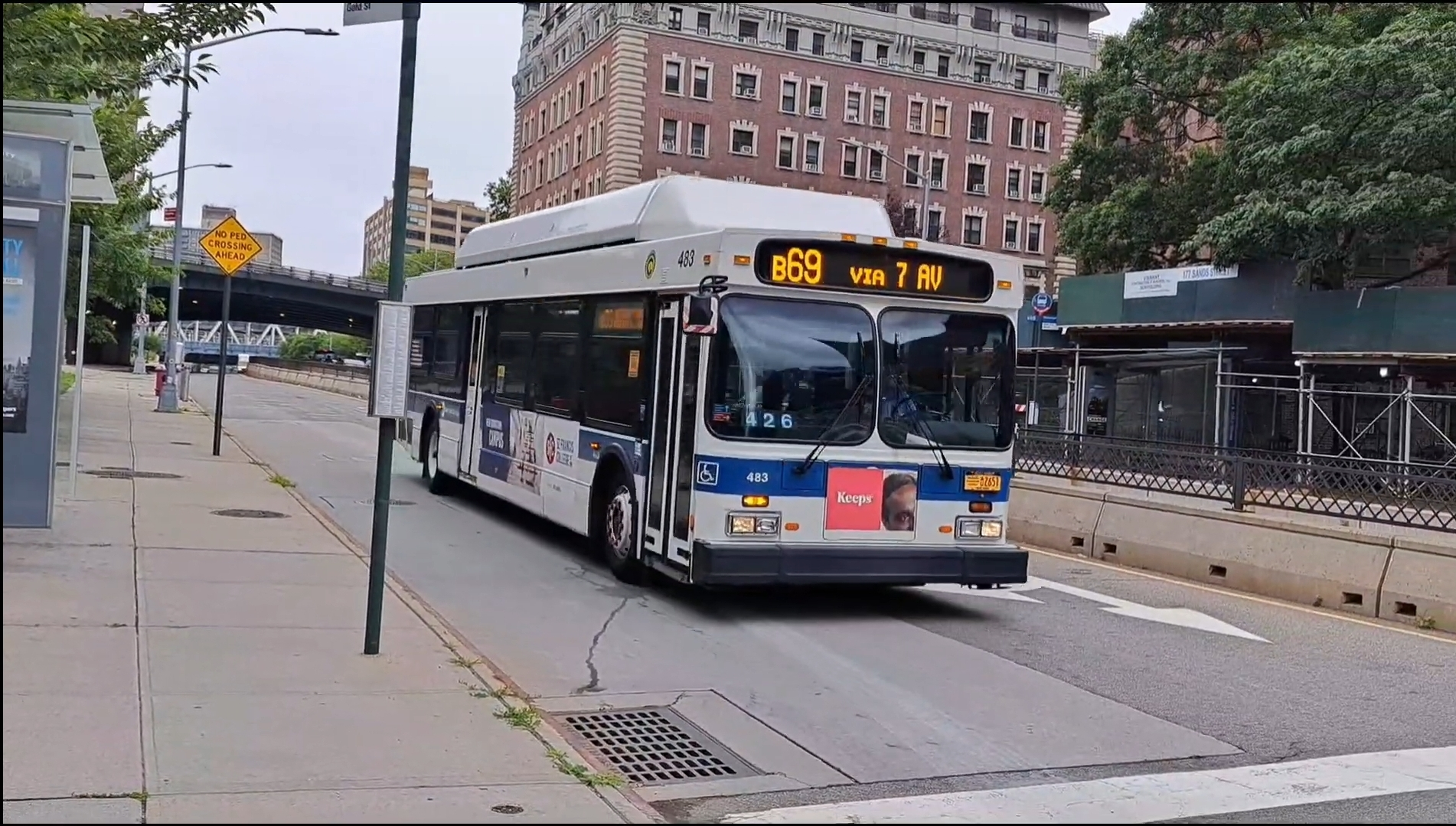
- A 2017 XN40 (773) on the Kensington-bound B67 at Atlantic Terminal (Flatbush/4th Avenues) in October 2018, and a 2011 C40LF (483) on the Kensington-bound B69 at Sand/Gold Streets

Overview
- System: MTA Regional Bus Operations
- Operator: New York City Transit Authority
- Garage: Jackie Gleason Depot
- Vehicle: New Flyer C40LF CNG; New Flyer Xcelsior XN40
- Ended service: August 19, 1950 (Vanderbilt Avenue Trolley); February 11, 1951 (Seventh Avenue Trolley)

Route
- Locale: Brooklyn, New York, U.S.
- Start: Kensington – Cortelyou Road and McDonald Avenue
- Via: All trips: McDonald Avenue, 7th Avenue; B67 trips: Flatbush Avenue, Jay Street; South Williamsburg B67 trips: via Brooklyn Navy Yard; B69 trips: Vanderbilt Avenue
- End: Downtown Brooklyn – Jay Street and Sands Street / York Street station (B67 late evenings & weekends & B69); South Williamsburg – Division Avenue and Wythe Avenue (weekdays)
- Length: 5.1 miles (8.2 km) (B67 short turn); 7 miles (11 km) (B67 full route); 6.4 miles (10.3 km) (B69)

Service
- Operates: All times except late nights
- Annual patronage: 1,002,272 (B67, 2025); 909,400 (B69, 2025)
- Transfers: Yes
- Timetable: B67/B69

The B67 and B69 bus routes comprise a public transit line in Brooklyn, New York City. Both bus routes originated as streetcar lines: The B67 originated as the Seventh Avenue Line, while the B69 originated as the Vanderbilt Avenue Line. The current bus routes are operated by MTA Regional Bus Operations. The B67 runs primarily along Seventh Avenue, Flatbush Avenue, and Livingston Street, while the B69 runs along Seventh Avenue and Vanderbilt Avenue. Although both routes' southern termini are in Kensington, Brooklyn, the northern terminus of the B67 is in Williamsburg while the northern terminus of the B69 is in Dumbo.

== Route description and service ==
=== B67 route ===
The B67 route starts at McDonald Avenue and Cortelyou Road in Kensington, near the Ditmas Avenue station (F and <F> trains) on the New York City Subway's IND Culver Line. This terminus is shared with the B69. The two routes then continue up McDonald Avenue passing the Church Avenue station (F and G trains), and connecting with the B35. North of Albemarle Road, the Culver Line turns away from McDonald Avenue and runs to 20th Street, where it runs northwest on 20th Street to 7th Avenue. Here, buses run up the corridor, serving a commercial street in Park Slope. At Ninth Street there is a transfer to the Culver Line's Seventh Avenue station (F and G trains). Both routes continue up Seventh Avenue until Seventh Avenue meets Flatbush Avenue, at the Seventh Avenue station on the BMT Brighton Line. At this location, the B69 turns south towards Grand Army Plaza, while the B67 continues up Flatbush Avenue with the B41. The line then heads into Downtown Brooklyn, interchanging with the B45 at the Atlantic Avenue–Barclays Center station (2, 3, 4, 5, B, D, N, Q, R and W trains) by the Atlantic Terminal mall and adjacent LIRR station.

All routes then head past the Barclays Center, making no stops, until it reaches Livingston Street where buses turn onto Livingston to head into Downtown Brooklyn. The B67 diverges from the B41 and B45 at Jay Street and serves the Jay Street–MetroTech station (A, C, F, <F>, N, R, and W trains). This stop is shared by the B57 and B62 buses, which split off from Jay Street at Tillary Street. The B67 then continues along Jay Street, paralleling the IND Sixth Avenue Line (F and <F> trains) to the York Street station, where it enters Dumbo. Once in Dumbo, B67 buses meander through several streets until it turns south onto Gold Street and then east onto Sands Street. The line then continues via Sands Street until it reaches the Brooklyn Navy Yard, where buses enter through its Sands Street gate. Once in the yard, buses also travel via several streets, making two stops until it exits the yard at Clymer Street and Kent Avenue in Williamsburg, where it runs north to its terminus at Division Street and Wythe Avenue.

On weekdays, buses travel the full route from Kensington to Williamsburg, via the Brooklyn Navy Yard to serve Dumbo and Vinegar Hill. On weekends, the northern terminal of the line is at Jay Street and Sands Street, and does not continue into Williamsburg. There is no overnight service.

When school is in session, four buses originate at 18th Street between 2:42-2:47pm, outside P.S. K053. All four head south to Cortelyou Road.

=== B69 route ===
The B69 bus route starts at McDonald Avenue and Cortelyou Road in Kensington. This terminus is shared with the B67. Then the two routes proceed up McDonald Avenue to 20th Street. Here, buses use 19th Street going north and 20th Street going south until 7th Avenue, where the two routes turn along 7th Avenue. From there, the lines run along that corridor, serving businesses and connecting to multiple bus and subway lines until Flatbush Avenue, where the B67 heads north on Flatbush Avenue. The B69, meanwhile, heads south on Flatbush, and goes around Grand Army Plaza to head back north on Vanderbilt Avenue. Once there, buses run up the length of the street until it meets Flushing Avenue, and it runs west on Flushing Avenue. This segment is shared with the B57. At Navy Street, the B69 turns onto Sands Street and runs along the street until its terminus at Pearl Street, just south of the York Street station.

When school is in session, two buses originate at Park Avenue near the Benjamin Banneker Academy at 2:42pm & 2:45pm, respectively. The first bus departs just outside the school on Clinton Avenue and heads to Vanderbilt via Park Avenue. Both trips head south to Cortelyou Road.

== History ==
=== Horsecar and streetcar lines ===
The line along Vanderbilt Avenue from Myrtle Avenue south to Prospect Park was built in 1869 by the Brooklyn, Hunter's Point and Prospect Park Railroad as a branch of the Crosstown Line, connecting Williamsburg to the park. The branch was not profitable, and was bought (south of Park Avenue) by the Park Avenue Railroad, which then turned it into a line to the Fulton Ferry, which opened on May 3, 1871. The line was extended south on Prospect Park West to Greenwood Cemetery with the tracks between 9th Street and 15th Street belonging to the Coney Island and Brooklyn Railroad. Andrew Culver, whom the IND Culver Line south to Coney Island is named for, was president of the company by 1872.

The Park Avenue Railroad merged with the Greenwood and Coney Island Railroad on October 9, 1874 to form the Prospect Park and Coney Island Railroad (PP&CI). In June 1883, soon after the Brooklyn Bridge opened, the PP&CI rerouted the line as an effort to make more profit. Tracks were built on Concord Street from Bridge Street west to Washington Street, and the PP&CI used the newer alignment of the DeKalb Avenue Line on Washington Street past the bridge to Front Street and Water Street and the older alignment via Gold Street and Bridge Street, which had been used primarily by the PP&CI, was abandoned.

Following an agreement made on December 10, 1885, President William Richardson of the Atlantic Avenue Railroad perpetually leased the Vanderbilt Avenue Line on January 1, 1886 for $21,000 a year, with the right to take ownership of the line on January 1, 1895 for $420,000. This lease included the entire horsecar property of the PP&CI, which kept its steam railroad from the Ninth Avenue Depot adjacent to the Greenwood Cemetery south to Coney Island. It also included franchises to build and operate the old route via Gold Street and Bridge Street, as well as the proposed 15th Street Line from Hamilton Ferry to the depot, the Hicks Street Line from South Ferry to the depot, and the Park Avenue Line from Downtown Brooklyn east to Bushwick. Additionally, the Atlantic Avenue Railroad obtained a lease on the Ninth Avenue Depot. Culver had long desired to rid himself of the horse line, preferring to operate only the steam extension.

In an article in The Brooklyn Union, it was reported that the heads of some other Brooklyn railroads believed that the value of the Vanderbilt Avenue Line was much higher than what Richardson agreed to spend given the connections available on additional routes his company operated. They also said that the value of Culver's steam railroad increased as more people would be able to get to his line on one fare via the Vanderbilt Avenue Line, proposed extensions, and transfers between lines. On December 21, 1885, the Brooklyn Aldermen authorized the Atlantic Avenue Railroad to extend the Vanderbilt Avenue Line east along Park Avenue, across Broadway, and via Central Avenue to the City Line at the Cemetery of the Evergreens. This extension was expected to be completed in the spring.

In May 1886, President William Richardson of the Atlantic Avenue Railroad got permission from a majority of property owners along Vanderbilt Avenue to replace the horsecar line with a cable car line. On October 4, 1886, the Brooklyn Aldermen granted a franchise to the Atlantic Avenue Railroad to use cable cars on the line. In May 1889, The Brooklyn Daily Eagle reported that the Vanderbilt Avenue Line had relatively low ridership on weekdays, but might have been the busiest line in Brooklyn on Sundays between 1 p.m. and 7 p.m., with cars completely packed with passengers due to its link to Culver Depot. The installation of cable on the line had not yet been implemented.

Seventh Avenue horse cars were replaced with electric trolleys on July 17, 1893. Electric operations on the Vanderbilt Avenue Line began in December 1893. The Nassau Electric Railroad began operating the Vanderbilt Avenue Line under lease (of the Atlantic Avenue Railroad) on April 5, 1896, and the Brooklyn Heights Railroad leased the Nassau Electric on December 31, 1899.

Between 1900 and August 28, 1929, during the summer, the Vanderbilt Avenue Line was through-routed with the Gravesend Avenue Line (later known as the McDonald Avenue Line) to provide direct access to Coney Island. Vanderbilt Avenue Line service over the Brooklyn Bridge was discontinued on February 17, 1928.

Vanderbilt Avenue Line cars were permanently through-routed with the McDonald Avenue Line on July 15, 1936 to reduce costs. The through route ran between Coney Island via a private right-of-way to Avenue X, along McDonald Avenue, 20th Street, Prospect Park West, Vanderbilt Avenue, Park Avenue, Navy Street, Sands Street, Adams Street, High Street, and Washington Avenue to its terminal at Sands Street. Southbound cars would return via Sands Street, Hudson Street, and Nassau Street, before continuing back on the same route at Navy Street. PCC streetcars began running along the route on December 14, 1936.

On May 6, 1940, streetcars were rerouted via Shell Road and Neptune Avenue instead of along a private right-of-way for the construction of the Belt Parkway. In March 1942, work on Park Avenue for the construction of the Brooklyn Queens Expressway required service to be rerouted along Flushing Avenue between Vanderbilt Avenue and Navy Street. This reroute required the construction of new track on Vanderbilt Avenue between Park Avenue and Flushing Avenue-the last new streetcar trackage built in Brooklyn. In April 1942, the route was extended over the Brooklyn Bridge to Park Row in Manhattan, with streetcars running along Sands Street in both directions. On May 24, 1944, southbound service was rerouted via Washington Street, High Street, and Jay Street, and then off of Washington Street and onto Cadman Plaza on September 22, 1944.

On May 2, 1949, the lines were split due to sewer construction on Neptune Avenue in Coney Island, with Vanderbilt Avenue streetcars ending at the depot at 20th Street and Prospect Park West, and McDonald Avenue streetcars running from the depot to Avenue X. Through service resumed on August 2, 1949. On March 6, 1950, with the discontinuation of streetcar service on the Brooklyn Bridge, the route was truncated to they streetcar loop of Sands Street, Adams Street, Prospect Street, and Jay Street.

=== Bus service ===
Through service ended for good on August 19, 1950 with the replacement of streetcars on the Vanderbilt Avenue Line with buses. The change was precipitated by the closure of two blocks of Hudson Avenue used by the line between Nassau Street and Sands Street as part of the construction of the Farragut Houses. The replacement was made as an emergency measure that was subject to approval by the New York City Board of Estimate. The new bus route, numbered the B69, would run every six minutes during rush hours, with service operated using 13 buses, while ten buses would operate along the route during other hours, running every eight minutes.

This new route would have almost the same route, though buses would run along Gold Street instead of Hudson Avenue, and northbound buses would initially operate along Prospect Park West, 15th Street, Eighth Avenue, and Union Street to Vanderbilt Avenue since Prospect Park West was a one-way street northbound for vehicles not on rails. The Board of Transportation was expected to request that the Department of Traffic make Prospect Park West a two-way street between Union Street and 15th Street, allowing northbound service to move back to that thoroughfare. It was also expected to seek authorization to replace streetcars with buses on the Smith Street Line, which shared trackage with the Vanderbilt Avenue Line along Prospect Park West.

Streetcar service along McDonald Avenue continued operating until October 30, 1956, when it was discontinued. The B69 was extended to Cortelyou Road to cover part of this route, with the remainder not replaced with bus service since it was directly under the Culver Line elevated of the subway system.

The Seventh Avenue streetcar line was replaced with the B67 bus route on February 11, 1951.

Effective June 27, 2010, the B69 was rerouted south of Flatbush Avenue. Southbound buses had previously traveled south along Prospect Park West, and east on 19th Street to the terminal, with northbound buses continuing east on 19th Street, south on 10th Avenue, west on 20th Street, north on Prospect Park West, west on 15th Street, north on Eighth Avenue, and west on Union Street. Prospect Park West (southbound) and Eighth Avenue (north). This section of the route was discontinued, running north along Flatbush Avenue, before running along the path of the B67 south along Seventh Avenue, 19th Street and 10th Avenue (southbound buses) or 20th Street (northbound buses), and south along McDonald Avenue to the route's new terminal at Cortelyou Road. The span of service on both the B67 and B69 were reduced so that service on the shared section matched the former frequency of the B67. In addition, overnight B67 service was eliminated, the span of weekday B69 service was reduced, and weekend B69 service was discontinued. In September 2011, rush hour service on the two routes was adjusted to reduce bus bunching.

On January 6, 2013, weekend service on the B69 was restored as part of the MTA's Service Enhancement Plan, which was released in July 2012. As part of this plan, on September 9, 2013, the B67 route was extended into South Williamsburg on weekdays between 5 a.m. and 7 p.m. via the Brooklyn Navy Yard and Vinegar Hill to serve new economic activity. Along with Downtown Brooklyn, both Dumbo and the Brooklyn Navy Yard are part of the Brooklyn Tech Triangle, a cluster of economic activity occurring in Brooklyn.

On December 1, 2022, the MTA released a draft redesign of the Brooklyn bus network. As part of the redesign, B67 service east of York Street would be discontinued, since the B62 bus would provide service to the Brooklyn Navy Yard. Closely-spaced stops would also be eliminated. The B69 service south of Prospect Park West would be discontinued, though the B67 would continue to serve that segment. B69 service north of Flushing Avenue would take over B48's route to Greenpoint, while the B48 would take over the B69's route north of Flushing Avenue. Closely spaced stops would also be eliminated.
