= Avenue U station (IND Culver Line) =

New York City Subway station in Brooklyn

Avenue U
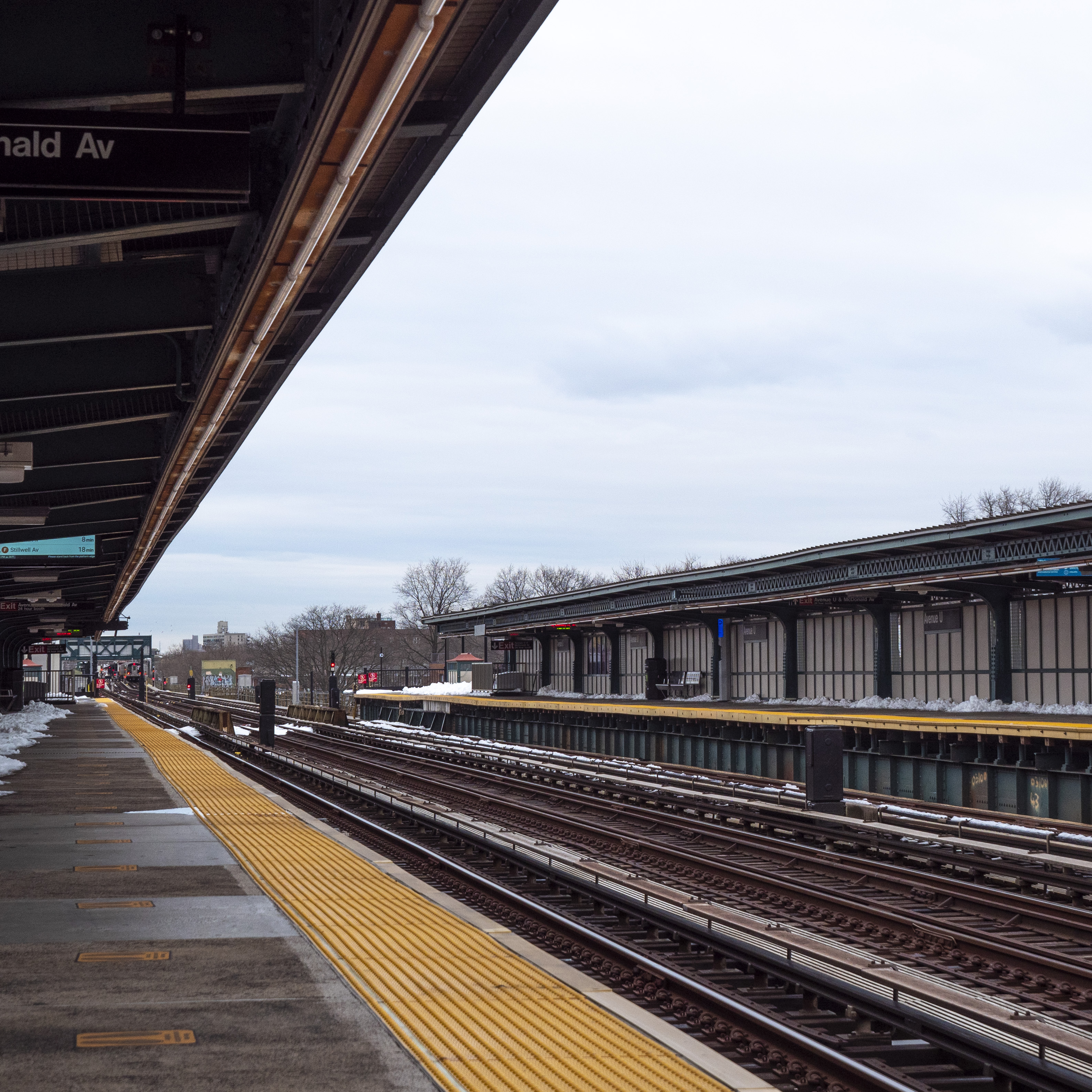
- View from the southbound platform

Station statistics
- Address: Avenue U & McDonald Avenue; Brooklyn, New York
- Borough: Brooklyn
- Locale: Gravesend
- Coordinates: 40°35′46.14″N 73°58′23.95″W
- Division: B (IND, formerly BMT)
- Line: IND Culver Line; BMT Culver Line (formerly)
- Services: F (all times) <F> (two rush hour trains, peak direction)
- Transit: NYCT Bus: B3
- Structure: Elevated
- Platforms: 2 side platforms
- Tracks: 3 (2 in regular service)

Other information
- Opened: May 10, 1919 (107 years ago)
- Former/other names: Gravesend

Traffic
- 2025: 428,327 ▲10.7%
- Rank: 401 out of 423
Services
Preceding station	New York City Subway	Following station
Kings Highway F <F> toward Jamaica–179th Street	Local	Avenue X F <F> toward Coney Island–Stillwell Avenue
Location
Location within New York City Subway
Location within New York City
Location within New York
Track layout
Street map
Station service legend
Symbol	Description
Stops all times	Stops all times
Stops rush hours in the peak direction only (limited service)	Stops rush hours in the peak direction only (limited service)
Stops weekdays and weekday late nights	Stops weekdays and weekday late nights

The Avenue U station is a local station on the IND Culver Line of the New York City Subway, located at the intersection of Avenue U and McDonald Avenue in Gravesend, Brooklyn. It is served by the F train at all times and the <F> train during rush hours in the peak direction.

== History ==
As part of Contract 4 of the Dual Contracts, between the city and the BRT, a three-track elevated railway was built above the surface Culver Line from the Fifth Avenue Elevated southeast and south to Coney Island. The Culver Line was operated as a branch of the Fifth Avenue Elevated, with a free transfer at Ninth Avenue to the West End Line into the Fourth Avenue Subway. Avenue U station opened as the line was extended from Kings Highway at noon on May 10, 1919.

On October 30, 1954, this station began being served by IND D Concourse Express trains operating to Coney Island–Stillwell Avenue as the connection between the IND South Brooklyn Line at Church Avenue and the BMT Culver Line at Ditmas Avenue opened. BMT Culver Line (5) trains were truncated to Ditmas Avenue, the south end of the connection, operating through to Manhattan via the Nassau Street Loop during the day, and terminating at Ninth Avenue at other times. This Culver Shuttle became full-time on May 28, 1959, and was discontinued in 1975.

From June 7, 2016, to May 8, 2017, the Coney Island-bound platform of this station was closed for renovations as part of a $140 million renewal project on the Culver Line. The Manhattan-bound platform was closed for a longer period of time, from May 22, 2017, until July 30, 2018.

== Station layout ==
This station has two side platforms and three tracks with the middle track unused in revenue service. The two platforms have beige windscreens and green canopies that run for nearly the entire length. The north end has black waist-level fences only. The platform signs consist of black boards with "Avenue U" in white lettering.

=== Exits ===
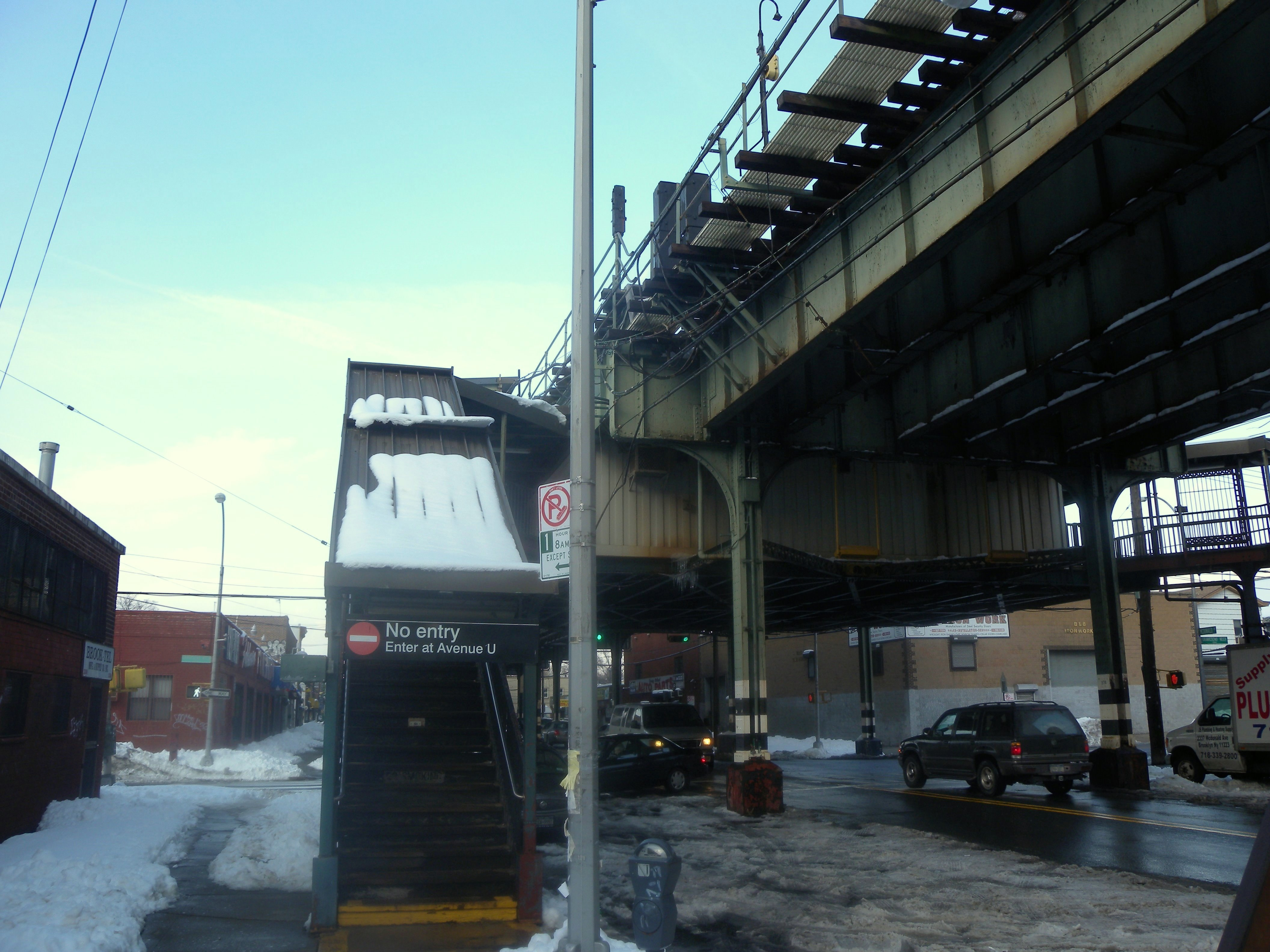
Southwestern exit from Coney Island-bound side

This station has two entrances with the full-time one at the north end. From each platform, one staircase leads down to an elevated station-house beneath the tracks, where a bank of turnstiles and token booth are present. Outside fare control are two street stairs to the two northern corners Avenue U and McDonald Avenue.

At the south end of the station are unstaffed exits leading to Gravesend Neck Road. From each platform, a single staircase goes down to a short wooden landing outside of a sealed station house where a full-height turnstile and emergency gate provide exit from the system. Another staircase then goes down to the street. The Coney Island-bound side is exit-only while the Manhattan-bound side is HEET turnstile access. The station house, now used as an employee-only facility, was once opened to the public and had a booth.
