= 18th Avenue station (IND Culver Line) =

New York City Subway station in Brooklyn

18 Avenue
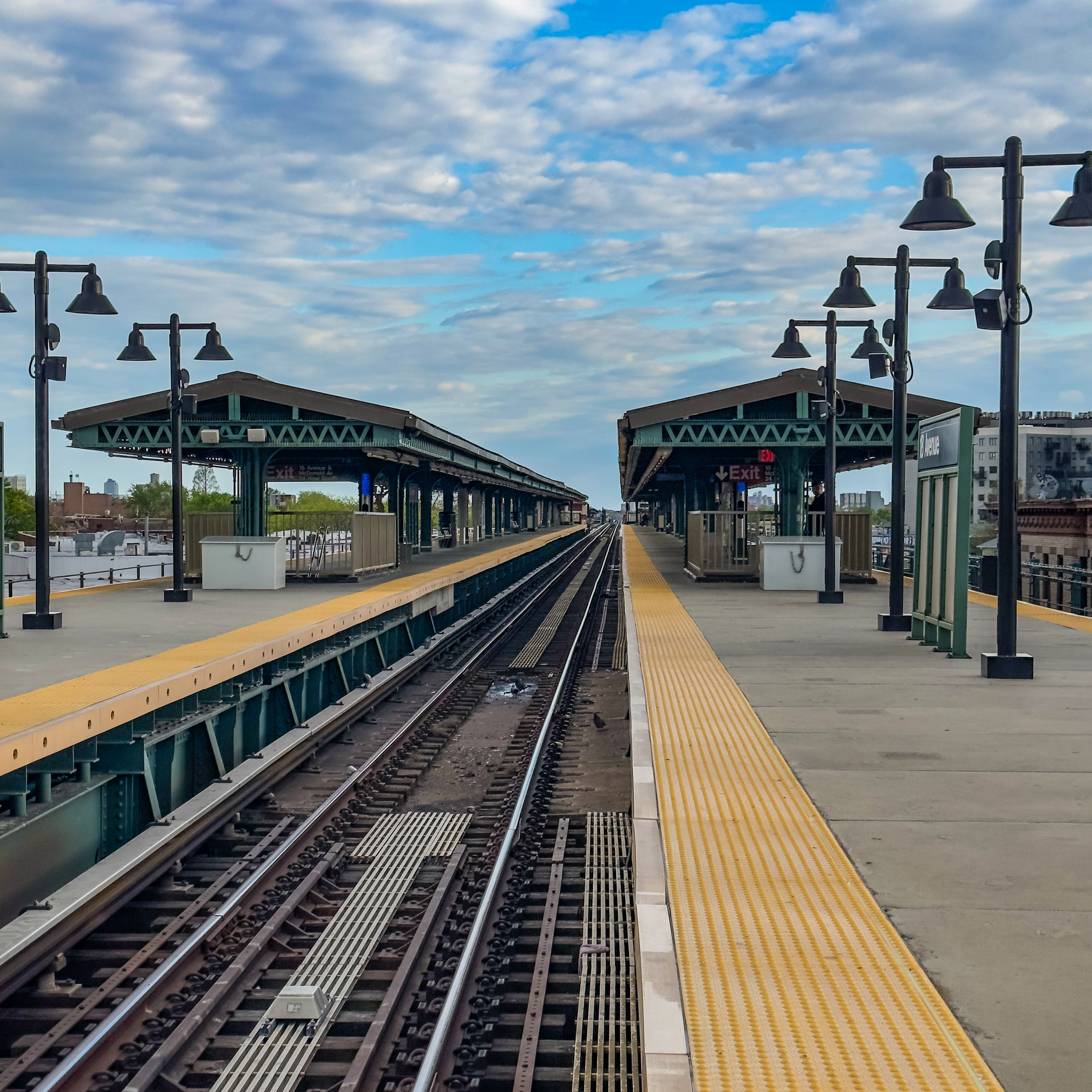
- Renovated island platforms.

Station statistics
- Address: 18th Avenue & McDonald Avenue; Brooklyn, New York
- Borough: Brooklyn
- Locale: Borough Park, Kensington, Mapleton
- Coordinates: 40°37′46.65″N 73°58′37.07″W
- Division: B (IND, formerly BMT)
- Line: IND Culver Line; BMT Culver Line (formerly)
- Services: F (all times) <F> (two rush hour trains, peak direction)
- Transit: NYCT Bus: B8
- Structure: Elevated
- Platforms: 2 island platforms cross-platform interchange
- Tracks: 3 (2 in regular service)

Other information
- Opened: March 16, 1919 (107 years ago)

Traffic
- 2025: 788,976 ▲7.3%
- Rank: 343 out of 423
Services
| Preceding station | New York City Subway | Following station |
|---|---|---|
| Ditmas Avenue F <F> toward Jamaica–179th Street | Local | Avenue I F <F> toward Coney Island–Stillwell Avenue |
Non-revenue services and lines
| Preceding station | New York City Subway | Following station |
|---|---|---|
| Church Avenue express | no service | Kings Highway express |
Location
Location within New York City Subway
Location within New York City
Location within New York
Track layout
Street map
Station service legend
| Symbol | Description |
| Stops all times | Stops all times |
| Stops rush hours in the peak direction only (limited service) | Stops rush hours in the peak direction only (limited service) |
| Stops weekdays and weekday late nights | Stops weekdays and weekday late nights |

The 18th Avenue station is an express station on the IND Culver Line of the New York City Subway, located at the intersection of 18th Avenue and McDonald Avenue in Borough Park, Brooklyn. It is served by the F train at all times and the <F> train during rush hours in the peak direction.

== History ==
This station opened at 3:00 a.m. on March 16, 1919, as part of the opening of the first section of the BMT Culver Line as part of the Dual Contracts. The initial section began at the Ninth Avenue station and ended at the Kings Highway station. The line was operated as a branch of the Fifth Avenue Elevated line, with a free transfer at Ninth Avenue to the West End Line into the Fourth Avenue Subway. The opening of the line resulted in reduced travel times between Manhattan and Kings Highway. Construction on the line began in 1915, and cost a total of $3.3 million.

Trains from this station began using the Fourth Avenue Subway to the Nassau Street Loop in Lower Manhattan when that line opened on May 30, 1931. The Fifth Avenue Elevated was closed on May 31, 1940, and elevated service ceased stopping here.

On October 30, 1954, the connection between the IND South Brooklyn Line at Church Avenue and the BMT Culver Line at Ditmas Avenue opened. With the connection completed, all service at the stations on the former BMT Culver Line south of Ditmas Avenue, including this one, were from then on served by IND trains.

From June 1968 to 1987, express service on the elevated portion of the line from Church Avenue to Kings Highway operated in the peak direction (to Manhattan AM; to Brooklyn PM), with some F trains running local and some running express. During this time period, this station was used as an express station. Express service ended in 1987, largely due to budget constraints and complaints from passengers at local stations. Express service on the elevated Culver Line was ended due to necessary structural work, but never restored.

From June 7, 2016, to May 1, 2017, the southbound platform at this station was closed for renovations, with southbound trains stopping on the center track using the Manhattan-bound platform. The Manhattan-bound platform was closed for a longer period of time, from May 22, 2017, until July 30, 2018, and Manhattan-bound trains stopped on the center track using the Coney Island-bound platform.

== Station layout ==
This elevated station has two island platforms and three tracks, with the center track not normally used. Except for small sections at either ends, both platforms have brown canopies with green frames and support columns for the entire length. The un-canopied areas have black station sign structures.

The 2018 artwork here is called We are each others by Julien Gardair. It features steel figural sculptures on the platforms that are integrated with seating elements, inspired by historical figures and present residents of the area.

=== Exits ===
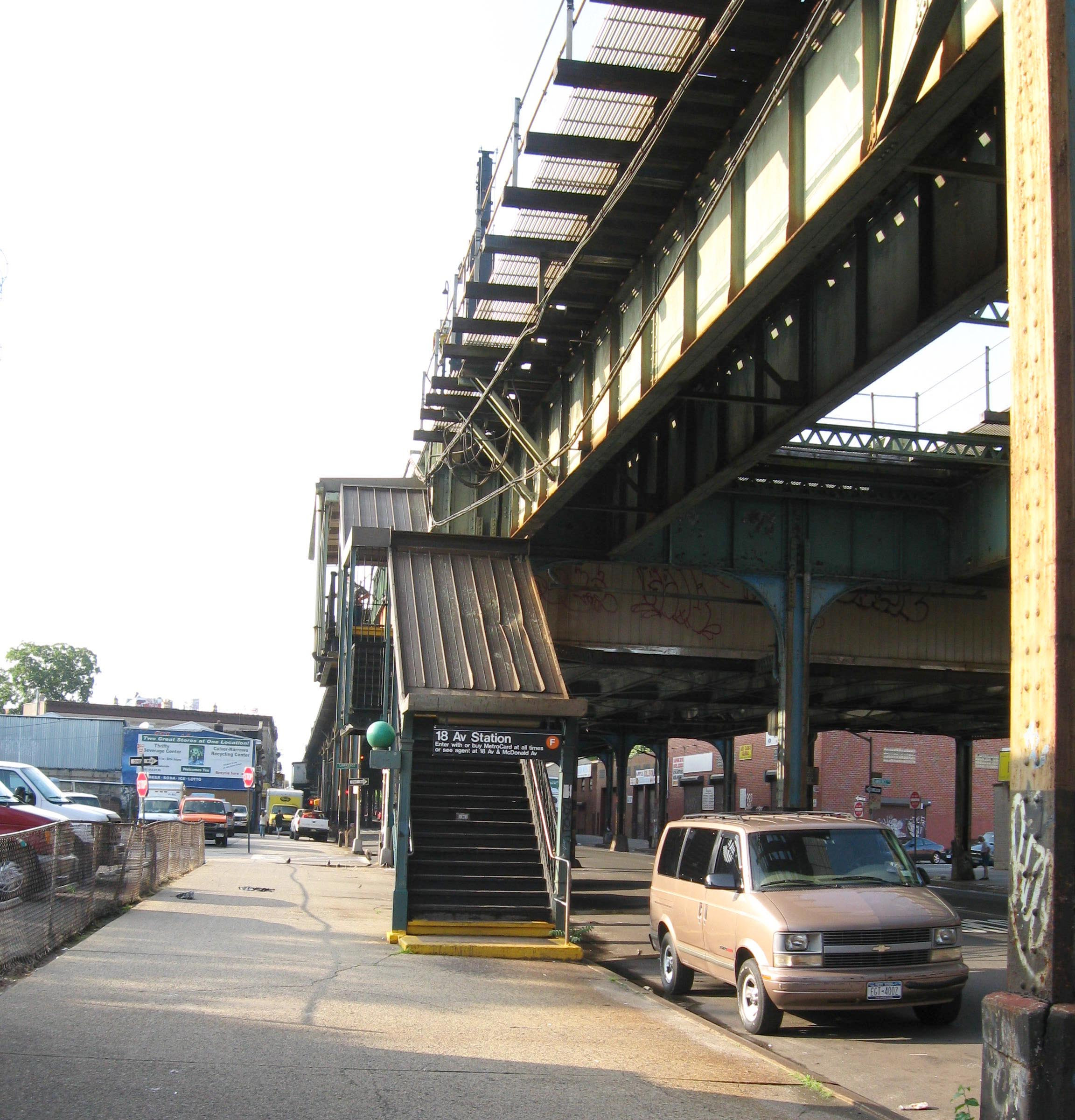
Street stair

This station has two entrances/exits, both of which are elevated station houses beneath the tracks. The full-time exit is at the north end. A single staircase from each platform goes down to a waiting area that allows a free transfer between directions and contains public restrooms. Outside of the turnstile bank, there is a token booth and two street stairs going down to either southern corners of 18th and McDonald Avenues.

The station's other entrance/exit at the south end also has a staircase from each platform, waiting area, and two street stairs going down to either side of McDonald Avenue between Lawrence and Parkville Avenues. However, the station house is unstaffed, containing just High Entry/Exit Turnstiles.

== Track layout ==
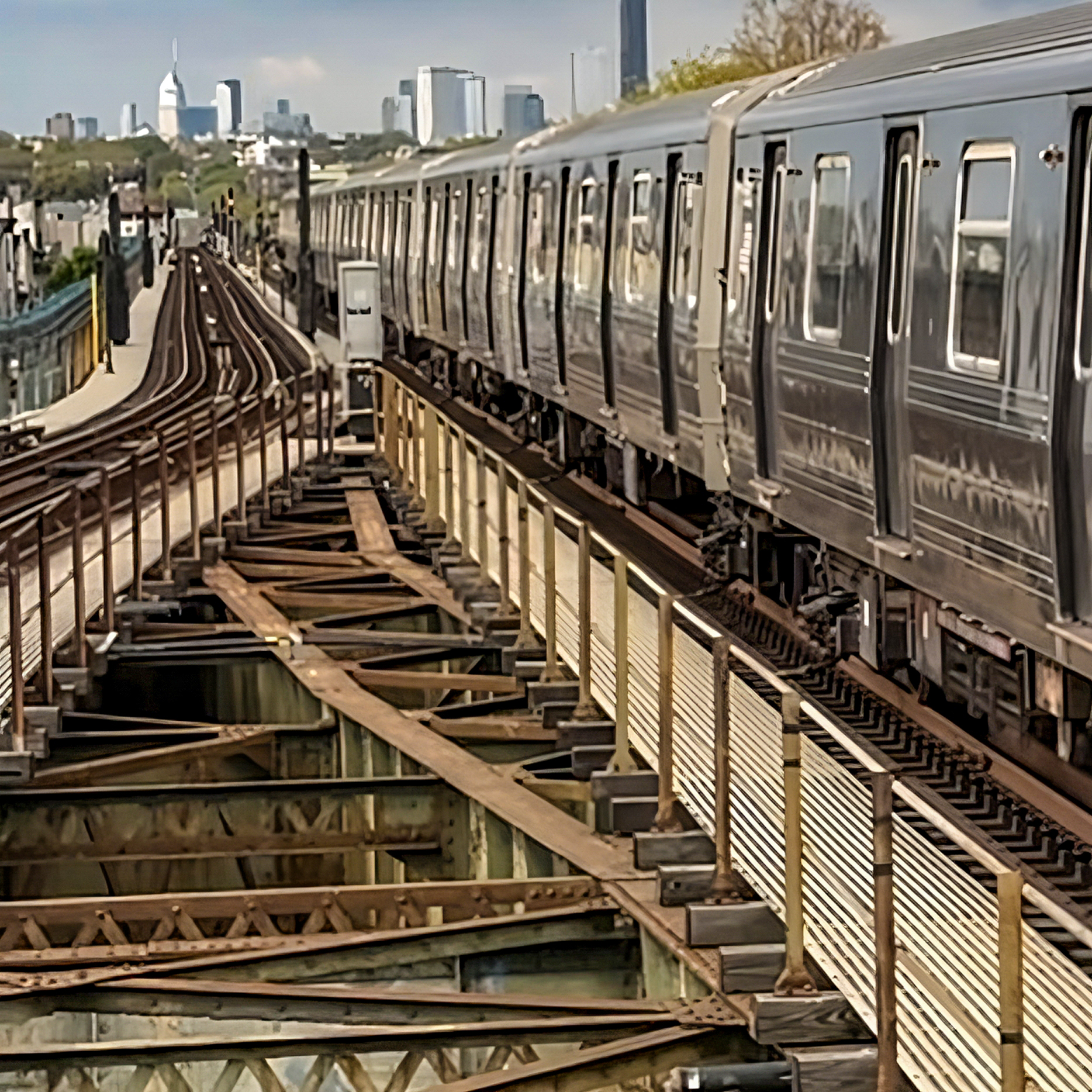
Former diverging switch just north of the station

Just north of this station, a diverging track between the southbound local and center express track was located. Just south of this station, a diverging track between the northbound local and center express track was located. Girders that formerly supported these switches are still visible.

== In popular culture ==
This station is featured in Kevin Smith's film Cop Out as well as in Allen Coulter's film Remember Me, both released in 2010. A chase scene from Joker (2019), starring Joaquin Phoenix, was also filmed here.
