= Bay Parkway =

Bay Parkway may refer to:

- Bay Parkway (Brooklyn) in Brooklyn, New York City
  - Bay Parkway (IND Culver Line), a subway station at McDonald Avenue; serving the F and <F> trains
  - Bay Parkway (BMT Sea Beach Line), a subway station at West Seventh Street; serving the N and W trains
  - Bay Parkway (BMT West End Line), a subway station at 86th Street; serving the D train
- Bay Parkway (Jones Beach) in Jones Beach State Park in Nassau County, New York
