= Ditmas Avenue station =

New York City Subway station in Brooklyn

Ditmas Avenue
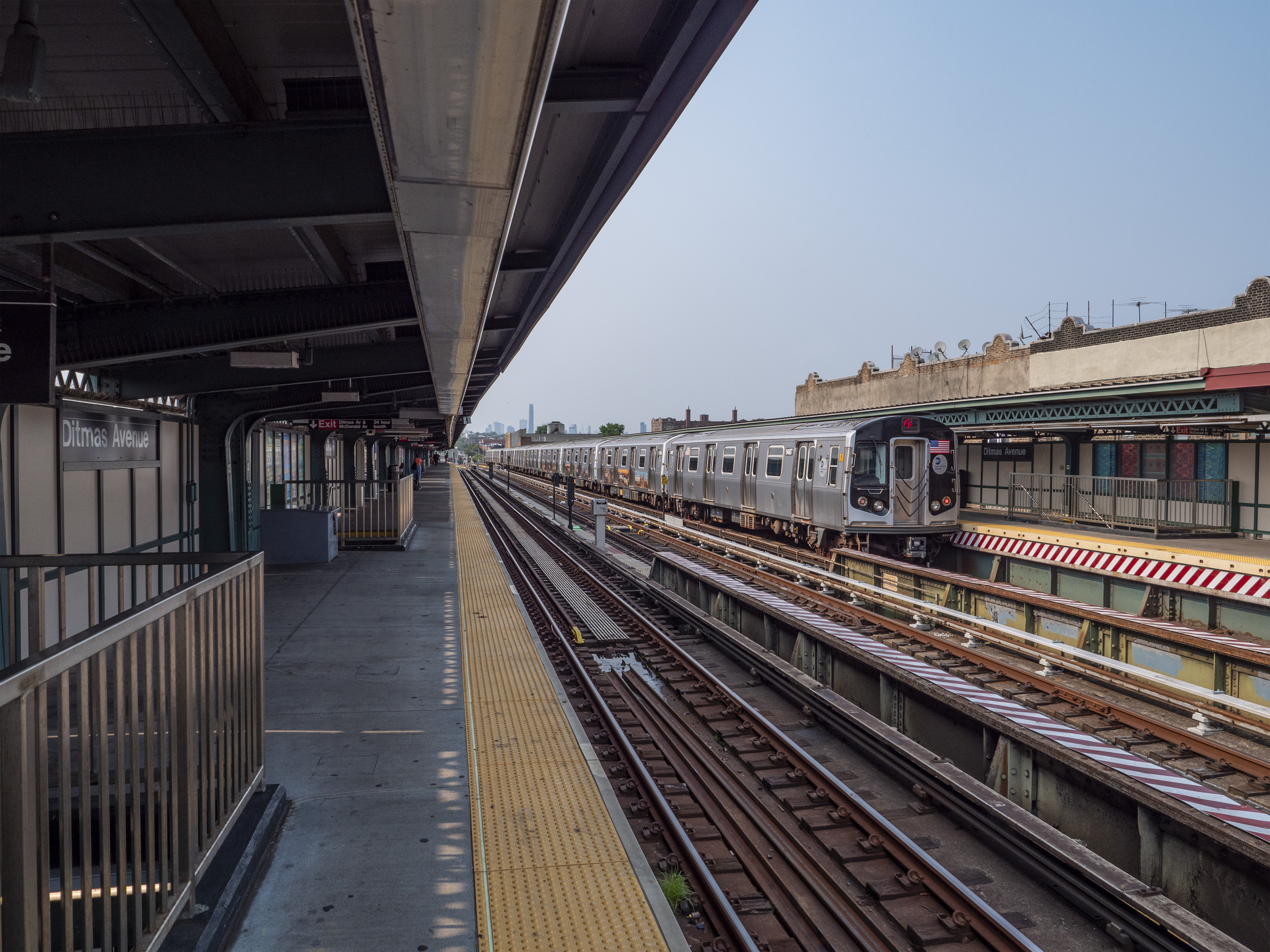
- An R160 F train leaving the northbound platform

Station statistics
- Address: Ditmas Avenue and McDonald Avenue; Brooklyn, New York
- Borough: Brooklyn
- Locale: Kensington, Borough Park
- Coordinates: 40°38′10.55″N 73°58′41.42″W
- Division: B (IND, formerly BMT)
- Line: IND Culver Line; BMT Culver Line (formerly)
- Services: F (all times) <F> (two rush hour trains, peak direction)
- Structure: Elevated
- Platforms: 2 side platforms
- Tracks: 3 (2 in regular service)

Other information
- Opened: March 16, 1919 (107 years ago)

Traffic
- 2024: 855,860 ▼1.5%
- Rank: 324 out of 423
Services
Preceding station	New York City Subway	Following station
Church Avenue F <F> toward Jamaica–179th Street	Local	18th Avenue F <F> toward Coney Island–Stillwell Avenue
Non-revenue services and lines
Preceding station	New York City Subway	Following station
13th Avenue BMT Culver; demolished	no service	
Location
Location within New York City Subway
Location within New York City
Location within New York
Track layout
Street map
Station service legend
Symbol	Description
Stops all times	Stops all times
Stops rush hours in the peak direction only (limited service)	Stops rush hours in the peak direction only (limited service)
Stops weekdays and weekday late nights	Stops weekdays and weekday late nights

The Ditmas Avenue station is a local station on the IND Culver Line of the New York City Subway. Located at the intersection of Ditmas and McDonald Avenues on the border of Kensington and Borough Park in Brooklyn, it is served by the F train at all times and the <F> train during rush hours in the peak direction.

== History ==
This station opened at 3:00 a.m. on March 16, 1919, as part of the opening of the first section of the BMT Culver Line. The initial section began at the Ninth Avenue station and ended at the Kings Highway station. The line was operated as a branch of the Fifth Avenue Elevated line, with a free transfer at Ninth Avenue to the West End Line into the Fourth Avenue Subway. The opening of the line resulted in reduced travel times between Manhattan and Kings Highway. Construction on the line began in 1915, and cost a total of $3.3 million. Trains from this station began using the Fourth Avenue Subway to the Nassau Street Loop in Lower Manhattan when that line opened on May 30, 1931. The Fifth Avenue Elevated was closed on May 31, 1940, and elevated service ceased stopping here. On October 30, 1954, the connection between the IND South Brooklyn Line at Church Avenue and the BMT Culver Line at Ditmas Avenue opened. With the connection completed, all service at the stations on the former BMT Culver Line south of Ditmas Avenue, including this one, were from then on served by IND trains during regular service patterns.

North of Ditmas Avenue, the Culver Line expands into four tracks, two local, and two express tracks and enters the tunnel into Church Avenue, allowing access to IND lines in the other boroughs. Before 1975, the Coney Island-bound platform was formerly an island platform with an extra track. With the opening of the Culver Ramp, the BMT Culver Line north of Ditmas Avenue was reduced to a single-track shuttle. The shuttle ceased operation on May 11, 1975 due to decreasing ridership and most of the structure above 37th-38th Streets were demolished. The fourth track at Ditmas Avenue was removed and the Coney Island-bound platform was converted to a side platform.

From June 1968 to 1987, express service on the elevated portion of the line from Church Avenue to Kings Highway operated in the peak direction (to Manhattan AM; to Brooklyn PM), with some F trains running local and some running express. During this time period, this station was used as a local station. Express service on the elevated Culver Line was ended in 1987 due to necessary structural work, but never restored.

== Station layout ==
Platform level	Side platform
Platform level	Northbound local	← toward Jamaica–179th Street (Church Avenue)
Platform level	Peak-direction express	No regular service
Platform level	Southbound local	toward Coney Island–Stillwell Avenue (18th Avenue) →
Platform level	Side platform
Platform level	Trackbed	Former Culver Shuttle
Mezzanine		Fare control, station agent, OMNY machines
Ground	Street level	Entrance/exit

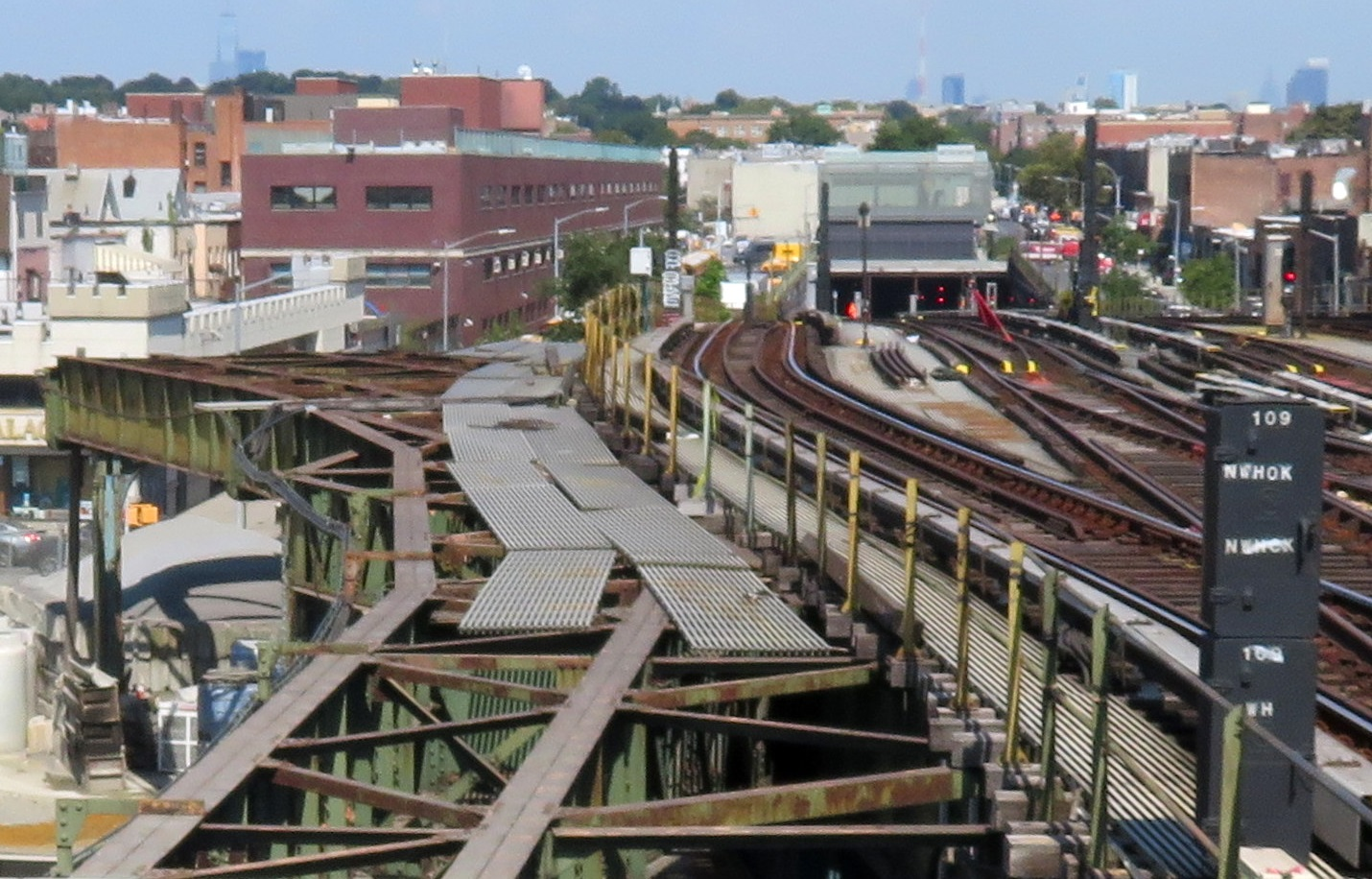
Remains of the Culver Shuttle track and the Culver Ramp connecting the station to the original underground IND Culver Line

This elevated station, opened on March 16, 1919, has three tracks and two side platforms. The center track is not used in revenue service. Both platforms have beige windscreens along their entire lengths except for a small section at the north end. Brown canopies with green frames and support columns run along the center of the platforms. The station signs are in the standard black plates in white lettering. There is an abandoned tower on the extreme south end of the Manhattan-bound platform.

Along the west side of McDonald Avenue, the remains of the Culver Shuttle's fourth track are visible behind the windscreens of the Coney Island-bound platform and more remains show the two-track turnoff just before entering Ditmas Avenue.

=== Exits ===
This station has two entrances/exits, both of which are elevated station houses beneath the tracks. The full-time one is at the south end. Two staircases from each platform outside the canopies go down to a waiting area/crossover, where a turnstile bank of three provides entrance/exit from the station. Outside fare control, there is a token booth and two staircases going down to either southern corners of McDonald Avenue and Ditmas Avenue.

The other station house at the north end also has one staircase from each platform, a waiting area/crossover, and two staircases going down to either side of McDonald Avenue between Cortelyou Road and Ditmas Avenue. However, the station house is unstaffed, containing two High Entry/Exit Turnstiles. Both station house balconies have a high turnstile to allow passengers to enter or exit the station without having to go through the station house. The one on the Manhattan-bound staircase is entry and exit while the one on the Coney Island-bound staircase is exit-only.

== Track layout ==
South of the station there is a double crossover between the southbound local track and the center express track. Also south of this station, there is a switch from the center express track to the northbound local track. There was formerly a switch to the south of the station, from the shuttle track to the southbound local track.

North of the station, the three tracks expand into four tracks, with the express track splitting into two. North of the tunnel portal, there are crossovers between each pair of local and express tracks.
