= Bay Parkway station (IND Culver Line) =

New York City Subway station in Brooklyn

Bay Parkway
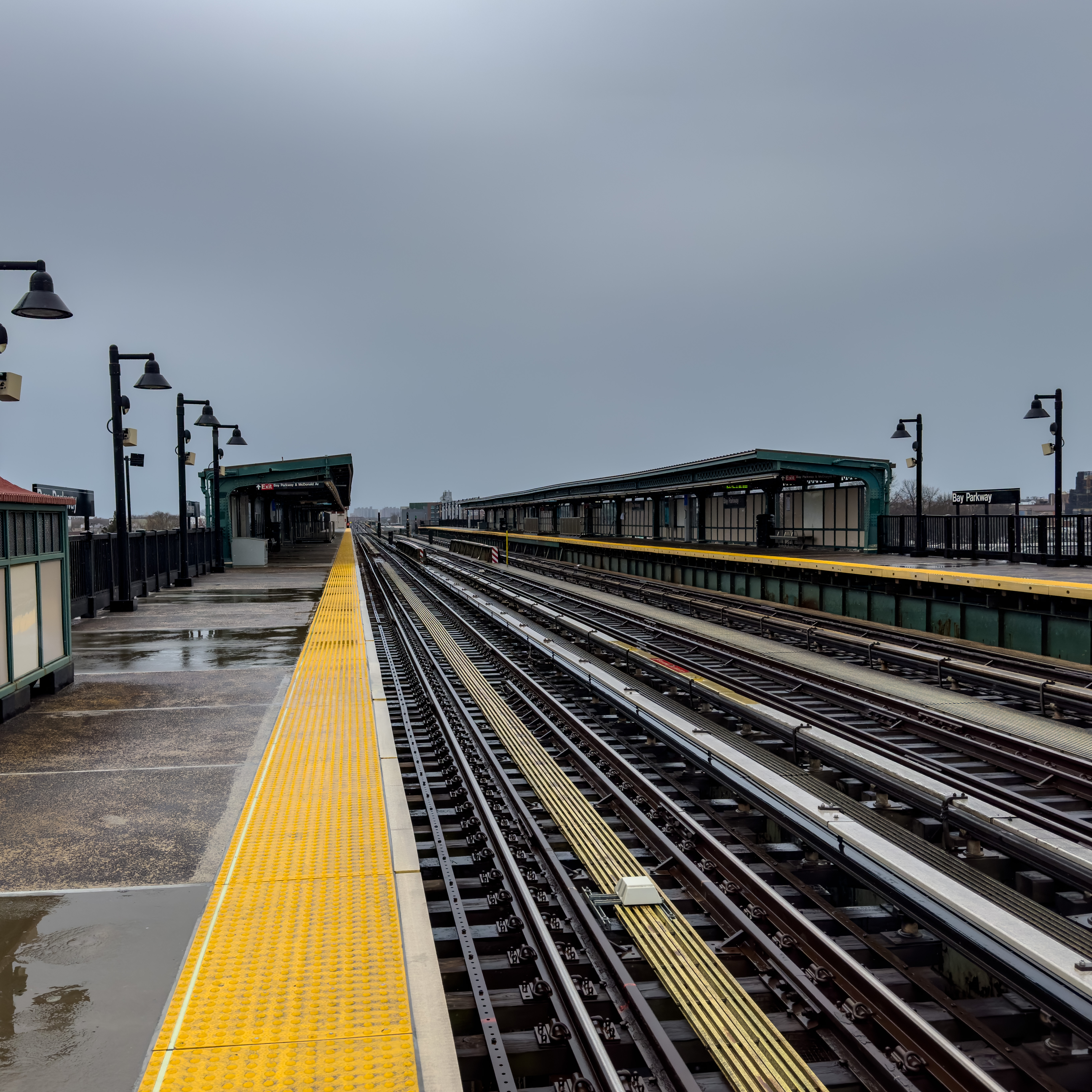
- Northbound and southbound platforms

Station statistics
- Address: Bay Parkway & McDonald Avenue; Brooklyn, New York
- Borough: Brooklyn
- Locale: Midwood, Mapleton
- Coordinates: 40°37′15.1″N 73°58′30.83″W
- Division: B (IND, formerly BMT)
- Line: IND Culver Line; BMT Culver Line (formerly)
- Services: F (all times) <F> (two rush hour trains, peak direction)
- Transit: NYCT Bus: B6
- Structure: Elevated
- Platforms: 2 side platforms
- Tracks: 3 (2 in regular service)

Other information
- Opened: March 16, 1919 (107 years ago)
- Former/other names: 22nd Avenue–Bay Parkway

Traffic
- 2025: 239,898 ▼5.2%
- Rank: 411 out of 423
Services
| Preceding station | New York City Subway | Following station |
|---|---|---|
| Avenue I F <F> toward Jamaica–179th Street | Local | Avenue N F <F> toward Coney Island–Stillwell Avenue |
Location
Location within New York City Subway
Location within New York City
Location within New York
Track layout
Street map
Station service legend
| Symbol | Description |
| Stops all times | Stops all times |
| Stops rush hours in the peak direction only (limited service) | Stops rush hours in the peak direction only (limited service) |
| Stops weekdays and weekday late nights | Stops weekdays and weekday late nights |

The Bay Parkway station (originally 22nd Avenue–Bay Parkway station) is a local station on the IND Culver Line of the New York City Subway. This station is located on the border of Mapleton and Midwood, Brooklyn at the intersection of Bay Parkway and McDonald Avenue above Washington Cemetery. It is served by the F train at all times and the <F> train during rush hours in the peak direction.

== History ==
This station opened at 3:00 a.m. on March 16, 1919, as part of the opening of the first section of the BMT Culver Line. The initial section began at the Ninth Avenue station and ended at the Kings Highway station. The line was operated as a branch of the Fifth Avenue Elevated line, with a free transfer at Ninth Avenue to the West End Line into the Fourth Avenue Subway. The opening of the line resulted in reduced travel times between Manhattan and Kings Highway. Construction on the line began in 1915, and cost a total of $3.3 million. Trains from this station began using the Fourth Avenue Subway to the Nassau Street Loop in Lower Manhattan when that line opened on May 30, 1931. The Fifth Avenue Elevated was closed on May 31, 1940, and elevated service ceased stopping here. On October 30, 1954, the connection between the IND South Brooklyn Line at Church Avenue and the BMT Culver Line at Ditmas Avenue opened. With the connection completed, all service at the stations on the former BMT Culver Line south of Ditmas Avenue, including this one, were from then on served by IND trains.

From June 1968 to 1987, express service on the elevated portion of the line from Church Avenue to Kings Highway operated in the peak direction (to Manhattan AM; to Brooklyn PM), with some F trains running local and some running express. During this time period, this station was used as a local station. Express service ended in 1987, largely due to budget constraints and complaints from passengers at local stations. Express service on the elevated Culver Line was ended due to necessary structural work, but never restored.

From June 7, 2016, to May 1, 2017, the southbound platform at this station was closed for renovations. The Manhattan-bound platform was closed for a longer period of time, from May 22, 2017 until July 30, 2018.

As of 2022, Bay Parkway was the least-used subway station in Brooklyn, with 240,275 riders in 2022, and the least-used station outside of the Rockaway Line.

== Station layout ==
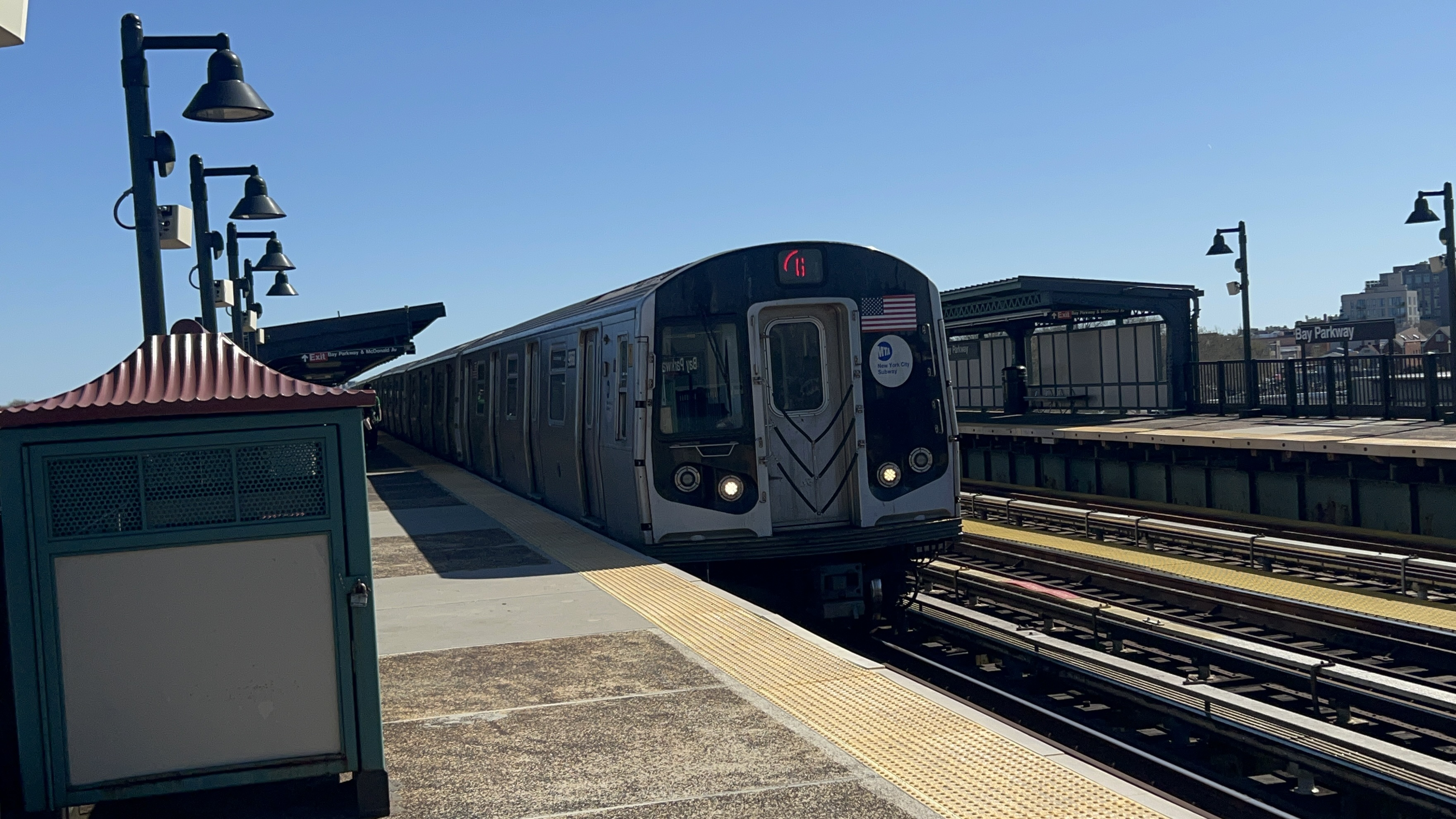
Rerouted G train arriving at the station

This elevated station has two side platforms and three tracks with the center one not normally used. Both platforms have beige windscreens and brown canopies with green frames in the center and waist-high black steel fences at either end. The station signs are in the standard black with white Helvetica font.

=== Exits ===
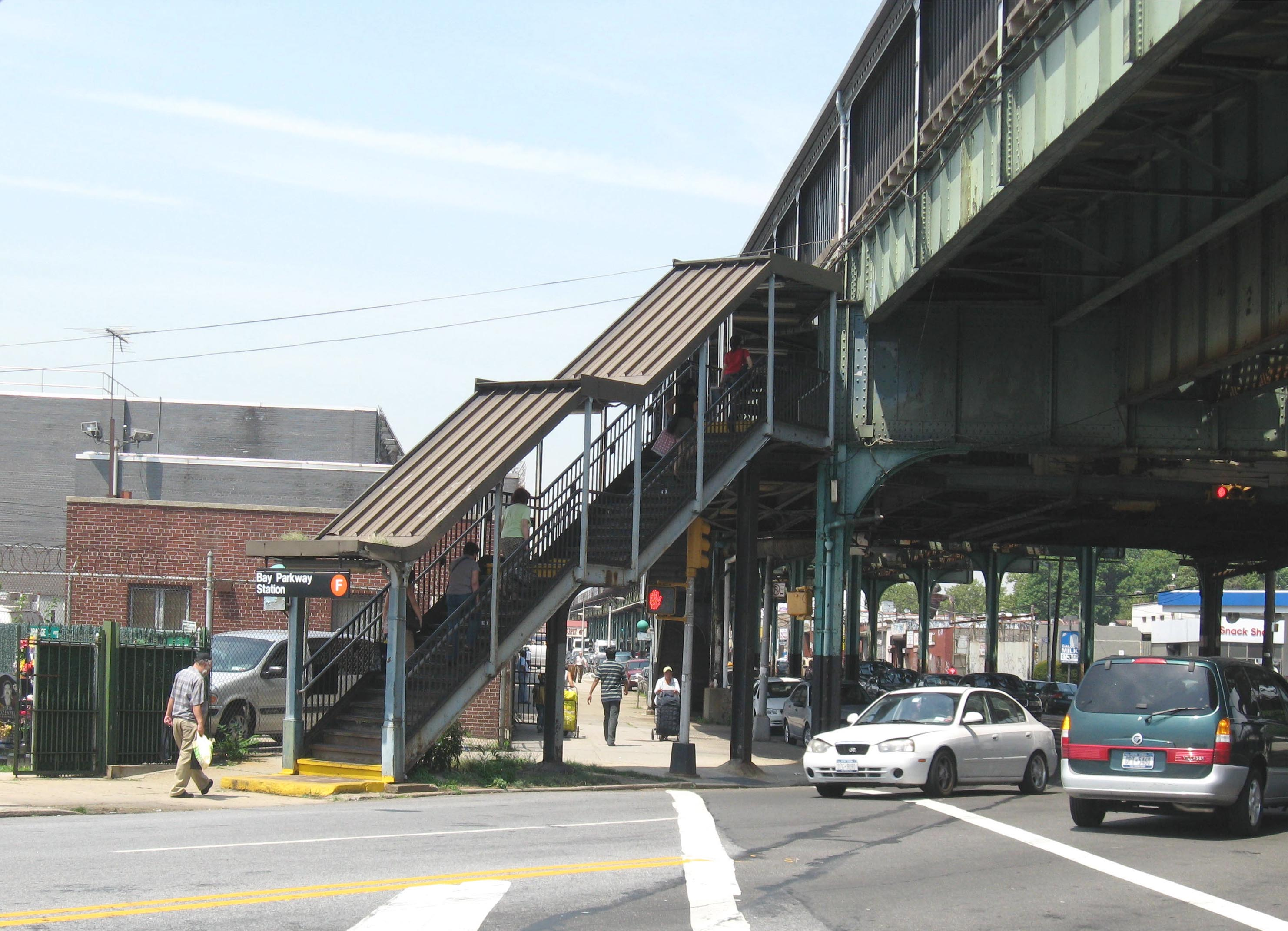
Southwestern street stair

This station's only entrance is an elevated station house beneath the tracks. It has two staircases to each platform at their centers, waiting area, turnstile bank, token booth, and three street stairs. Two of those stairs go down to either northwest corner of McDonald Avenue and Bay Parkway (the southern one is longer since it goes down to the diagonal street of Bay Parkway) while the third goes down to the southeast corner. Both station house balconies have emergency exit doors between the platform stairs and street stairs.

There is a station facility constructed inside the mezzanine on the Manhattan-bound side, giving evidence that there was a fourth staircase that was removed at the northeast corner of McDonald Avenue and Bay Parkway.
