= Culver Shuttle =

- Culver Shuttle

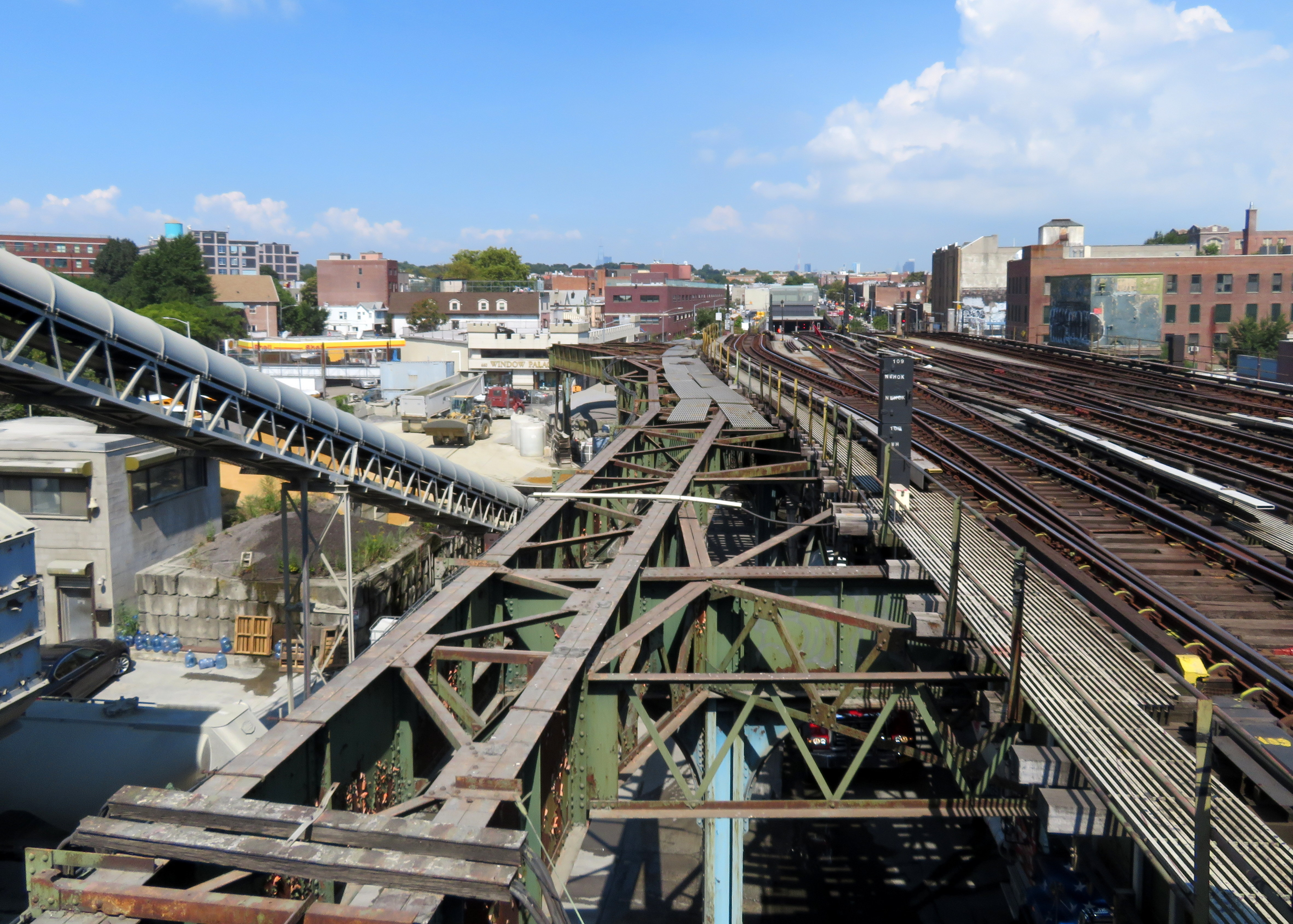
- Remaining trackway of the Culver Shuttle at Ditmas Avenue station
- Northern end: Ninth Avenue
- Southern end: Ditmas Avenue
- Stations: 4
- Started service: October 30, 1954; 71 years ago
- Discontinued: May 10, 1975; 50 years ago

The Culver Shuttle was a New York City Subway shuttle, running along a remnant of the BMT Culver Line, most of which is now the IND Culver Line. The shuttle was originally part of the Brooklyn-Manhattan Transit Corporation (BMT)'s 5 service, providing through service on the Culver Line between Coney Island and Manhattan. The F train is the current successor to Culver Line service. The line had 1,000 riders a day during its final month of service in 1975.

== History ==
The number 5 was assigned in 1924. At the time, all BMT Culver Line trains used the elevated BMT Fifth Avenue Line, running over the Brooklyn Bridge to Park Row. Rush-hour trains made no stops between 36th Street and Atlantic Avenue (both directions in morning rush hour, southbound only in afternoon rush hour).

Subway trains started to run on the Culver Line on May 30, 1931, when the Nassau Street Loop was completed. These trains used the south half of the Nassau Loop, ending at Chambers Street. These subway trains ran on the underground BMT Fourth Avenue Line, running on a now-demolished segment of the Culver Line between Ninth Avenue on the BMT West End Line and Ditmas Avenue. During rush hours and Saturday mornings, they used the full loop, entering Manhattan via the Manhattan Bridge and leaving via the Montague Street Tunnel. These trains only ran to Kings Highway on the Brooklyn end.

Rush hour trains ran express on the BMT Fourth Avenue Line. Trains operating in the reverse-peak direction ran express between Ninth Avenue and Kings Highway. Elevated service was cut back to Ninth Avenue, except during rush hours, when it was extended to Coney Island and continued to run express on the Fifth Avenue Line, and both directions during both rush hours.

The BMT Fifth Avenue Line was closed on May 31, 1940, and from that time all Culver trains used the Fourth Avenue Line subway.

Saturday morning rush hour Culver-Nassau Street Express and Culver Shuttles were discontinued on June 24, 1950.

On October 30, 1954, a connection opened between the BMT Culver Line and the Independent Subway System (IND's) South Brooklyn Line at Ditmas Avenue. BMT Culver Line trains were truncated to Ditmas Avenue, while the D train, a formerly-IND service, now ran on the Culver Line between Coney Island and Ditmas Avenue, continuing to Manhattan. Since 1967, service on the Culver Line to Manhattan has been provided by the F train.

After 1954, some Culver Line trains continued to run to Chambers Street in Manhattan. In May 1959, they were all truncated to a shuttle between Ninth Avenue and Ditmas Avenue. The change facilitated increased service on the other services on the Fourth Avenue Line.

This Culver Shuttle, assigned the label SS in 1960, last ran on May 10, 1975. The elevated trestle between Ninth Avenue and Ditmas Avenue, along with the 13th Avenue and Fort Hamilton Parkway stations stood abandoned until being demolished in the mid-1980s. The only remnants of the Culver Shuttle are the lower platforms and tracks at Ninth Avenue and a section of the trestle attached to the Coney Island-bound platform at Ditmas Avenue. The right of way has been sold, as houses have been built on the old right of way near the Ditmas Avenue station.

As a replacement, the transit authority offered free transfers to the parallel B35 bus route.

== Signage history ==
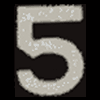
The BMT 5 bullet used on the D Triplex, when the Culver Shuttle was a full route

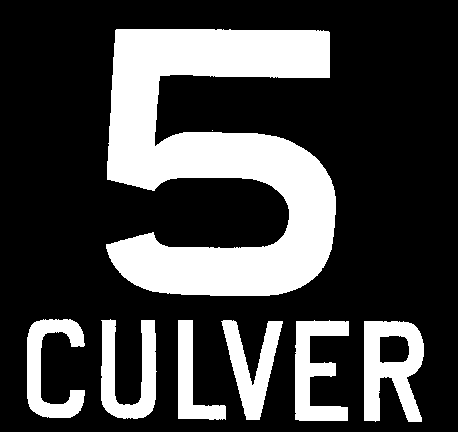
Pre-1967 BMT 5 bullet used on the R1s to R9s

1967-1968 SS bullet

1968-1975 SS bullet
