= Mapleton, Brooklyn =

Neighborhood in New York City

Coordinates: 40.618°N 73.980°W

Mapleton is a neighborhood in southern Brooklyn, New York City, bounded by 16th Avenue on the west, Dahill Road on the east, 57th Street on the north, and 65th Street on the south. It borders Bensonhurst and Borough Park to the west, and Midwood to the east.

The area was originally developed in the 1910s, and was sometimes called "Mapleton Park". Today, Mapleton is an ethnically diverse, mostly residential area with low-density housing.

== History ==
Location in New York City

The site of Mapleton was originally part of the town of New Utrecht in the 17th and 18th centuries. The area, as did the rest of Brooklyn, became part of New York City in 1898.

Mapleton was developed in the early 1910s in conjunction with the construction of the Sea Beach subway line, which replaced a former surface-level railroad. Many of the homes were built on 30-by-100-foot (9.1 by 30.5 m) plots subdivided from former farmland. By 1914, there were dozens of single-family homes being constructed around the nearby subway stations. The eastern part of Mapleton was developed by the Alco Building Company, who built low-density housing in that area, and was known as Mapleton Park. With the opening of the Sea Beach Line in June 1915, Mapleton gained direct subway access to Manhattan, and developers were able to sell $1 million worth of real estate. By December of the same year, it was estimated that the three Sea Beach Line stations in Mapleton accommodated a combined 4,000 passengers daily.

In 1927, Congregation Tiffareth Israel decided to construct a synagogue and yeshiva at 64th Street and 20th Avenue. The foundation of the synagogue and school had been completed in 1924. A new building for the Mapleton branch of the Brooklyn Public Library was constructed starting in 1953, and it opened in 1955.

== Description ==
According to a 2012 New York Times profile of the neighborhood, Mapleton is bounded by 16th Avenue on the west, Dahill Road on the east, 47th Street on the north, and 65th Street on the south. It is mostly residential and contains mainly single-family homes. The portion of Mapleton south of 60th Street is often combined with Bensonhurst, while the portion north of 60th Street is often considered part of Borough Park. The neighborhood is ethnically diverse and contains a large Italian, Jewish, and Asian population.

== Transportation ==
The New York City Subway has several stations in the neighborhood. The BMT Sea Beach Line (N train) runs in a trench between 63rd and 64th Streets, on Mapleton's southwest edge, with stations at 18th Avenue and 20th Avenue. The IND Culver Line (F and <F> trains) runs along McDonald Avenue, near Mapleton's eastern edge, and stops at the Bay Parkway, Avenue N, and Avenue P stations.

The B6, B8 and B9 buses also stop within the neighborhood. The B6 runs along Bay Parkway and the B8 runs along 18th Avenue, while the B9 runs along 60th Street.

== Education ==
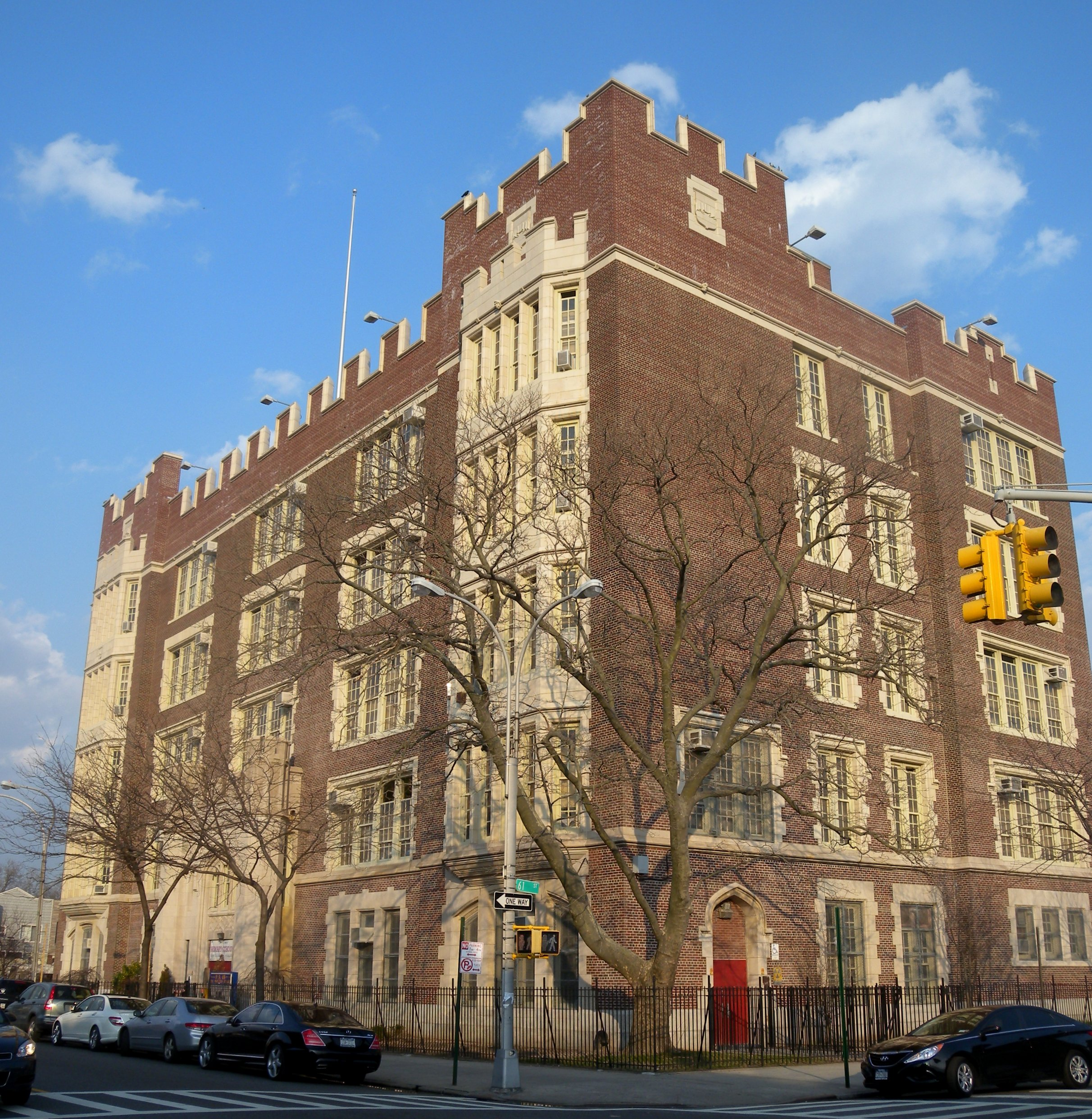
PS 48

The Mapleton School (PS 48) is located at 18th Avenue and 60th Street and serves kindergarten through fifth grade. Mapleton also contains the Franklin Delano Roosevelt High School, located at 20th Avenue and 59th Street.

The Brooklyn Public Library (BPL) has two branches in Mapleton. The Ryder branch is located at 5902 23rd Avenue, between 59th and 60th Streets. Opened in April 1970 and designed by Arthur Witthoefft, the Ryder branch has one of the BPL's busiest circulating collections. The Mapleton branch is located at 1702 60th Street, on the corner of 17th Avenue and 60th Street. Founded in the 1930s, the Mapleton branch moved to its present building in 1955.

== Points of interest ==
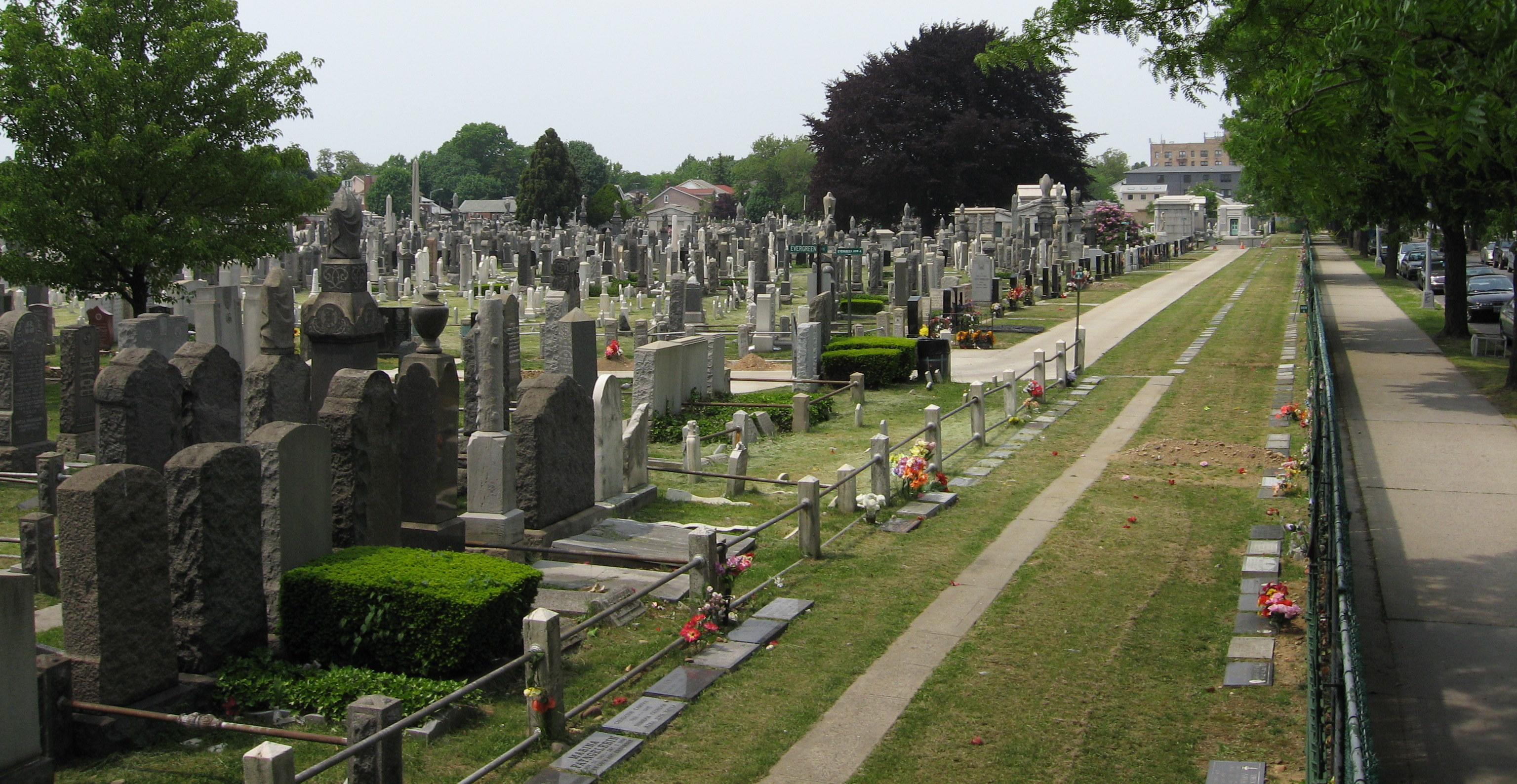
Washington Cemetery

Mapleton contains Washington Cemetery, the largest inhabited Jewish cemetery in New York. Many Orthodox Jews are buried there, as are many prominent people. The cemetery is located on Bay Parkway and stretches from 59th Street to East 3rd Street.

Mapleton contains the 6.38-acre (2.58 ha) Gravesend Park, located on 18th Avenue between 56th and 57th Streets. The park was created in 1917 and was named after the nearby neighborhood of Gravesend. It contains two baseball fields, two basketball courts, fitness equipment, four handball courts, and four playgrounds. Gravesend Park was renovated in 2016 for $7.25 million. Properties in the neighborhood that were too small to develop, such as Dahill Triangle, have also been designated as parks.

The neighborhood also contained a park named Mapleton Park (also known as Mapleton Oval) at 62nd Street and 20th Avenue, which was completed in 1916. The field lasted through at least 1920 and was the home of the Mapleton Park Nine baseball team. The oval may have been named after an old neighborhood name for the area. Today, the legacy of the name Mapleton Park exists in a local synagogue, the Young Israel of Mapleton Park, near 65th Street and Bay Parkway (22nd Avenue).

Maple Lanes, a 48-lane bowling alley, was formerly located at 16th Avenue and 60th Street. It opened in 1960 and was sold in 2012 to a developer, who planned to demolish the bowling alley to construct condominiums and a synagogue. At the time of its closing, Maple Lanes was one of the few remaining bowling alleys in Brooklyn.
