= Seth Low Playground =

Public park in Brooklyn, New York

Coordinates: 40.608083°N 73.986323°W

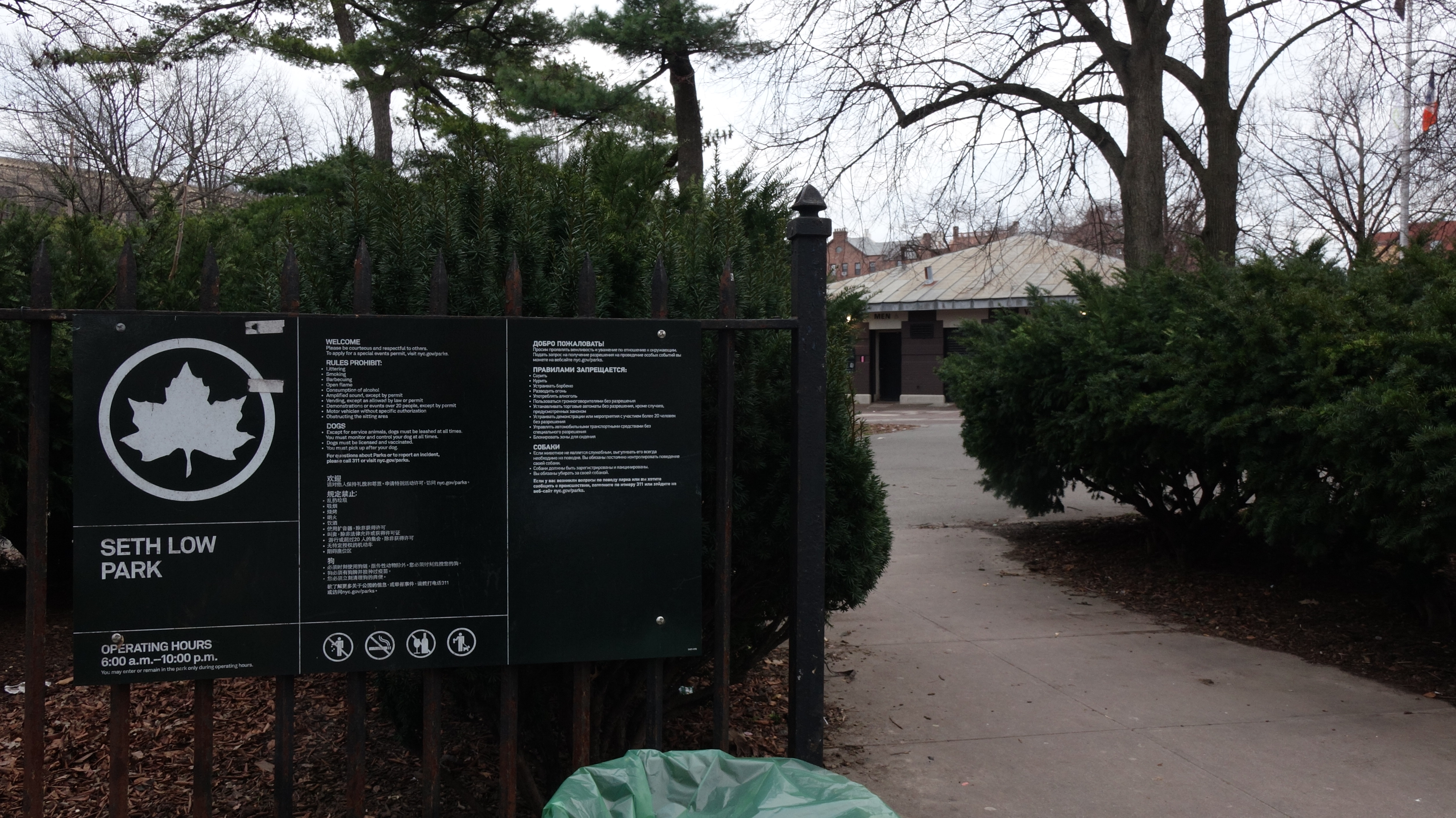
A photograph of Seth Low park in Brooklyn, NY.

Seth Low Playground is a five-acre park located in the Bensonhurst neighborhood of Brooklyn. The park is named after Seth Low, a former mayor of New York City and president of Columbia University. The City acquired this playground in 1924 as a park. Prior to this, it was the site of Indian Pond, a historical watering hole and ice skating location near the border of the former towns of New Utrecht and Gravesend. The park is bounded by Stillwell Avenue, Bay Parkway, West 12th Street and Avenue P. In 1896, the pond was filled with ash from a trash incinerator, covering it entirely.

The smaller part of this park carries the name Bealin Square. The namesake, Sgt. James J. Bealin was the first Bensonhurst resident killed in the First World War. The local American Legion Post also carried his name and lobbied for the Bealin Square designation. The square was named on July 5, 1927. Within this square, the Legion dedicated four trees to local veterans killed in combat: Flight Officer Abraham Elhal (KIA 1944), Sgt. James J. Bealin, Flight Officer Arthur J. Vogel and Lt. Walter V. Sigberman.

In 1946, the Parks Department listed the park as a venue for ice skating on a "flooded area", one of ten such improvised skating rinks in Brooklyn.

The park was called Seth Low Playground by people in the neighborhood, but was only officially designated as such by the city of New York in 1987. The adjacent square was given the same name at that time also.

The park is located one block north of the western terminus of Kings Highway, a historical road that traverses Brooklyn.

A major renovation, the first since 1995, was announced in 2013 and the last phase of the three-phase $4 million renovation of the playground was completed in October of 2017. Just to name a few examples, areas such as the basketball courts were renovated, while the asphalt baseball field was converted into a turf soccer and multipurpose field.
