= Avenue P station =

New York City Subway station in Brooklyn

Avenue P
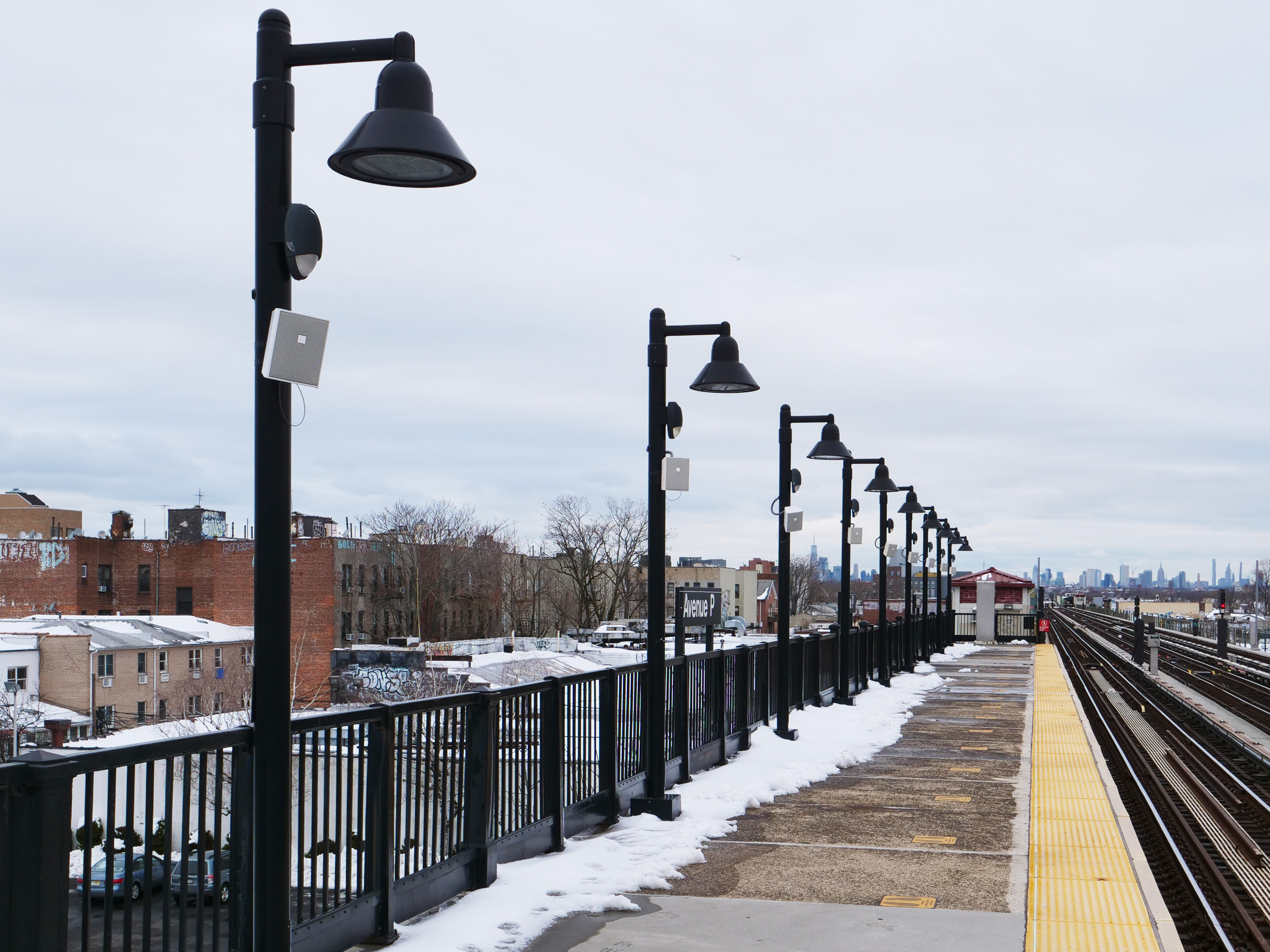
- Southbound platform

Station statistics
- Address: Avenue P & McDonald Avenue; Brooklyn, New York
- Borough: Brooklyn
- Locale: Midwood, Gravesend, Bensonhurst
- Coordinates: 40°36′31.46″N 73°58′22.85″W
- Division: B (IND, formerly BMT)
- Line: IND Culver Line; BMT Culver Line (formerly)
- Services: F (all times) <F> (two rush hour trains, peak direction)
- Structure: Elevated
- Platforms: 2 side platforms
- Tracks: 3 (2 in regular service)

Other information
- Opened: March 16, 1919 (107 years ago)

Traffic
- 2025: 559,221 ▲6.8%
- Rank: 383 out of 423
Services
Preceding station	New York City Subway	Following station
Avenue N F <F> toward Jamaica–179th Street	Local	Kings Highway F <F> toward Coney Island–Stillwell Avenue
Location
Location within New York City Subway
Location within New York City
Location within New York
Track layout
Street map
Station service legend
Symbol	Description
Stops all times	Stops all times
Stops rush hours in the peak direction only (limited service)	Stops rush hours in the peak direction only (limited service)
Stops weekdays and weekday late nights	Stops weekdays and weekday late nights

The Avenue P station is a local station on the IND Culver Line of the New York City Subway. It is served by the F train at all times and the <F> train during rush hours in the peak direction.

== History ==
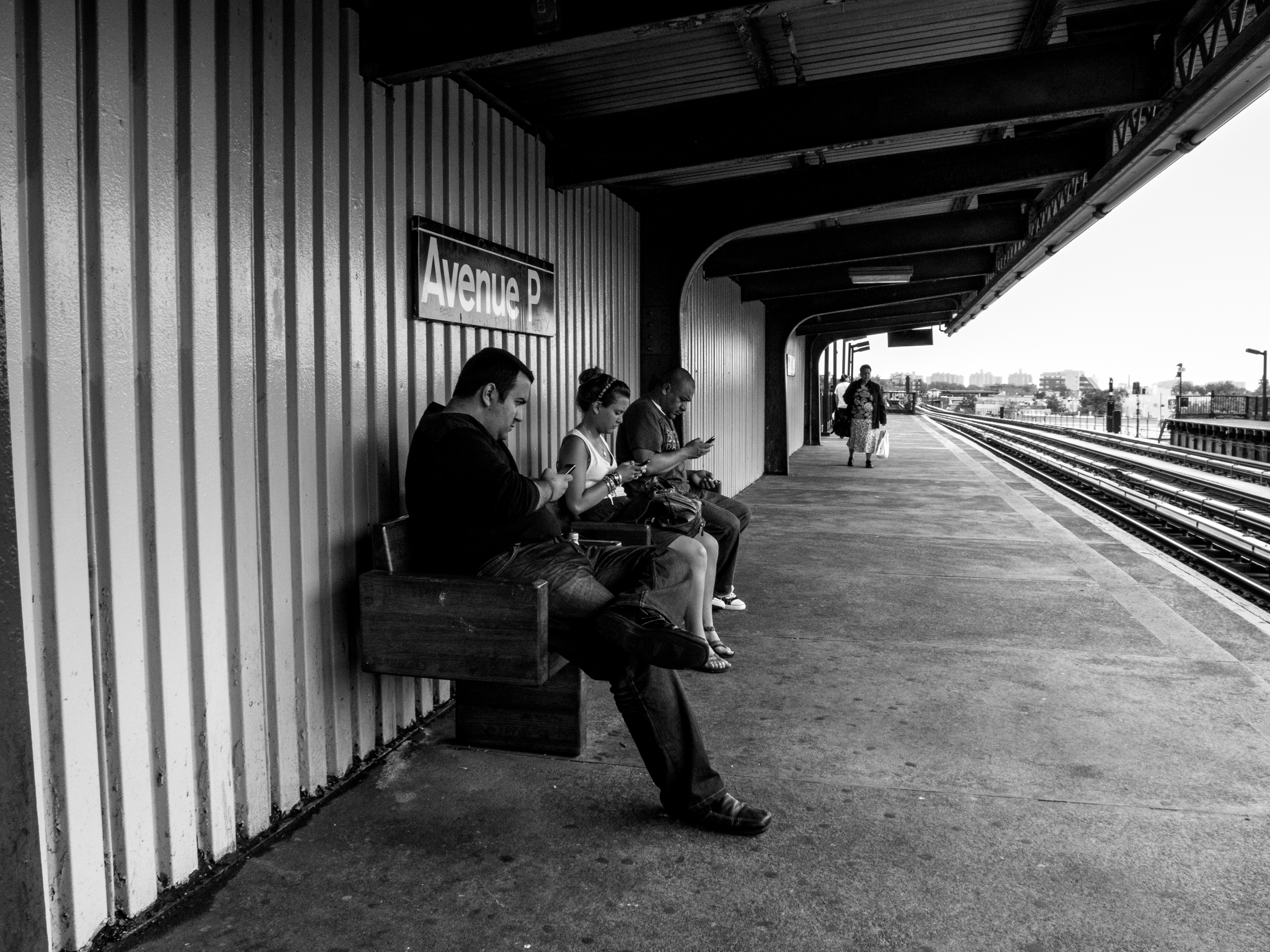
Station prior to renovation

This station opened at 3:00 a.m. on March 16, 1919, as part of the opening of the first section of the BMT Culver Line. The initial section began at the Ninth Avenue station and ended at the Kings Highway station. The line was operated as a branch of the Fifth Avenue Elevated line, with a free transfer at Ninth Avenue to the West End Line into the Fourth Avenue Subway. The opening of the line resulted in reduced travel times between Manhattan and Kings Highway. Construction on the line began in 1915, and cost a total of $3.3 million. Trains from this station began using the Fourth Avenue Subway to the Nassau Street Loop in Lower Manhattan when that line opened on May 30, 1931. The Fifth Avenue Elevated was closed on May 31, 1940, and elevated service ceased stopping here. On October 30, 1954, the connection between the IND South Brooklyn Line at Church Avenue and the BMT Culver Line at Ditmas Avenue opened. With the connection completed, all service at the stations on the former BMT Culver Line south of Ditmas Avenue, including this one, were from then on served by IND trains.

From June 1968 to 1987, express service on the elevated portion of the line from Church Avenue to Kings Highway operated in the peak direction (to Manhattan AM; to Brooklyn PM), with some F trains running local and some running express. During this time period, this station was used as a local station. Express service ended in 1987, largely due to budget constraints and complaints from passengers at local stations. Express service on the elevated Culver Line was ended due to necessary structural work, but never restored.

From June 7, 2016, to May 1, 2017, the southbound platform at this station was closed for renovations. The Manhattan-bound platform was closed for a longer period of time, from May 22, 2017 until July 30, 2018.

== Station layout ==
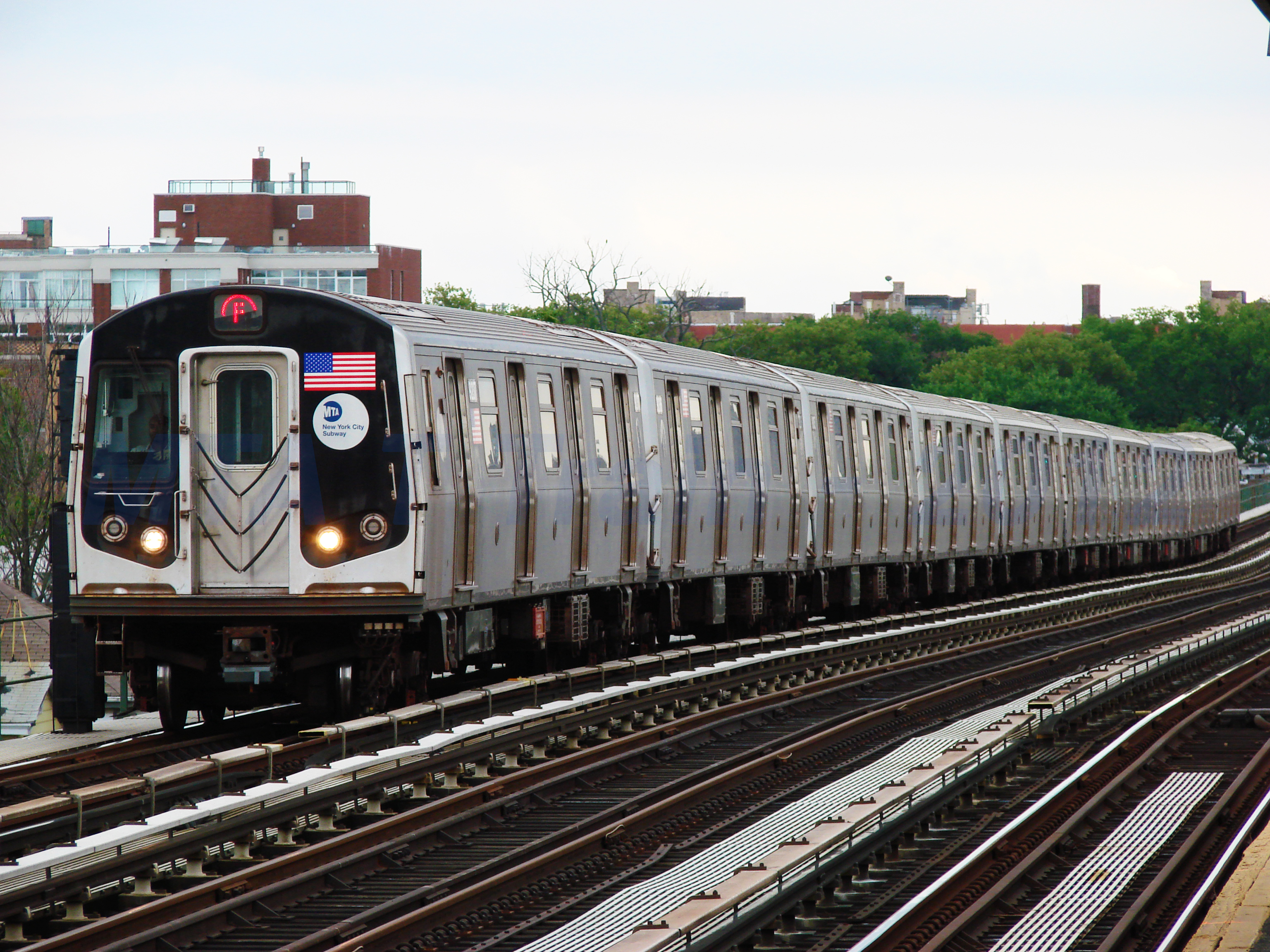
179 Street bound F train arriving at the station

This elevated station has two side platforms and three tracks with the center track not normally used.

=== Exits ===
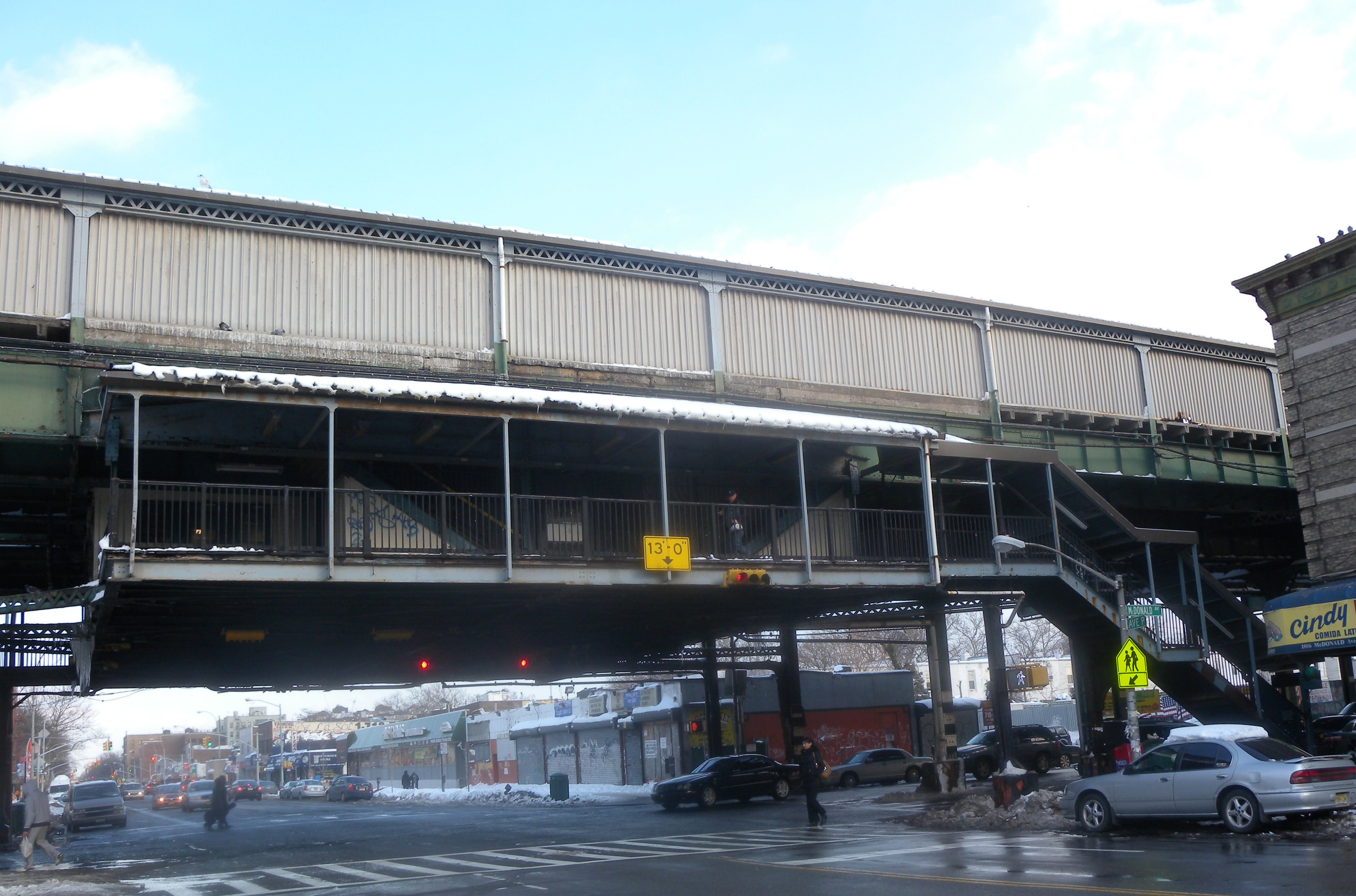
View of structure from street

The station has a full-time mezzanine at Avenue P and McDonald Avenue. It has six staircases: two to the northeast and southwest corners of that intersection, and two to each platform. There is a station facility constructed inside the mezzanine on the Manhattan-bound side, giving evidence that there was a third staircase that was removed at the southeast corner of McDonald Avenue and Avenue P.
