= Kings Highway station (IND Culver Line) =

New York City Subway station in Brooklyn

Kings Highway
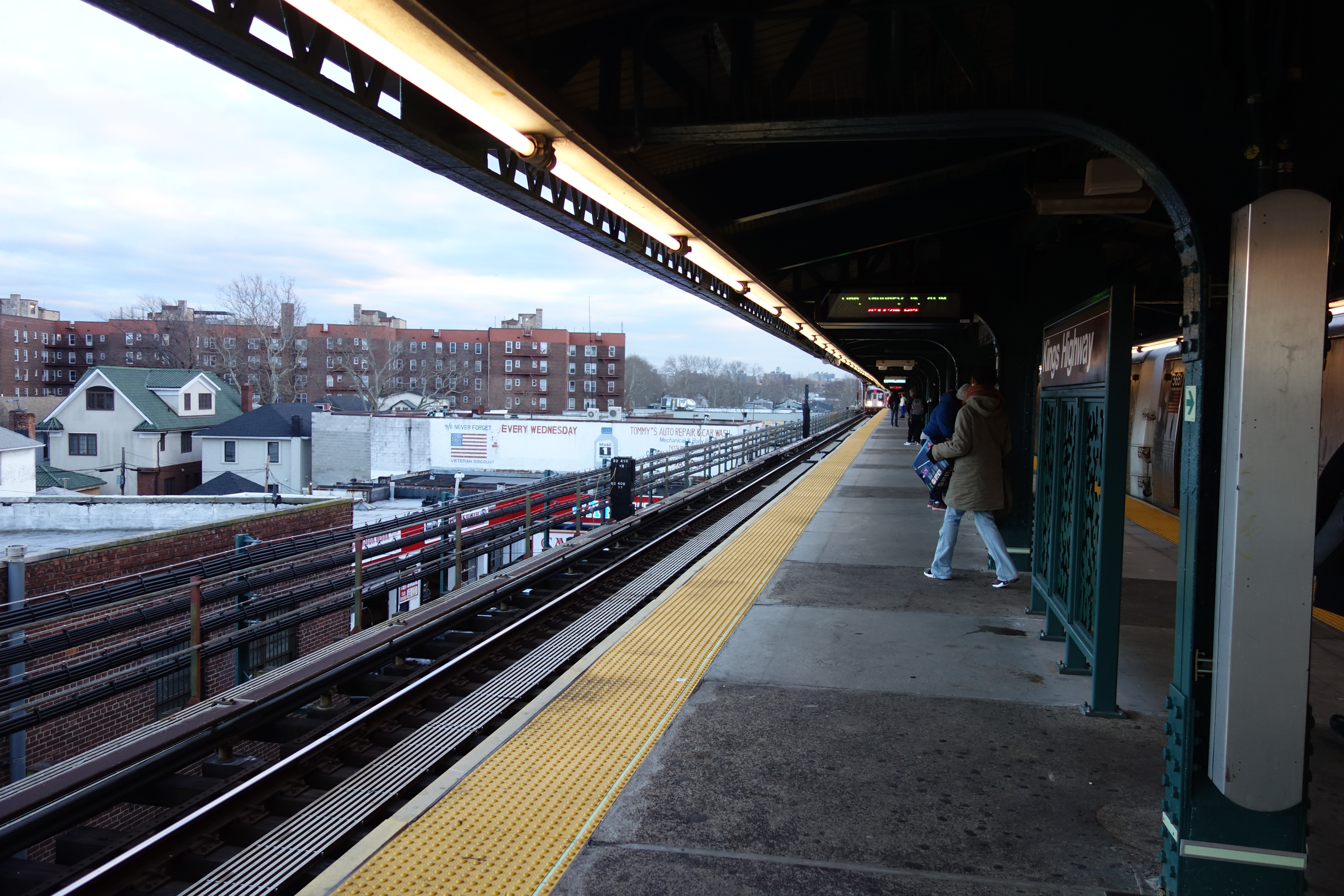
- Northbound platform with an R160 F train arriving in the distance

Station statistics
- Address: Kings Highway & McDonald Avenue; Brooklyn, New York
- Borough: Brooklyn
- Locale: Gravesend
- Coordinates: 40°36′11.47″N 73°58′20.44″W
- Division: B (IND, formerly BMT)
- Line: IND Culver Line; BMT Culver Line (formerly)
- Services: F (all times) <F> (two rush hour trains, peak direction)
- Transit: NYCT Bus: B82, B82 SBS
- Structure: Elevated
- Platforms: 2 island platforms cross-platform interchange
- Tracks: 3

Other information
- Opened: March 16, 1919 (107 years ago)
- Accessible: Yes

Traffic
- 2025: 694,749 ▼9.8%
- Rank: 352 out of 423
Services
Preceding station	New York City Subway	Following station
Avenue P F <F> toward Jamaica–179th Street	Local	Avenue U F <F> toward Coney Island–Stillwell Avenue
Non-revenue services and lines
Preceding station	New York City Subway	Following station
18th Avenue express	no service	Neptune Avenue express
Location
Location within New York City Subway
Location within New York City
Location within New York
Track layout
Street map
Station service legend
Symbol	Description
Stops all times	Stops all times
Stops rush hours only	Stops rush hours only
Stops rush hours in the peak direction only (limited service)	Stops rush hours in the peak direction only (limited service)
Stops weekdays and weekday late nights	Stops weekdays and weekday late nights

The Kings Highway station is an express station on the IND Culver Line of the New York City Subway, located at Kings Highway and McDonald Avenue in the Gravesend neighborhood of Brooklyn. The station is served by the F train at all times and the <F> train during rush hours in the peak direction. Select trains originate and terminate here during peak hours.

== History ==
This station opened at 3:00 a.m. on March 16, 1919, as part of the opening of the first section of the BMT Culver Line. The initial section began at the Ninth Avenue station and ended at the Kings Highway station. The line was operated as a branch of the Fifth Avenue Elevated line, with a free transfer at Ninth Avenue to the West End Line into the Fourth Avenue Subway. The opening of the line resulted in reduced travel times between Manhattan and Kings Highway. Construction on the line began in 1915, and cost a total of $3.3 million.

Trains from this station began using the Fourth Avenue Subway to the Nassau Street Loop in Lower Manhattan when that line opened on May 30, 1931. The Fifth Avenue Elevated was closed on May 31, 1940, and elevated service ceased stopping here. On October 30, 1954, the connection between the IND South Brooklyn Line at Church Avenue and the BMT Culver Line at Ditmas Avenue opened. With the connection completed, all service at the stations on the former BMT Culver Line south of Ditmas Avenue, including this one, were from then on served by IND trains.

From June 1969 to 1987, express service on the elevated portion of the line from Church Avenue to Kings Highway operated in the peak direction (to Manhattan AM; to Brooklyn PM), with some F trains running local and some running express. During this time period, this station was used as an express station. Express service ended in 1987, largely due to budget constraints and complaints from passengers at local stations. Express service on the elevated Culver Line was ended due to necessary structural work, but never restored.

From June 7, 2016, to May 1, 2017, the southbound platform at this station was closed for renovations. The Manhattan-bound platform was closed for a longer period of time, from May 22, 2017, until July 30, 2018.

In 2019, as part of an initiative to increase the accessibility of the New York City Subway system, the MTA announced that it would install elevators at the Kings Highway station as part of the MTA's 2020–2024 Capital Program. In November 2022, the MTA announced that it would award a $965 million contract for the installation of 21 elevators across eight stations, including Kings Highway. A joint venture of ASTM and Halmar International would construct the elevators under a public-private partnership. The northern mezzanine to Kings Highway and McDonald Avenue was demolished and reconstructed to allow for the installation of platform elevators. The elevator towers were erected in mid-2025. The elevators opened in August 2026.

== Station layout ==
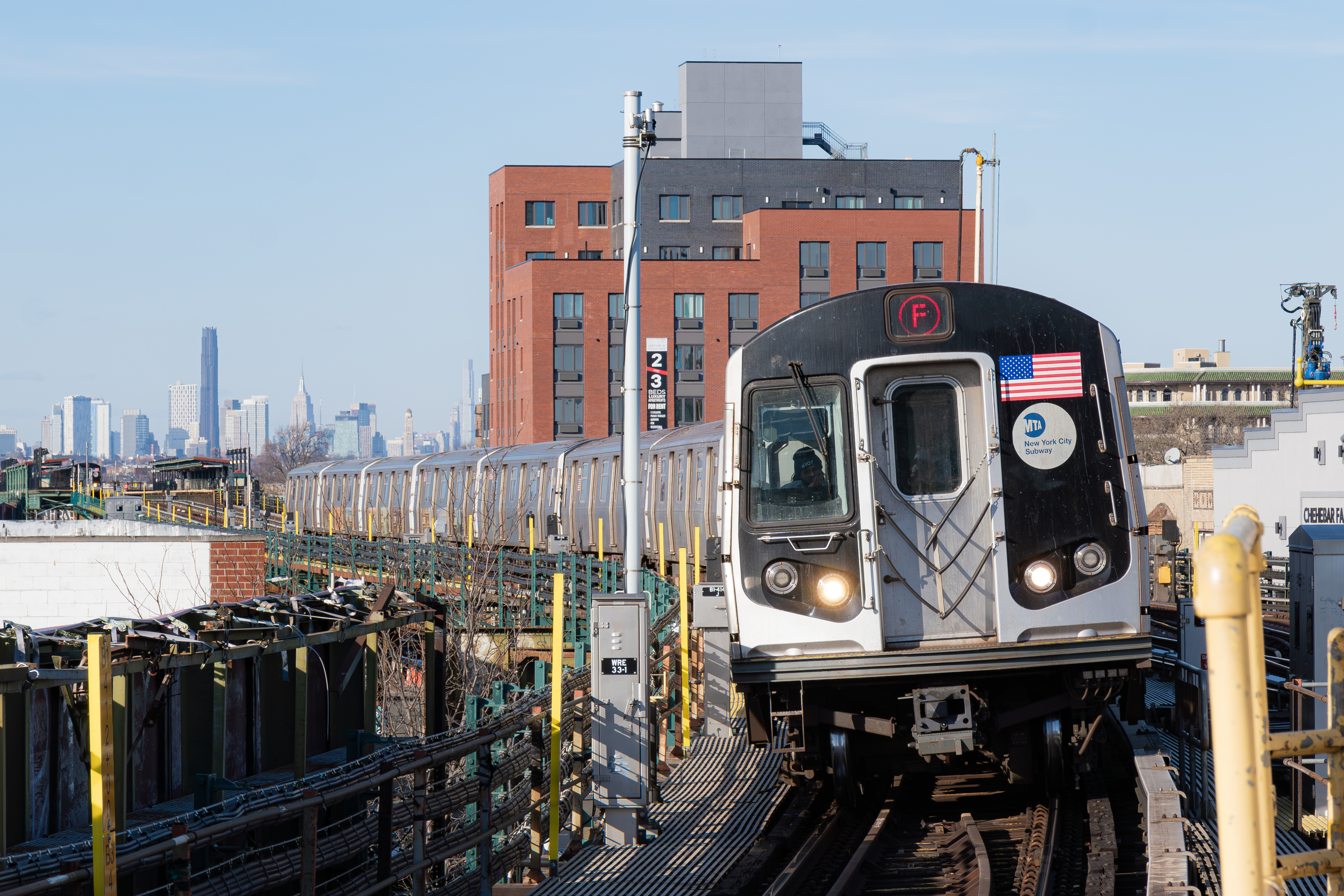
Coney Island bound F train arriving at the station

The station has three tracks and two island platforms. Each platform contains a green canopy with black roofs that run for the entire length except near the north ends, where a control tower is present on the Coney Island-bound platform.

Trains going to Coney Island (southbound) or Manhattan and Queens (northbound) use the local tracks. The center express track is normally used only during rush hours to short turn trains not going to Stillwell Avenue. There are platform signs informing riders that some rush hour 179th Street-bound trains are available from the center track.

There are no express stations south of this station. Instead, the center track offers the option of switching to either local tracks. Diamond crossover switches exist between the center and southbound tracks at both ends of the station. Switches exist at both ends of the station allowing northbound trains to switch from the express track to the northbound local track. Additional switches exist between Avenue U and Avenue X (one each from the center track to the northbound and southbound tracks), and south of Avenue X merging into the southbound local track and the yard leads towards the Coney Island Yard.

The current track configurations allow trains to terminate and reverse at Kings Highway; however, from 1990 to September 2020, the previous configuration did not allow northbound local trains from Coney Island to run express north of Kings Highway without skipping Avenue U. Switches originally existed, but were removed during track rehabilitation projects in the 1990s before being replaced in September 2020 as part of CBTC installation on the Culver Line.

=== Exits ===
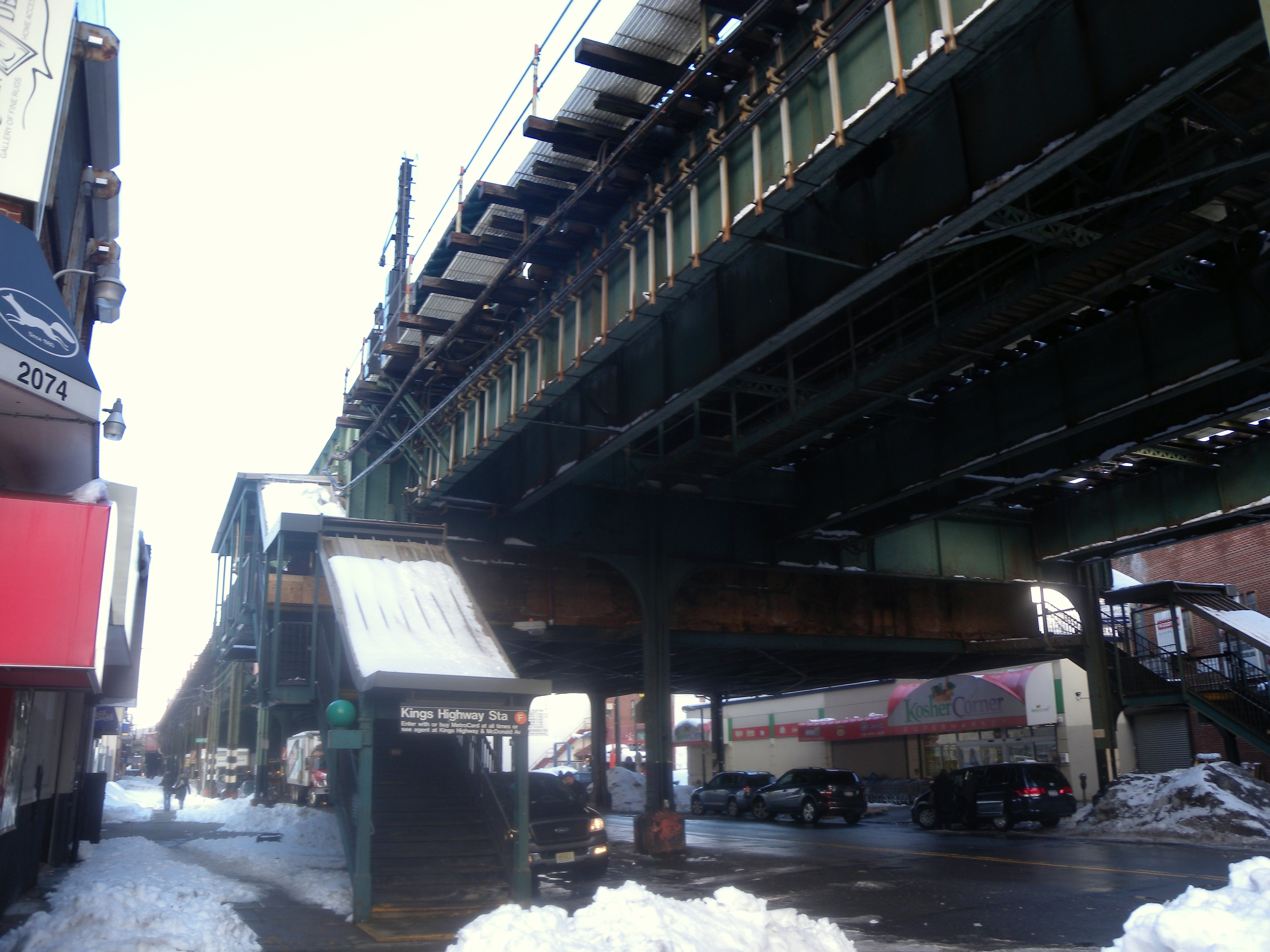
Southwest stair at Avenue S

This station has two entrances with the primary one at the northern end. From each platform, a single staircase goes down to an elevated station-house beneath the tracks. Inside is a token booth and regular turnstile bank. Outside fare control, two staircases go down to either southern corner of McDonald Avenue and Kings Highway.

An un-staffed entrance is at the south end of the station. From each platform, a single staircase goes down to an elevated station-house beneath the tracks. Inside are two HEET turnstiles. Outside of fare control, two staircases go down to either northern corner of McDonald Avenue and Avenue S.
