= Bay Parkway (Brooklyn) =

Avenue in Brooklyn, New York

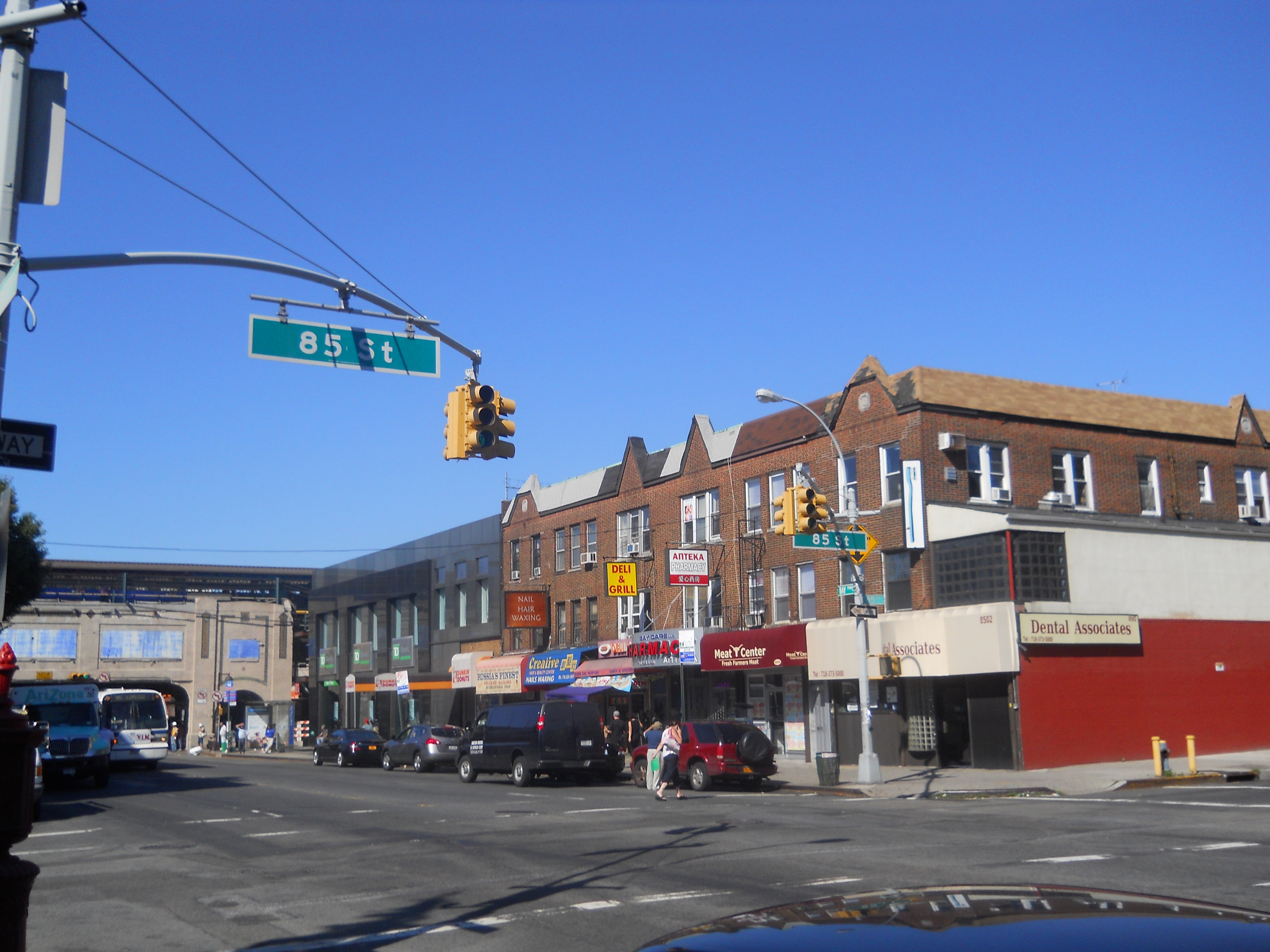
- Bay Parkway and 85th Street in Bensonhurst. Visible down the block is the Bay Parkway D Train Station on 86th Street.
- Interactive map of Bay Parkway
- Former name: 22nd Avenue
- Owner: City of New York
- Maintained by: NYCDOT
- Length: 2.7 mi (4.3 km)
- Location: Brooklyn, New York City
- Coordinates: 40°36′33.35″N 73°59′10.17″W
- South end: Dead end at Gravesend Bay
- Major junctions: Belt Parkway in Gravesend
- North end: Ocean Parkway in Midwood
- East: 23rd Avenue
- West: 22nd Avenue

Bay Parkway is a 2.7-mile-long (4.3 km) boulevard in the west portion of the New York City borough of Brooklyn.

== Route description ==
Bay Parkway begins at Ocean Parkway and continues for approximately 3 miles (4.8 km) southwesterly to Bath Beach, past Seth Low Playground and Bealin Square toward Bensonhurst Park, Shore Parkway (Exit 5), and Caesar's Bay shopping plaza on Gravesend Bay. It runs through Bensonhurst and is four lanes wide throughout its route. Along Bay Parkway are many Chinese, Russian and Italian-American businesses and many residential buildings and co-ops.

== History ==
Bay Parkway was known as 22nd Avenue until the 1930s, when the name was changed to facilitate large-scale apartment-type residential development. Its renaming as a parkway was first proposed in the state legislature in 1892, along with Bay Ridge Parkway, and Fort Hamilton Parkway, placing the road under the jurisdiction of the Brooklyn Parks Department. The renaming was intended to boost the desirability of real estate along its route.

On October 2, 2026, the intersection of Bay Parkway and 86th Street was co-named Canton Avenue to help celebrate the Chinese American community and its history.

== Transit ==
Bay Parkway has three New York City Subway stops:

- Bay Parkway on the BMT Sea Beach Line (N and W trains)
- Bay Parkway on the IND Culver Line (F and <F> trains)
- Bay Parkway on the BMT West End Line (D train)

The B6 also serves the parkway south of Avenue J, with service from Bensonhurst originating at Cropsey Avenue. It is joined with the B82 and B82+ Select Bus Service south of Kings Highway, all of which head south on Cropsey.
