= McDonald Avenue =

Avenue in Brooklyn, New York

- The intersection of Kings Highway and McDonald Avenue
- Interactive map of McDonald Avenue
- Former name: Gravesend Avenue
- Owner: City of New York
- Maintained by: NYCDOT
- Length: 4.5 mi (7.2 km)
- Location: Brooklyn, New York
- Coordinates: 40.62678592355408°N 73.97639911560688°W
- South end: 86th Avenue and Avenue X in Gravesend
- North end: 20th Street and 10th Avenue in Windsor Terrace

McDonald Avenue is a north-south street in Brooklyn, New York City. It runs through the neighborhoods of Windsor Terrace, Kensington, Mapleton, and Gravesend.

== Description ==
It passes near densely populated areas, cemeteries, and funeral homes, as well as a commercial corridor. In particular, the intersection with Bay Parkway is surrounded by cemeteries on three corners, including Washington Cemetery.

== History ==
On March 14, 1933, the Board of Aldermen (today's City Council) passed a resolution changing the name of Gravesend Avenue to McDonald Avenue, in honor of John R. McDonald (1871–1932), chief clerk of the Kings County Surrogate's Court. The proposal was promoted by the West Flatbush Civic League and local alderman Gustav Hartung following McDonald's death. This resolution received some opposition, as the Gravesend Chamber of Commerce believed that renaming Gravesend Avenue erased the historical connection to the town of Gravesend. The chamber further believed it was harmful to business.

== Transportation ==
The New York City Subway's IND Culver Line (F and <F> trains) serve most of its length.

The following bus routes serve McDonald Avenue:

- The B67 and B69 bus routes run between Cortelyou Road and either 20th Street (Downtown Brooklyn) or 10th Avenue (Kensington).
- Southbound from the northern intersection:
  - The BM1 and BM2 head east onto Caton Avenue.
  - The B103, BM3 and BM4 head east onto Church Avenue.
- The Sunset Park-bound B11 runs from Avenue I to Parkville Avenue.
