= BMT Brooklyn Loops =

Transit service in New York City

The Nassau Street Loop, also called the Nassau Loop, was a service pattern of the Brooklyn–Manhattan Transit Corporation (BMT) inaugurated in 1931 when the BMT Nassau Street Line was completed, providing a physical link that allowed a train to originate in Brooklyn, run through Lower Manhattan and return to Brooklyn without having to terminate and reverse the direction of the train. Nassau Loop services have not been able to operate since 1967, when the Loop line's connection to the Manhattan Bridge was severed.

The Centre Street Loop was a similar service proposal that was never completed. Together, they are referred to as the BMT Brooklyn Loops.

== Services ==
Trains using the Nassau Street Loop originated on the services to Coney Island and Bay Ridge. All the services merged at DeKalb Avenue station, and then split into four tracks over the Manhattan Bridge and two through the Montague Street Tunnel. Before the Nassau Street Line opened, the following service patterns were used:

- via bridge — from the Manhattan Bridge north tracks towards Midtown Manhattan
- via bridge — from the Manhattan Bridge south tracks to Chambers Street
- via tunnel — from the Montague Street Tunnel towards Midtown or turning short at City Hall

The Nassau Street Line was completed on May 30, 1931, and a fourth service pattern was added: the Nassau Street Loop. Trains could enter Manhattan along the south bridge tracks or through the tunnel and return via the other.

The Nassau Street Loop opened with two regular rush hour services, Monday– Saturday:

West End–Nassau Local	northbound	The West End Short Line local was rerouted from the BMT Broadway Line City Hall service
Culver–Nassau Express	southbound	This inaugurated Culver Line subway service

In 1934 two "Bankers' Specials" were added. Unlike the two existing regular services, these were special runs, one express service from the Brighton Line and another express from the Fourth Avenue Line. They operated during morning rush-hour only.

In 1950, Nassau Loop service reached its greatest extent when both Bankers' Specials added evening rush-hour service.

On May 28, 1959, in a massive round of service cuts known locally as the "May Massacre," Culver–Nassau service was eliminated entirely. The West End–Nassau trains ceased using the Manhattan Bridge part of the loop, turning at Chambers Street instead.

The Brighton and Fourth Avenue Bankers' Specials continued until the opening of the Chrystie Street Connection in 1967 with various permutations of routing but, by the time service ended, only the Fourth Avenue Bankers' Specials carried passengers over the Bridge. Brighton Bankers' trains operated northbound in the morning and southbound in the evening, using the bridge, but running "light" without passengers.

== Background ==
The Brooklyn Loops system, in its earliest incarnation, grew out of the desire of the New York and Brooklyn Bridge Company to make its cable railway more efficient by altering terminal facilities at the New York (Manhattan) end so that there would have been a modest downtown loop allowing trains to return to Brooklyn without reversing direction. This plan, proposed in 1888, five years after the bridge's opening, would also have included walking transfer facilities to future expected subway lines.

By 1891, municipal planning for roads, bridges and railways had advanced to the point that bills were proposed to build an elevated railway loop to connect the Brooklyn Bridge with the planned bridges that became known as the Williamsburg Bridge and Manhattan Bridge.

Consolidation of New York City with the City of Brooklyn and other suburbs in 1898 provided added political interest in a comprehensive way of dealing with the massive numbers of Brooklynites pouring into the overburdened Park Row elevated terminal and the anticipated crowds from future bridges. The Brooklyn Loops concept became an essential element of BRT planning for operation through downtown Manhattan by 1911, by that time planned as subway loops that would not only connect all three bridges, by then built, but an extension to the southern tip of Manhattan, returning to Brooklyn via a rail-only tunnel to be constructed.

There were to be two loop lines allowing BRT trains to enter lower Manhattan via one line, pass through Chambers Street, and return to Brooklyn via a different route, obviating the need for terminal facilities and lessening the necessity for turning trains in the Financial District.

The Nassau Street Loop was formed by tracks of the Montague Street Tunnel, BMT Nassau Street Line and Manhattan Bridge south tracks. The loop allowed trains from any BMT Southern Division subway line (service numbers 1 to 5) to operate northbound through DeKalb Avenue, take either the tunnel or the bridge, and then return southbound through DeKalb Avenue via the opposite route.

The other loop line, never finished, was the Centre Street Loop, formed by the Williamsburg Bridge, the Centre Street Line (now part of the BMT Nassau Street Line) and the Brooklyn Bridge. It would have allowed BMT Eastern Division trains to operate to or from Manhattan over the Broadway Elevated (now the BMT Jamaica Line) and return via any of the elevated lines splitting from the Brooklyn Bridge.

The Centre Street subway carried four tracks from a point just west of the former Essex Street terminal of the BMT Broadway (Brooklyn) Elevated to Canal Street, where the two center tracks terminated. Just south of that station, the Nassau Street Loop tracks entered from the bridge, providing four tracks again through Chambers Street. Just south of Chambers Street, the two center tracks end. Original plans called for the two west tracks, coming from the Jamaica Line, to rise onto the Brooklyn Bridge as part of the Centre Street Loop. The Nassau Street Line continues south as a two-track subway to the Montague Street Tunnel, where it merges with the BMT Broadway Line.

The Chrystie Street Connection opened in 1967, connecting the two north tracks on the Manhattan Bridge to the IND Sixth Avenue Line, and the south tracks to the northbound BMT Broadway Line. The connection to the BMT Nassau Street Line was cut off.
