= B74 =

B74 or B-74 may refer to:

- Bundesstraße 74, a German road
- B74 (New York City bus), in Brooklyn
- Sicilian Defense, Dragon Variation, according to the Encyclopaedia of Chess Openings
- Sutton Coldfield in the list of postal districts in the United Kingdom
- GER Class B74, a class of British steam locomotives
