= Coney Island–Stillwell Avenue station =

New York City Subway station in Brooklyn

Coney Island–Stillwell Avenue
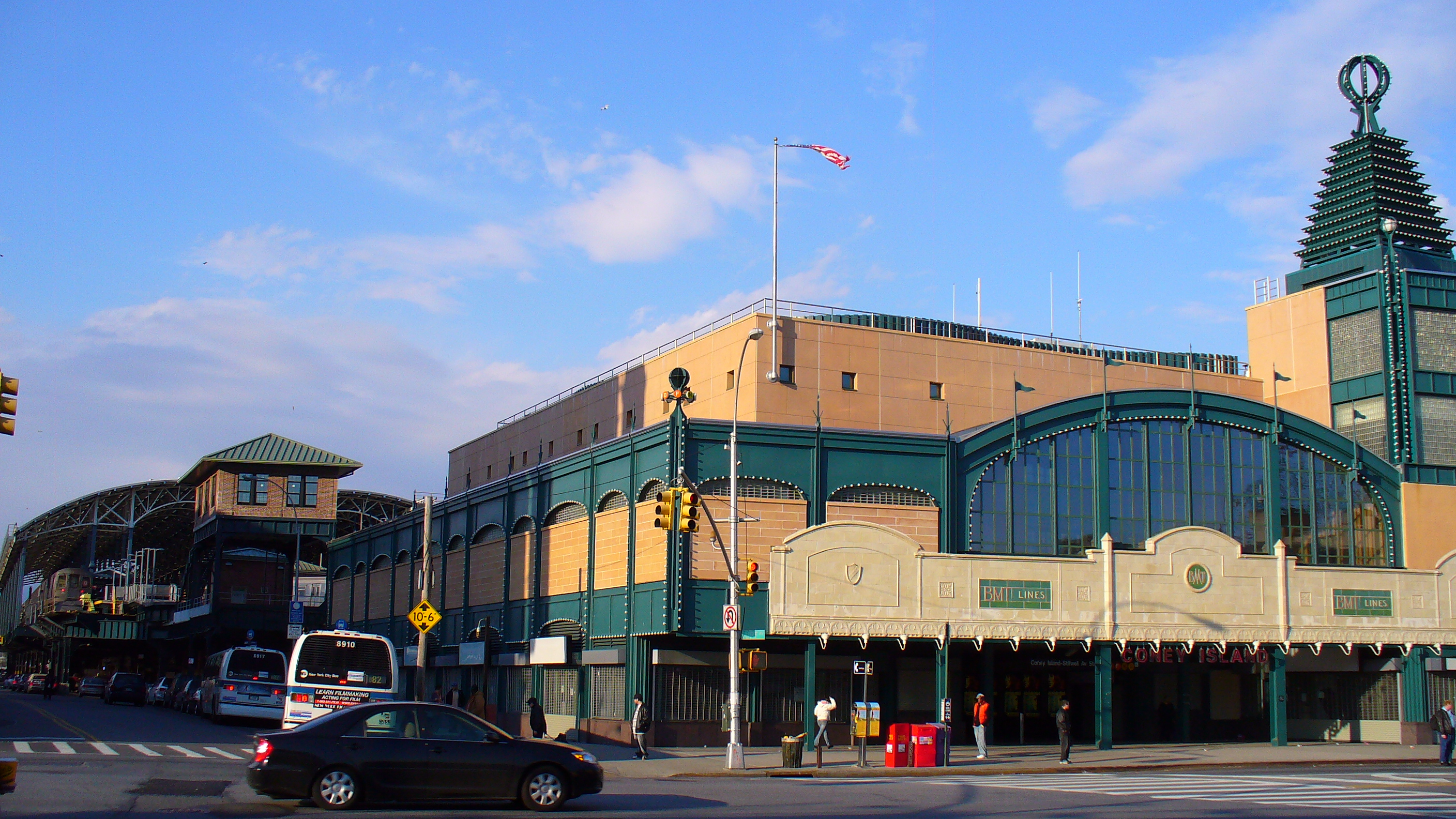
- Station building as seen from Surf Avenue

Station statistics
- Address: 1243 Surf Avenue (near Stillwell Avenue); Brooklyn, New York
- Borough: Brooklyn
- Locale: Coney Island
- Coordinates: 40°34′38″N 73°58′52″W
- Division: B (BMT/IND)
- Line: BMT Brighton Line; IND Culver Line; BMT Sea Beach Line; BMT West End Line; BMT Culver Line (formerly)
- Services: D (all times); F (all times) <F> (two rush hour trains, peak direction); N (all times); Q (all times)
- Transit: NYCT Bus: B36, B64, B68, B74, B82, X28, X38
- Structure: Elevated
- Platforms: 4 island platforms
- Tracks: 8

Other information
- Opened: September 5, 1917; 109 years ago (Sea Beach); December 23, 1918; 107 years ago (West End); May 29, 1919; 107 years ago (Brighton; formal opening); May 1, 1920; 106 years ago (Culver)
- Rebuilt: May 29, 2005; 21 years ago
- Accessible: Yes
- Former/other names: Coney Island Terminal; Coney Island; Stillwell Avenue; West End Terminal; Stillwell Terminal

Traffic
- 2025: 3,475,833 ▲6.9%
- Rank: 104 out of 423
Services
Preceding station	New York City Subway	Following station
West Eighth Street–New York Aquarium F <F> Q services split	Local	Terminus
86th Street N toward Astoria–Ditmars Boulevard	Local	Terminus
Bay 50th Street D toward Norwood–205th Street	Local	Terminus
Location
Location within New York City Subway
Location within New York City
Location within New York
Track layout
Street map
Station service legend
Symbol	Description
Stops all times	Stops all times
Stops rush hours in the peak direction only (limited service)	Stops rush hours in the peak direction only (limited service)
Stops weekdays and weekday late nights	Stops weekdays and weekday late nights

The Coney Island–Stillwell Avenue station (also known as Coney Island Terminal and signed on some trains as either Coney Island or Stillwell Avenue) is a terminal station of the New York City Subway in the Coney Island neighborhood of Brooklyn. It is the railroad-south terminus for the D, F, N, and Q trains at all times and for the <F> train during rush hours in the peak direction.

Coney Island–Stillwell Avenue is an elevated station with eight tracks and four island platforms; trains enter from both compass north and south. Opened in 1919–1920, the facility was designed at a time when Coney Island was the primary summer resort area for the New York metropolitan area, with all of the rail lines in southern Brooklyn funneling service to the area. The station has seen many service patterns throughout its history, and was completely renovated from 2001 to 2004.

The station is located at the corner of Stillwell and Surf Avenues in Coney Island, the site of the former West End Terminal. Geographically, the station is the southernmost terminal in the New York City Subway system. In addition, it is one of the largest elevated transportation terminals in the world. Below the tracks, there is a New York City Police Department (NYPD) transit precinct at the station.

== History ==
=== Origins ===
Rail transportation to Coney Island had been available since 1864. The Brooklyn, Bath and Coney Island Railroad was the first steam railroad to Coney Island. It ran from Fifth Avenue and 36th Street in what is now Sunset Park, to its West End Terminal, at the present-day Coney Island Terminal's location, along what is now the right-of-way of the West End Line. The nearby Culver Depot, along the Atlantic Ocean waterfront near the site of the present-day West Eighth Street station, served the Brooklyn, Flatbush, and Coney Island Railway (now the Brighton Line) and Prospect Park and Coney Island Railroad (now the Culver Line). Other rail transportation included The Manhattan Beach Railroad; The Sea Beach Railroad; The Coney Island and Brooklyn Railroad; a route to Long Island City via the Long Island Rail Road; and the Norton's Point Line trolley to what is now Sea Gate.

These railroads were not all connected to each other, resulting in a series of spur lines crossing the island. However, the Brighton, Culver, Sea Beach, and West End railroads were acquired by the Brooklyn Rapid Transit Company (BRT) by the late 1890s, and the Dual Contracts, signed in 1913, allowed many more subway lines to be built within New York City, which had been incorporated fifteen years prior.

=== New West End Terminal ===
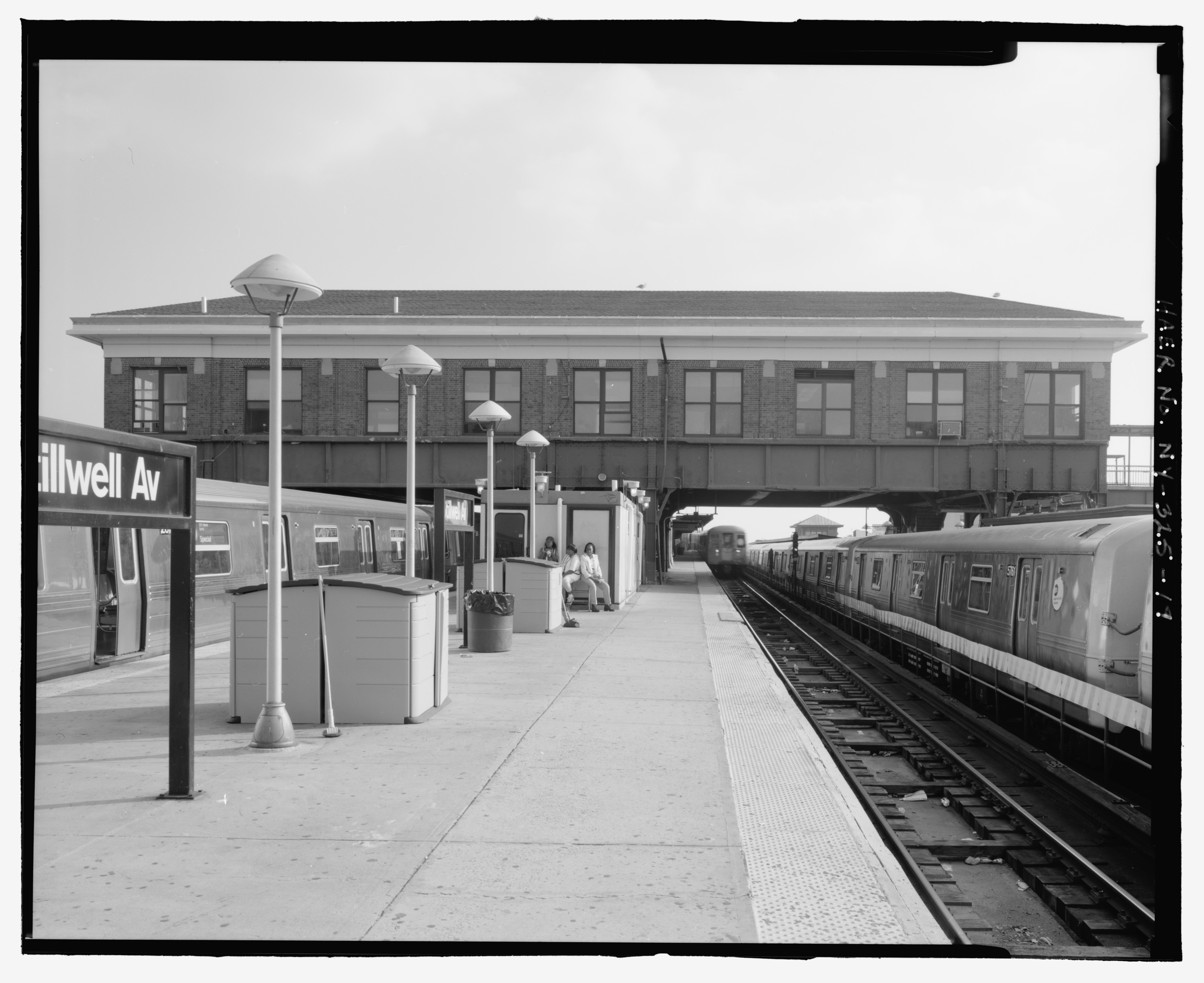
The station platform before its 2000s renovation

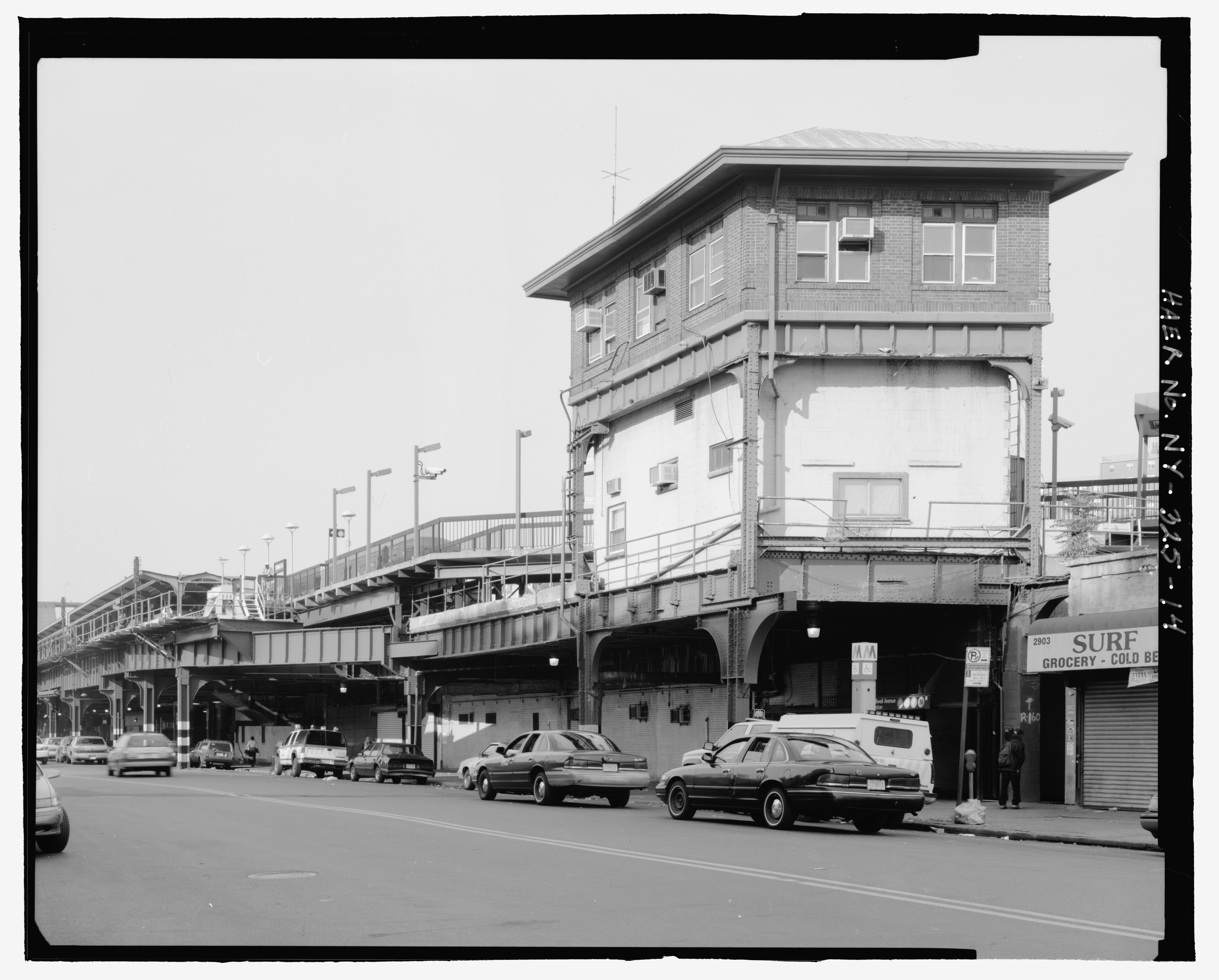
Northeast view of the signal tower at the southern end of the station, as seen from Stillwell Avenue near Surf Avenue

In the late 1910s, a completely reconstructed New West End Terminal station (which gradually became better known as Coney Island Terminal station) was built on an elevated structure. The new terminal unified the terminals of most of the former steam railroad lines terminating at Coney Island, aside from the Long Island Rail Road-controlled New York and Manhattan Beach Railway. This new terminal could accommodate hundreds of thousands of passengers a day. This project entailed rerouting the Brighton and Culver Lines from a ground-level alignment to an elevated structure with eight tracks and four platforms.

The BRT-operated Sea Beach Line, which served the terminal, opened on September 5, 1917, and the BRT West End Line had been similarly inaugurated on December 23, 1918. The terminal officially opened on May 29, 1919, when the new Brighton Line opened. With the opening of the Culver Line on May 1, 1920, the terminal was finally completed.

As a result of the Culver Line extension, the BRT's double fare to Coney Island expired, and was cut from 10 cents to 5 cents, and Coney Island became a more affordable vacation area compared to in previous years. In 1923, these lines came under the control of the Brooklyn–Manhattan Transit Corporation (BMT), the BRT's successor company. Riders at the new station were promised trains that ran every three minutes during rush hours, but this quickly proved not to be true. In 1923, a reporter for the Brooklyn Standard Union observed that rush hour trains had headways of eight minutes on the Sea Beach Line and fifteen minutes on the West End Line, and that no direct Manhattan service was being run on either the Brighton or Culver Lines during rush hours.

In 1929, the BMT announced a new entrance for the station. This new entrance would have retail space that would be "periodically inspected." In June 1933, a new Brighton–Franklin weekday service was announced. This service would operate express (except in evening rush hours) providing a direct route from Franklin Avenue to Coney Island. Culver elevated trains would operate to either Sands Street or Park Row depending on the time of day.

There was a transfer from the Coney Island Terminal to the Norton's Point Trolley to Sea Gate, via an elevated footbridge across Stillwell Avenue to the elevated trolley station. In 1948, the trolley was discontinued and replaced with the B74 Mermaid Avenue Bus, The trolley ramp spanning Stillwell Avenue and West 15th Street was torn down around this time.

Matters became more complicated in 1954, when the Independent Subway System (IND) started operating D trains on the Culver Line. At the time, the tracks had lettered names (i.e. Track A, Track B, all the way to Track H from east to west). However, the IND also used lettered designations for its routes (i.e. A, B, all the way to H as well). The BMT had used numbered route designations up to this point, so this had not been a problem. However, the D route was now using the Culver Line, which departed from tracks E and F. To avoid confusion, the tracks were given numbered designations.

In 1956, residents of Coney Island protested against paying a transfer to the bus on Mermaid Avenue (now the B74 bus to Sea Gate), with some saying that the 15-cent fee for transferring should be abolished because the bus was essentially an adjunct to the station. In 1979, the City Planning Commission proposed something similar, in that Coney Island residents would get a free transfer between the B36/B74 bus routes and the subway station. It was noted that the station was the only one that did not get a free bus transfer after the corresponding subway transfer was discontinued (in sharp contrast to the BMT Culver Line, BMT Myrtle Avenue Line, and IRT Third Avenue Line, which were discontinued but replaced by bus transfers). The free transfers would allow a $200 million apartment complex nearby, funded by the government, to get more residents to move in, as well as diversify Mark Twain Junior High School and attract a stable middle class. The experimental free transfer was instituted in November 1980, following three years of continuous advocacy by a Coney Island tenants' group. At the time, subway and bus fares were separate and cost a combined $1.20. The first phase of the program allowed riders to transfer for free, paying a 60-cent combined fare, while the second phase allowed for a half-price transfer, with the combined fare being 90 cents. Schedules showing trains' departure times were installed at the Coney Island Terminal in 1965.

=== Station renovation ===
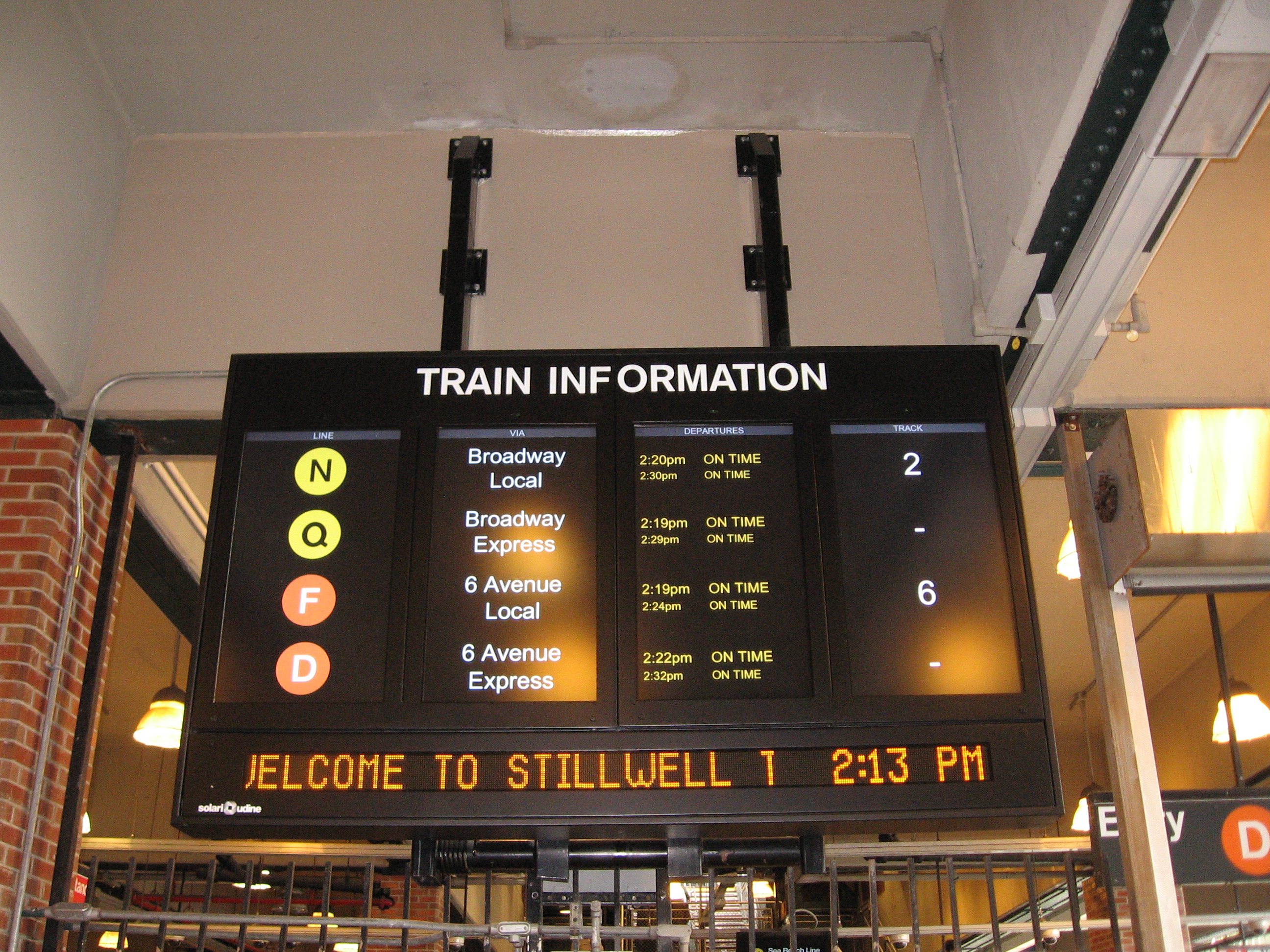
Main Departure Board

Once a grand hub, the Coney Island Terminal had started deteriorating by the 1960s. By 1980, the entire system was in a state of disrepair, and the terminal was no exception. It was slated to be rebuilt that year. According to the New York Daily News, the renovated station would get "a bright, new airy look" as well as one of the system's first installations of continuously welded rail. The steel and concrete station was badly corroded by the effects of salt water and poor maintenance. In 1983, the MTA added funding for a renovation of the Stillwell Avenue station to its 1980–1984 capital plan. The New York Times wrote in 2008: "The old station was a gaping masterpiece of stalactited decrepitude [...] nicely mirroring the seedy ambience of the Coney Island Boardwalk."

==== Initial renovation attempts ====
Plans to renovate the Coney Island–Stillwell Avenue station were brought up again in the late 1980s, after restaurant mogul Horace Bullard proposed rebuilding the nearby Steeplechase Park. The Steeplechase Park reconstruction was later canceled. Nonetheless, plans for the station renovation moved forward, and the Metropolitan Transportation Authority (MTA) indicated in 1988 that it would spend $30,000 to study what to do with the station building. At the time, The Washington Post characterized the shops around the entrance as being arranged around a dark alley that smelled like urine; according to the Post, it had been 15 years since the station had been repainted. By the mid-1990s, the MTA had finalized plans to overhaul the station completely.

On December 23, 1992, a contract was awarded for $21.14 million to rehabilitate the viaduct at the station. As part of the project, the concrete on columns and beams were to be removed and replaced. Once work started on the project, the contractor discovered that the extent of the concrete deterioration was greater than expected. Work on the change proceeded on April 1, 1994, and additional workers, including asbestos and lead abatement, were retroactively approved on May 23, 1994. By late 1998, the MTA was planning to renovate the station for $200 million. The MTA requested $125 million in federal funding for the renovation the next year. As part of renovation, a group of satellite dishes was proposed for the station. By this point, the New York City Transit Police were operating from a tent adjacent to the station, and there were vestiges of a carousel within the station.

==== 2000s renovation ====
The MTA began evicting existing tenants from the station house in early 2001, including Philip's Candy, a candy store that had operated in the station building for seven decades. Despite the economic effects of the September 11 attacks in 2001, the MTA awarded a $282 million construction contract the next month. A full reconstruction started on November 5, 2001 with the closure of the Sea Beach platform, which was used by the N train. The Culver and Brighton Line platforms, hosting the F and Q services respectively, were closed on September 8, 2002, as was the adjacent West Eighth Street–New York Aquarium station. At the time, the Coney Island Chamber of Commerce estimated that 75 percent of tourists to Coney Island traveled there via one of the two subway stations.

The project included restoring the BMT station building's facade and adding a roof with solar panels. To minimize impact on the surrounding community, the renovation was supposed to take 42 months, and the West End Line continued serving the station through the renovation. One platform at a time remained open during construction so the West End services (the W until February 22, 2004 and the D afterward) could keep serving the station. Although local officials supported the renovation, they worried that the closure of three platforms would negatively impact local businesses. During the 2003 season, merchants in Coney Island reported that their business had declined significantly because of the station's partial closure.

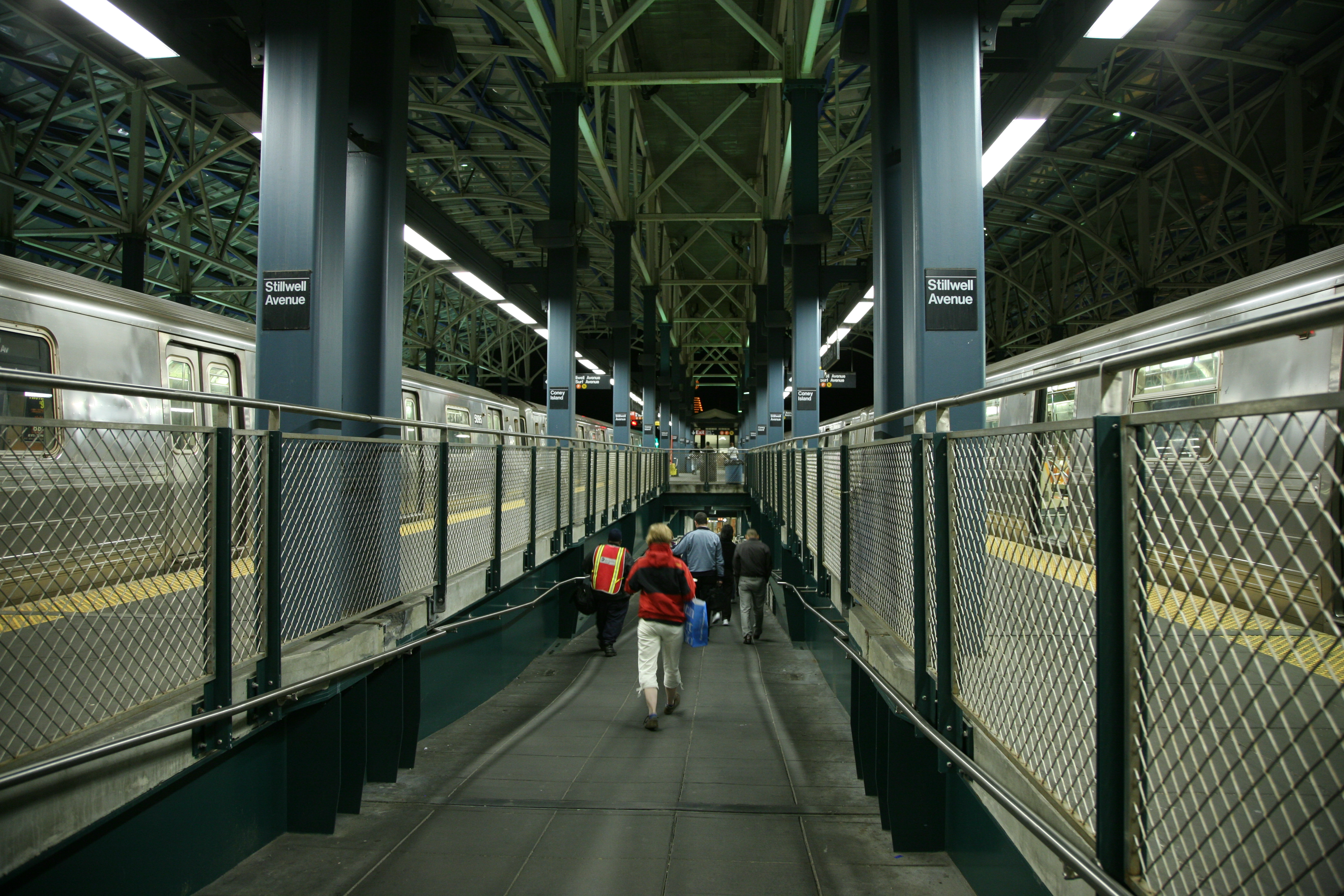
Ramp from mezzanine to platform

The new terminal opened on May 23, 2004, with the restoration of F and Q service and the relocation of D service to tracks 1 and 2. The New York Times called the refurbished station house "one of the grandest subway stations in the city" and wrote that the station house would give Surf Avenue "a much needed face-lift". The project was completed on May 29, 2005, with full restoration of N service. The final cost of the renovation is variously cited as $240 million, $260 million, $294 million, or $300 million. Although the station had been made fully wheelchair-accessible during the renovation, the Daily News reported in 2007 that the elevators were often in disrepair and that passengers had to take two elevators to reach their platforms.

=== 2010s to present ===
In May 2010, the station received four new electronic 32-inch (81 cm) train departure boards for each platform. These boards are controlled by dispatchers, based on the departure times posted on subway timetables. In the aftermath of Hurricane Sandy in 2012, the station house was flooded, and some electrical equipment was damaged. Luna Park operator Central Amusement International agreed to lease nine storefronts at the station in 2019, covering 7,000 square feet (650 m^{2}). The spaces would have housed a restaurant, visitor center, and other tourism-themed businesses. These stores were supposed to have opened in 2020, but all attractions on Coney Island were closed during that year due to the COVID-19 pandemic in New York City.

The MTA announced in late 2022 that it would open customer service centers at 15 stations; the centers would provide services such as travel information and OMNY farecards. The first six customer service centers, including one at the Coney Island–Stillwell Avenue station, were to open in early 2023. The Coney Island–Stillwell Avenue station's customer service center opened in February 2023. The MTA also announced plans in 2023 to add bicycle parking racks at the Stillwell Avenue station. In October 2026, the MTA announced plans to install taller fare gates with glass panels at 20 additional stations, including the Coney Island–Stillwell Avenue station, following a successful pilot program at earlier stations.

On December 22, 2024, a woman was immolated on an F train that was stopped at the station; an undocumented immigrant was later charged with her murder.

== Station layout ==
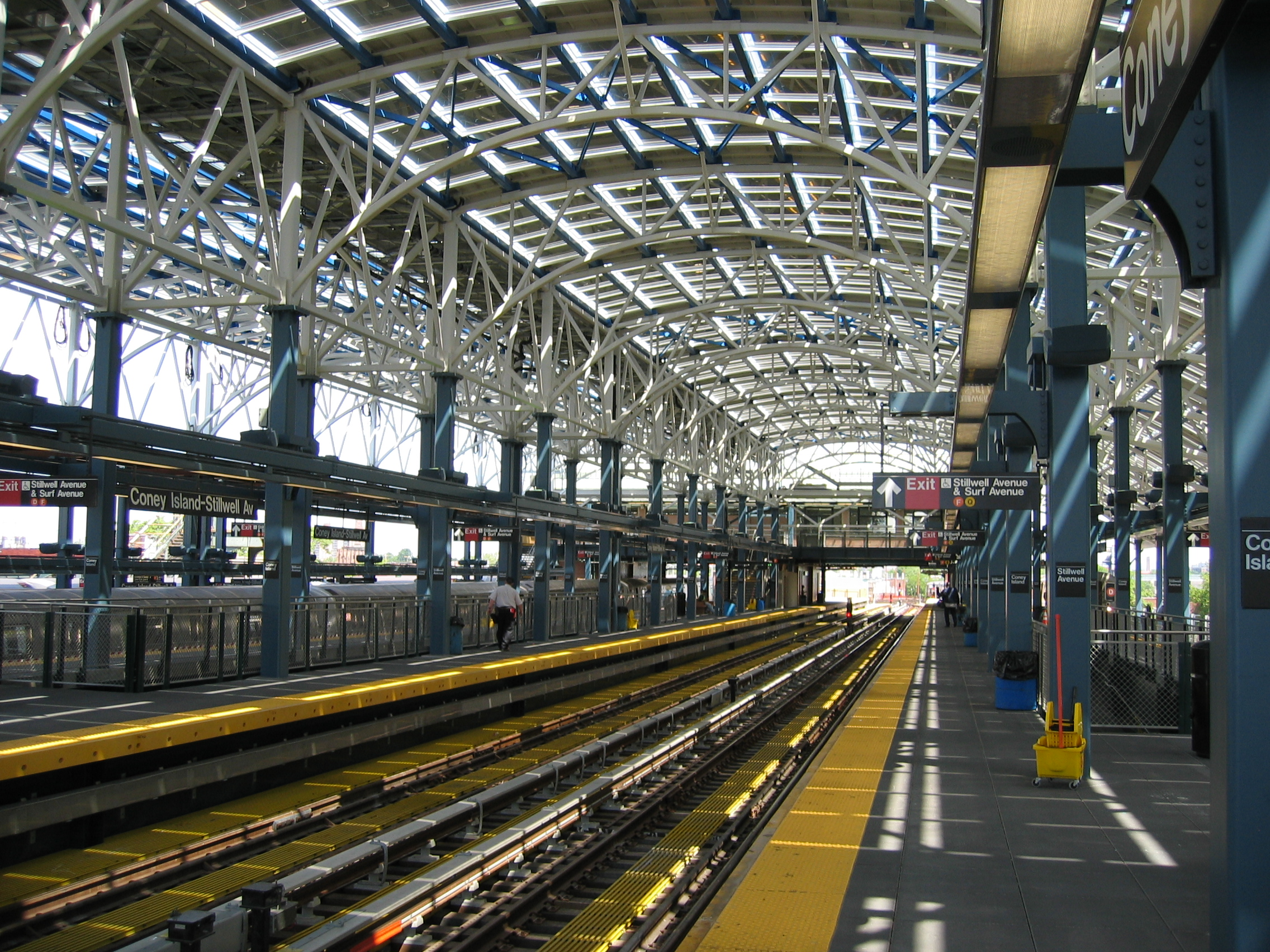
Platform view of the platforms serving eastern tracks 1–4

The station has eight tracks and four island platforms. According to the New York City Transit Authority, this makes it one of the world's largest elevated transportation terminals. The westernmost tracks, tracks 5–8, gradually slope downward, so tracks 1–4 are slightly higher than tracks 5–8 at the station's south end. There are ADA-compliant ramps from the three easternmost platforms (served by the F and <F> trains, the Q train, and the N train, respectively) to the main station building below the platforms; a non-ADA-compliant ramp leads from the D train's (western) platform, with steps. ADA access to the D train's platform is provided by an elevator at the north end of that platform. The elevator leads to an overpass that connects to another ADA-compliant elevator at the northern end of the N train's platform. There are also stairways down to the station building. The station has train crew facilities at its north end. North of the station, tracks 1–2 and 7–8 lower to run at-grade adjacent to the yard.

Nearly everything in the current station dates to the 2000s renovation; a brick signal tower is all that remains of the old station. The southern two-thirds of the station is under the solar-panel-covered roof, while the northern third of the station is in the open air, not covered by anything. The shed is lit up by platform floodlights during the night hours. The solar-paneled roof was designed by Kiss and Cathcart Architects and the new station's structural engineering was designed by Jacobs Engineering Group. Both the roof and the station itself were built by a joint venture between Granite Halmar Construction and Schiavone Construction. The new station recycled 85 percent of the materials from the old station, and 2 million pounds (910,000 kg) of steel was salvaged from the old station for use in the new terminal. In total, the terminal uses about 6,500 short tons (5,800 long tons; 5,900 t) of steel.

As part of the MTA Arts & Design program, an artwork by Robert Wilson, My Coney Island Baby, was installed in 2004. The artwork consists of glass bricks measuring 8 by 8 inches (200 by 200 mm) across and 1.5 inches (38 mm) thick, which in turn form a wall measuring 17 feet (5.2 m) tall. The wall contains silk screen prints that feature beach-related scenes, especially scenes related to Coney Island's history. The width of the wall is variously described as 300 feet (91 m) or 370 feet (110 m). In conjunction with the installation of My Coney Island Baby, Wilson created a set of drawings, which were displayed in a 2005 exhibit by Coney Island USA.

=== Station house ===
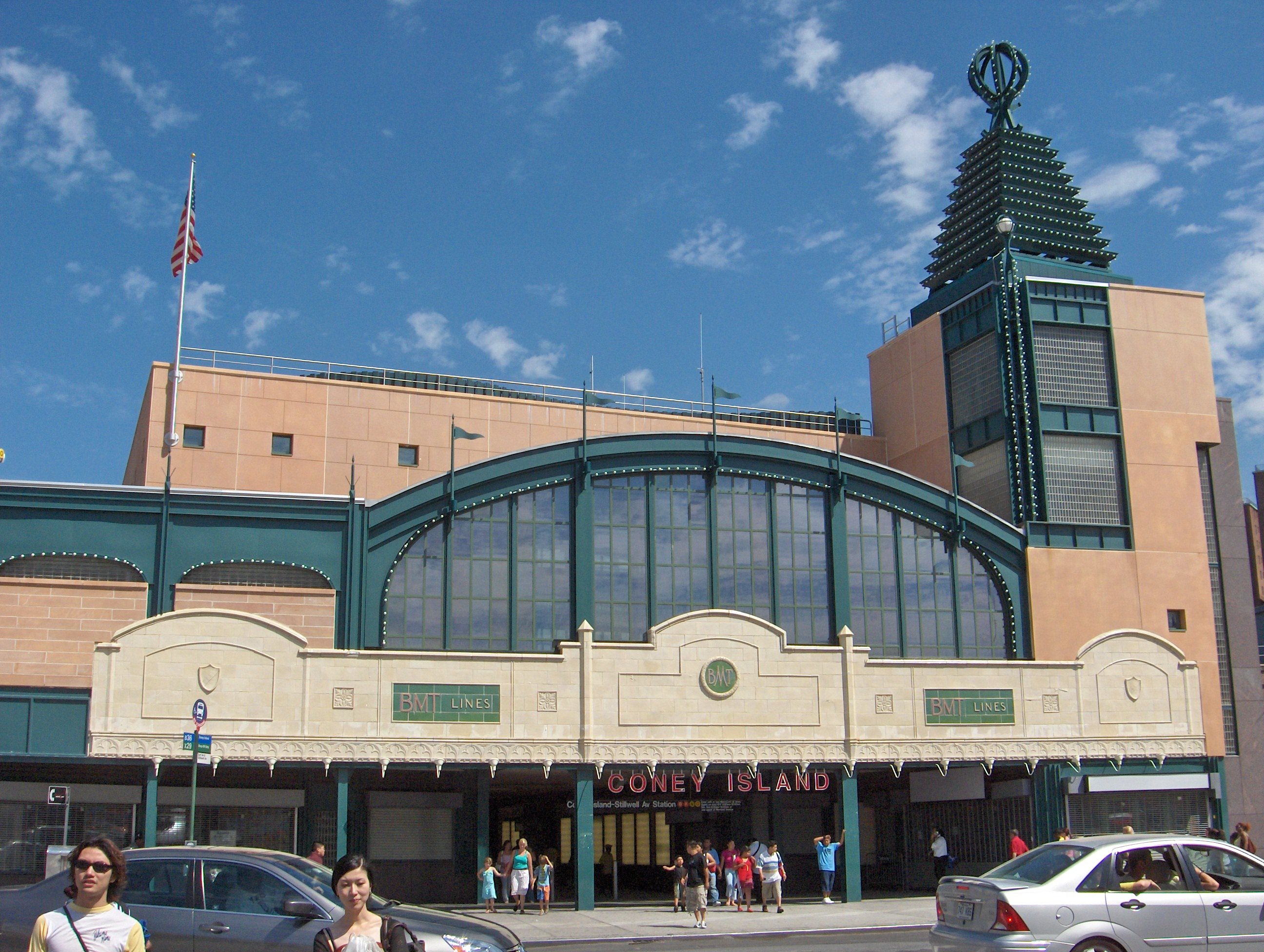
Main entrance through station house

The station house, called the Portal Building, was designed by di Domenico + Partners and built by Vertex Engineering Services. The three-floor, 34,000-square-foot (3,200 m^{2}) Portal Building, located at 1243 Surf Avenue, has a terracotta facade in imitation of the former terminal, including restored BMT signs and logos, and a parapet salvaged from the original station house. The original station house had about 580 terracotta tiles, as well as green medallions with the initials "BMT"; these had been covered with billboards during the late 20th century before being restored in the 2000s. The modern station building's design is supposed to evoke the area's amusement park-based history, with small lights hanging from the narrow, articulated tower that rises next to the station entrance. There are also art deco lamps and a semicircular window that fills an arch above the station entrance.

The Portal Building's main entrance is on Surf Avenue past the station's south end. From this entrance, there is a police precinct (Transit District 34 of the New York City Police Department, or NYPD), retail space, and the station's fare control area. There is also another entrance/exit to the bus shelter on Mermaid Avenue. The retail space and the new station entrance were built during the 2001–2005 renovation. There is also a side entrance from Stillwell Avenue itself.

There are also High Entry-Exit Turnstiles that allow entry to the station during late night hours, when the station booth is closed.

=== Solar panels ===
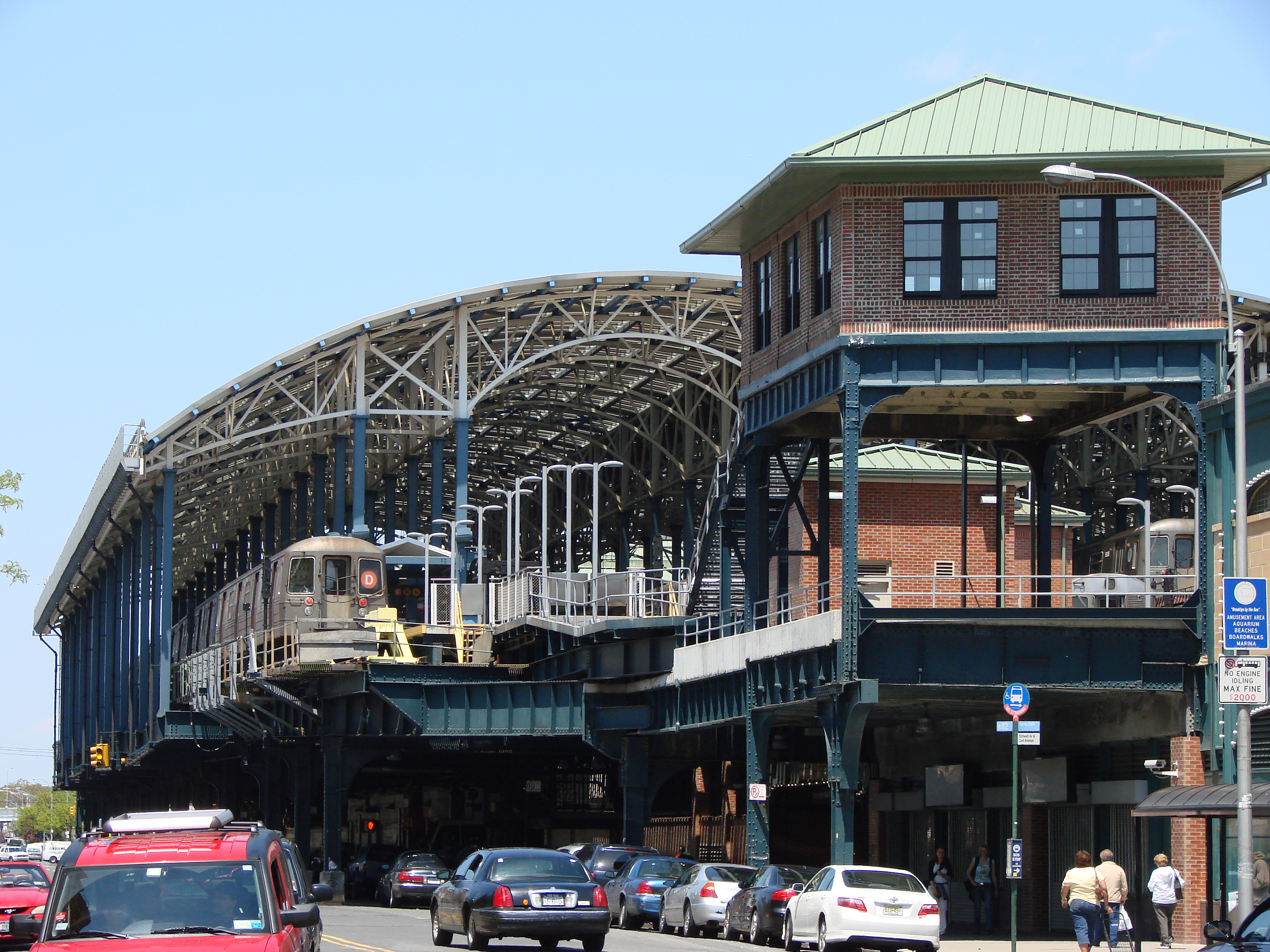
D train terminating at Coney Island–Stillwell Avenue

The new station's infrastructure includes a soaring roof with arches reminiscent of grand European railway stations such as the Gare Saint-Lazare and the Paddington railway station. The roof is glazed with photovoltaic (solar electric) panels, consisting of 2,730 thin-film modules from Schott AG, which cover about 76,000 square feet (7,100 m^{2}). The solar panel system has a nominal capacity of about 210 kWp; this equates to an annual output of 250,000 kWh. The solar panels provide about 15 percent of the station's power. Although the solar roof cost about $4 million more than a glass roof of the same size, the MTA believed that the panels would save money in the long run.

Due to their location near the beachfront, the station roof's solar panels needed to meet stringent hurricane standards. To meet those standards, the panels for the station were rigorously tested in a laboratory in York, Pennsylvania. This makes Stillwell Avenue the first solar-powered subway station in the New York City Subway system. The solar panels were expected to last for at least 35 years, and a catwalk is located below the roof if any solar panel replacements were ever needed. As a bonus feature, a low voltage current, which is emitted from the panels, serves as a deterrent against pigeons.

At the time of the panels' installation, Con Edison did not generally allow solar systems to be designed to feed energy back into its grid. As a result, output never exceeds demand, and much of the power produced on sunny days is wasted.

=== Services and tracks ===
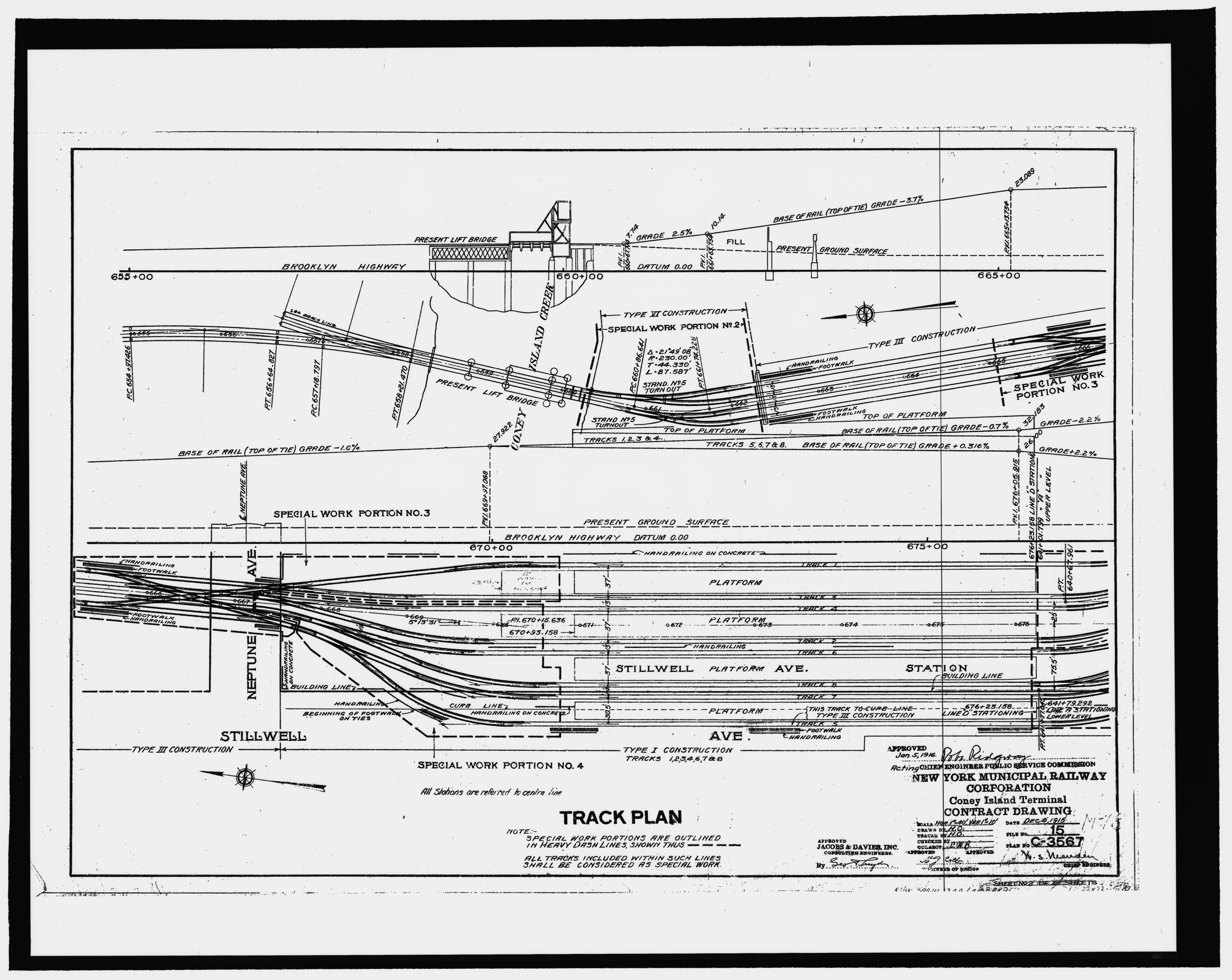
Track plan as proposed in 1915, showing all tracks as through tracks. This image is oriented 90 degrees clockwise from north, so that the image shows the eastward view of the track plan

Bay 50th Street (BMT West End Line)		86th Street (BMT Sea Beach Line)	
North of the station
BMT West End Line; Local: D (all times); Express: no regular service		BMT Sea Beach Line; Local: N (all times); Express: no regular service	
In the station
tracks 7 and 8 D (all times)	tracks 5 and 6 F (all times) <F> (two rush hour trains, peak direction)	tracks 3 and 4 Q (all times)	tracks 1 and 2 N (all times)
East of the station
lower level		upper level	
IND Culver Line; Local: F (all times) <F> (two rush hour trains, peak direction); Express: no regular service		BMT Brighton Line; Local: Q (all times); Express: no regular service	
West Eighth Street–New York Aquarium (IND Culver/BMT Brighton Lines)

Each line has its own pair of tracks and a pair of double switches between these tracks, and each service has its own island platform serving these tracks. In regular operation, no service needs to cross over the tracks of another service. The tracks are numbered sequentially from east to west, with the N train at tracks 1 and 2; the Q at tracks 3 and 4; the F at tracks 5 and 6; and the D at tracks 7 and 8. Tracks 1–6 can serve trains coming from both the north and south, while tracks 7–8 can only serve trains from the north, since they terminate at bumper blocks at the station's south end. Until 1954, track 2 ended at a bumper block to the south, while track 7 merged with track 6 at the south end of the station. The next stations to the north are Bay 50th Street for D trains, 86th Street for N trains, and West Eighth Street–New York Aquarium for F, <F>, and Q trains.

Though designed as a through station, service has rarely been provided between tracks. Aside from service changes, only two services have been scheduled to run through the station. These brief services ran as follows:

- 7 Brighton–Franklin service, via the BMT Franklin Avenue Line and BMT Brighton Line, through Stillwell Avenue to Manhattan (summer Sundays 1924–1952)
- NX Sea Beach "super-express" service (rush hours 1967–1968)

North of the station, tracks 7 and 6 merge into one track (with a switch from track 7 to track 8), tracks 5 through 2 merge into another track, and tracks 1 and 8 stay separate, so that there is a four-tracked structure when the BMT West End Line and BMT Sea Beach Line cross the Coney Island Creek. Before the structure crosses the creek, all four tracks have switches that connect the tracks to each other, before the West End and Sea Beach Lines split. Tracks from these lines then lead into Coney Island Yard. South of the station, tracks 4, 5, and 6 stay separate from the other tracks (with a pair of switches between tracks 5 and 6) and tracks 1, 2, and 3 merge and have a diamond crossover with track 4. Tracks 3 and 4 (the Brighton Line tracks) are above tracks 5 and 6 (the Culver Line tracks) at this point.

== Bus terminal ==
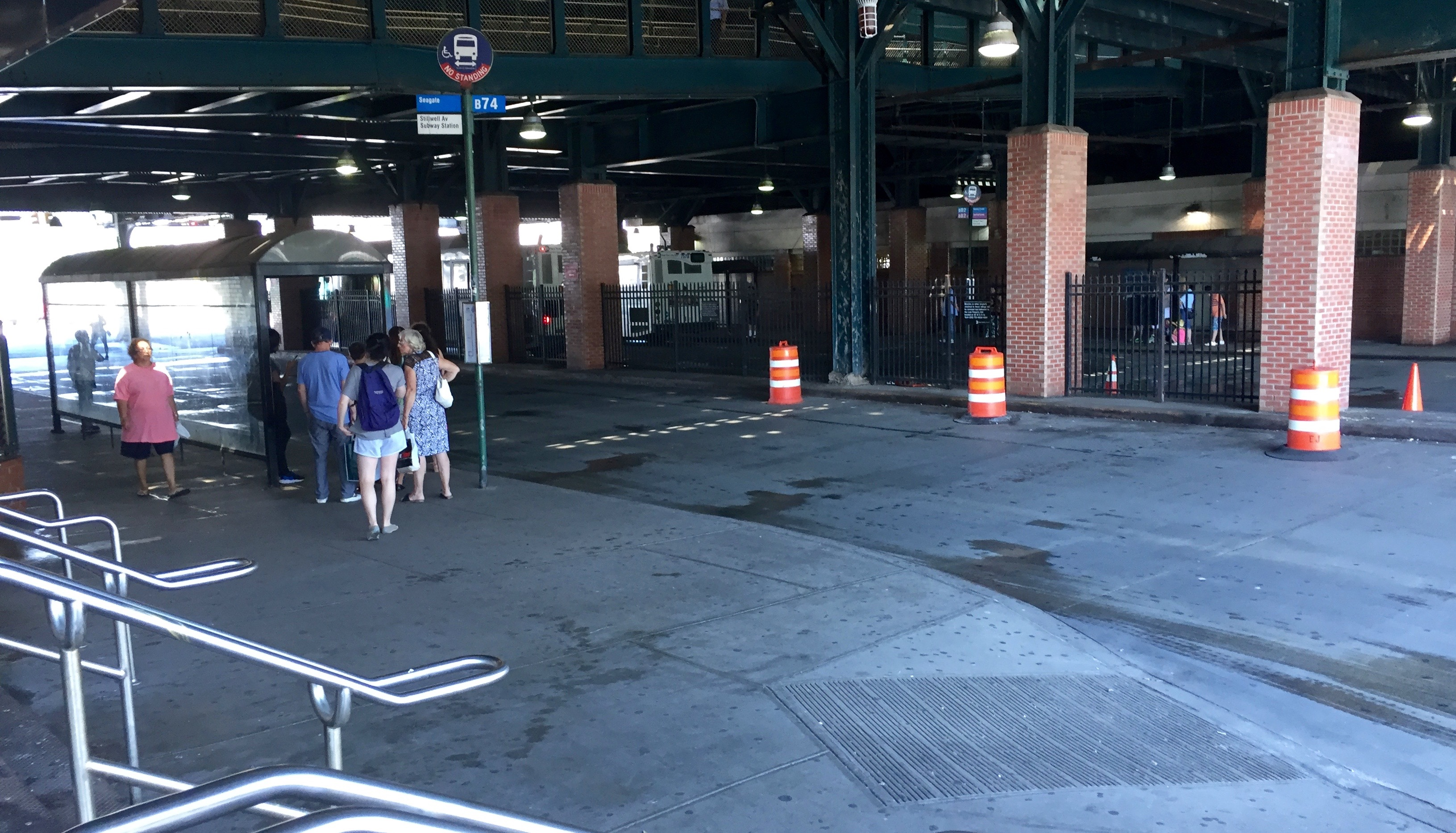
The bus stop underneath the station

Located underneath the subway station terminal is a set of bus stops that loop on Stillwell Avenue and Mermaid Avenue that make up a bus terminal for four New York City Bus lines. The bus terminal provides easier transfer to the subway and bus connections. One additional bus line is located near the station complex.

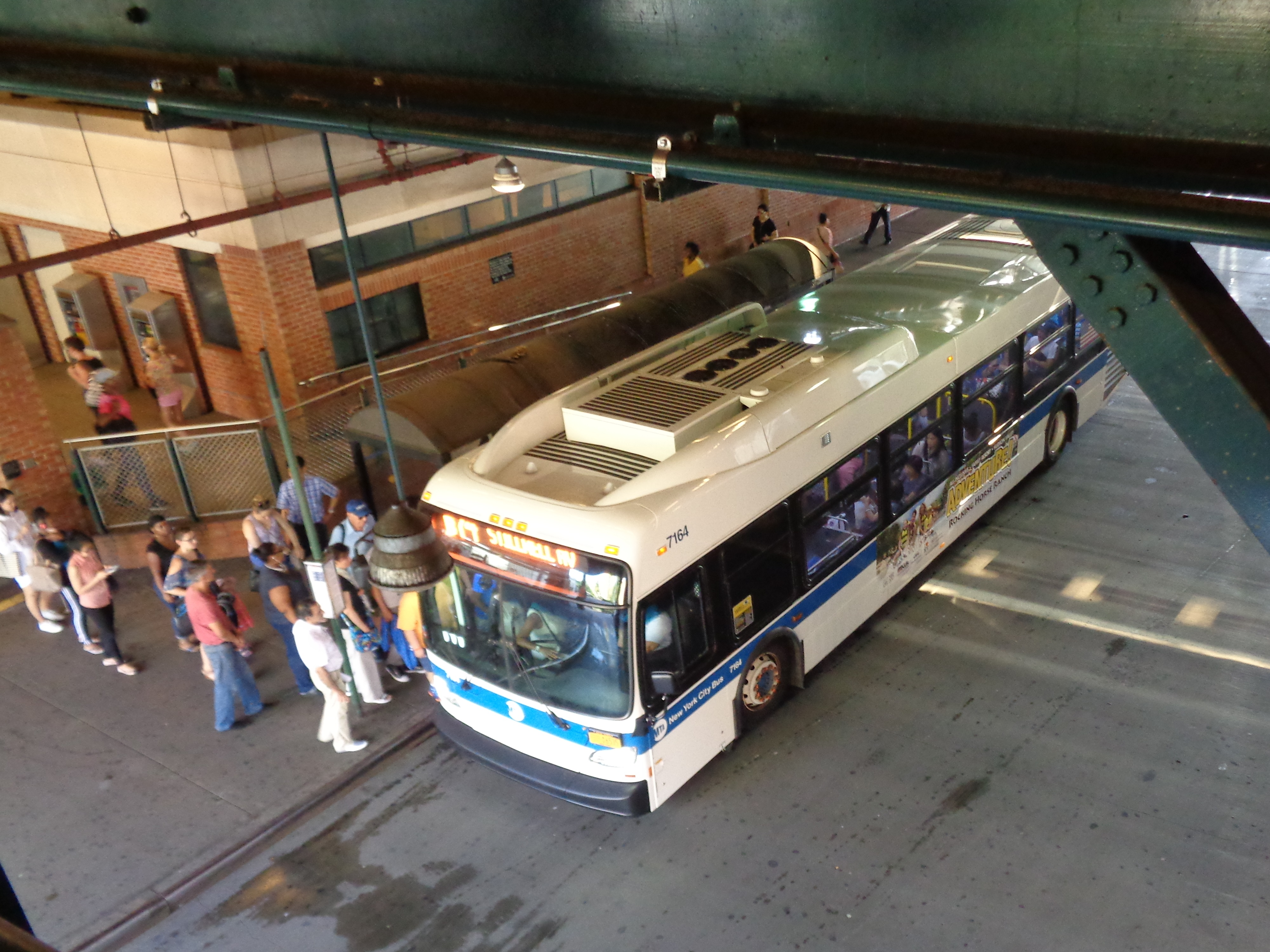
A bus departing from the station loop

Lane	Route	Terminus
North side opposite station entrance	B68	Windsor Terrace; Bartel Pritchard Square
North side opposite station entrance	B82 Local	Starrett City; Pennsylvania Avenue and Seaview Avenue
Station entrance	B74	Sea Gate; West 37th Street and Mermaid Avenue
Station entrance	B64, B68, B74, B82	Coney Island–Stillwell Avenue; Terminating buses; drop-off only
Stillwell Avenue and Mermaid Avenue (Western side)	B64	Bay Ridge; Shore Road and 71st Street
Stillwell Avenue and Surf Avenue	B36	Westbound: Sea Gate; West 37th Street and Surf Avenue
Stillwell Avenue and Surf Avenue	B36	Eastbound: Sheepshead Bay; Avenue U and Nostrand Avenue

=== Subway–bus transfer coordination ===
To reduce missed connections and waiting time between the B36 and B82 buses and the Q train, New York City Transit began operating yellow holding lights to signal bus operators to wait for imminently arriving trains. The lights, which began operating March 10, 2014, are on the northeast corner of Surf and Stillwell Avenues and in the Mermaid Avenue Bus Loop. This system operates during late nights, from 11:00 p.m. to 5:00 a.m. daily.

== Nearby points of interest ==
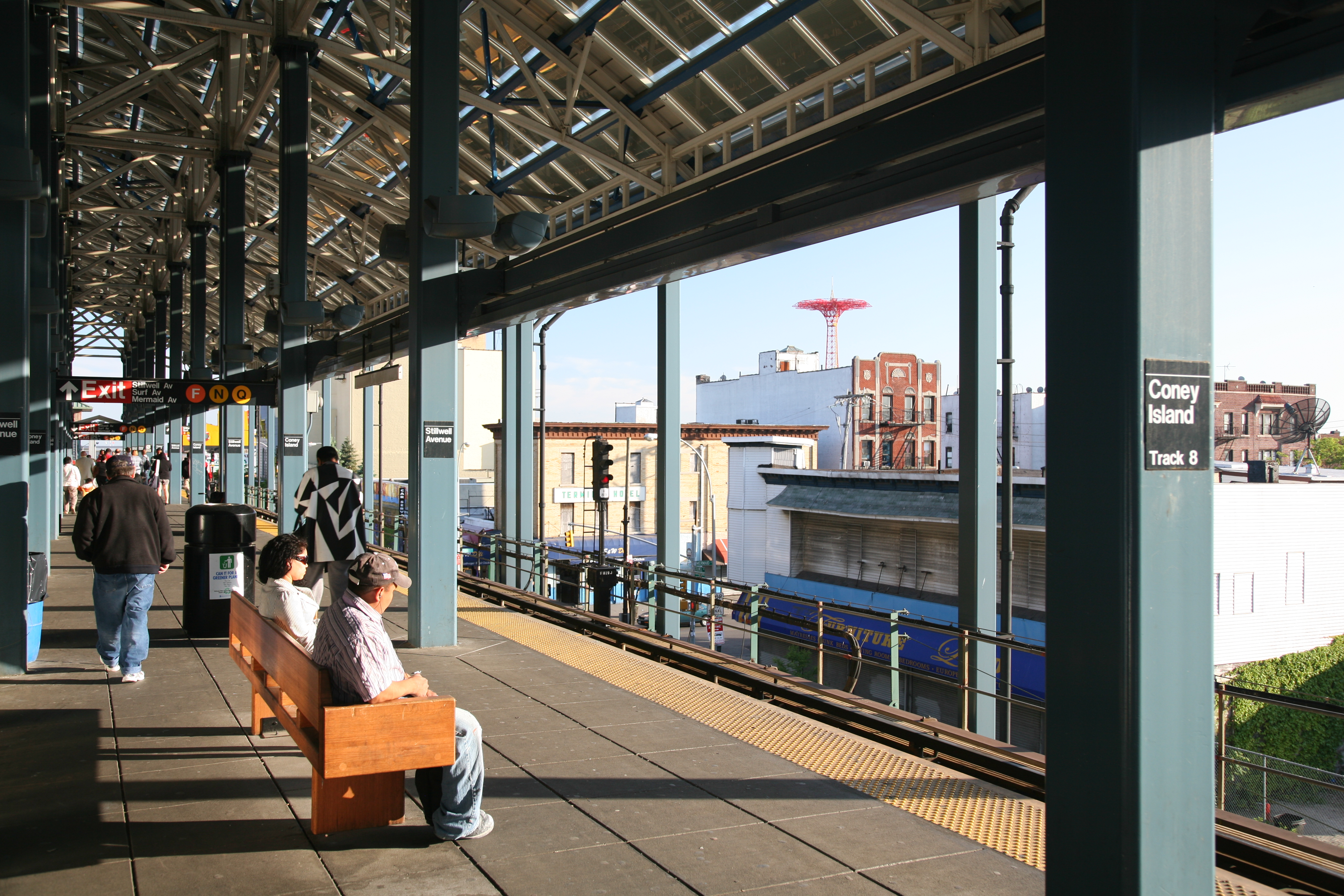
Track 8 platform with the Parachute Jump in the background

The station is located across Surf Avenue from the Coney Island amusement area. It is close to the Luna Park amusement park, formerly the site of Astroland; the Scream Zone area, operated by Luna Park; Deno's Wonder Wheel Amusement Park; the Cyclone and Thunderbolt roller coasters; and the amusement area on the site of Steeplechase Park, which includes the B&B Carousell. Other nearby attractions include the original Nathan's Famous store and the Riegelmann Boardwalk along the Atlantic Ocean. The New York Aquarium is a few blocks to the east, though the West Eighth Street–New York Aquarium station is closer to the aquarium than the Stillwell Avenue station is.

Slightly to the west is Maimonides Park, home park of the Brooklyn Cyclones, a minor league baseball team. The nearby area also has assorted amusement park attractions, such as bumper cars, carousels, and ice skating rinks, especially along Surf Avenue. The Parachute Jump, a former parachute-drop ride later converted into a lighted tower, is nearby and visible from the station. In addition, the seasonal Coney Island Mermaid Parade is held every summer near the station. The Nathan's Hot Dog Eating Contest, held on July 4 each year, also takes place at the Nathan's shop, diagonally across the intersection of Surf and Stillwell Avenues on the southwest corner. The former Shore Theater is located on the northwest corner of that intersection, west of the station and north of Nathan's Famous.
