= B68 (New York City bus) =

Bus route in Brooklyn, New York

b68
- Coney Island Avenue Line
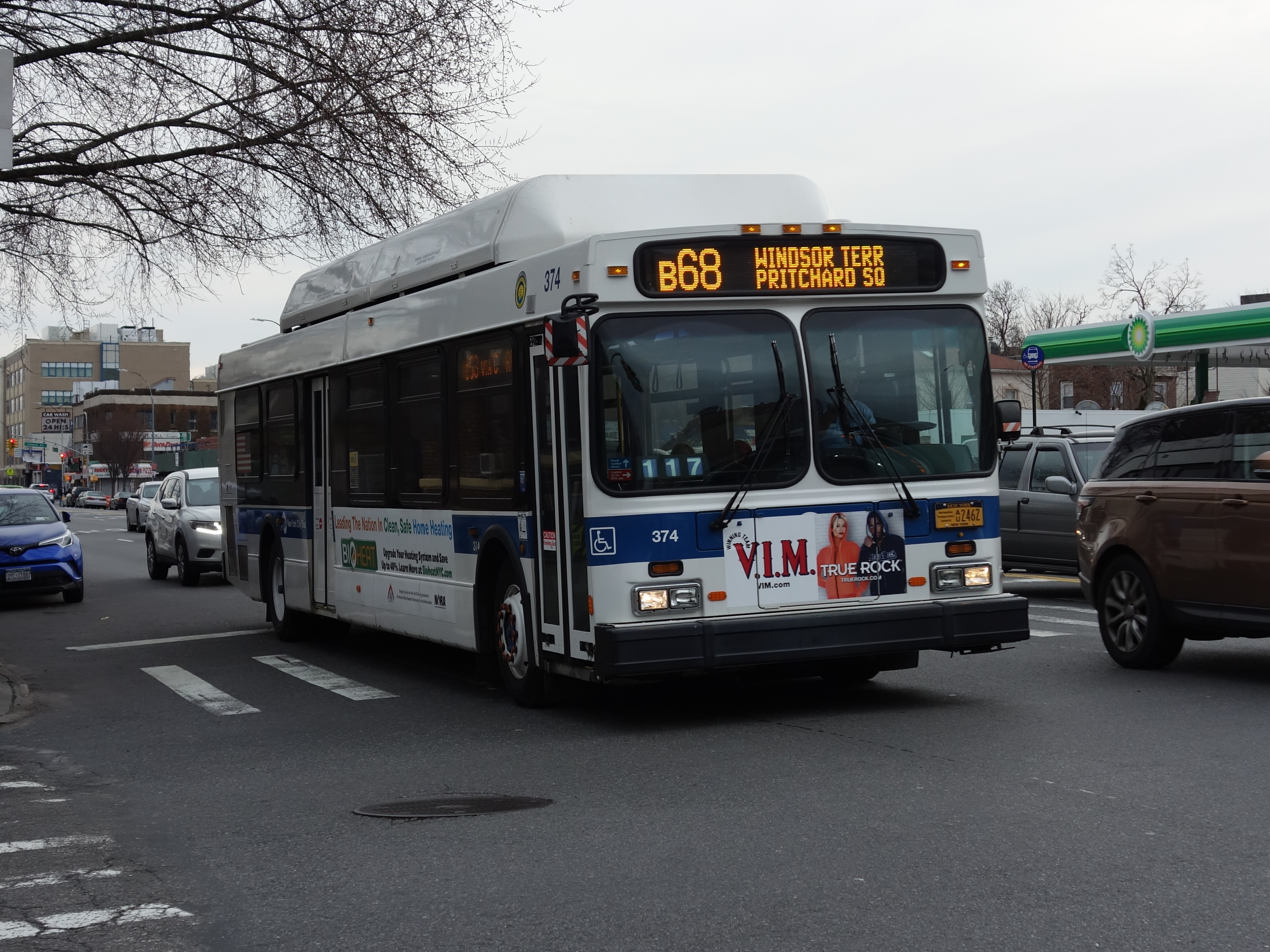
- A 2011 C40LF (374) on the Windsor Terrace-bound B68 in Kensington (Coney Island/Caton Avenues) in January 2019.

Overview
- System: MTA Regional Bus Operations
- Operator: New York City Transit Authority
- Garage: Jackie Gleason Depot
- Vehicle: New Flyer C40LF CNG; New Flyer Xcelsior XN40
- Began service: 1862

Route
- Locale: Brooklyn, New York, U.S.
- Communities served: Park Slope, Windsor Terrace, Kensington, Midwood, Homecrest, Gravesend, Sheepshead Bay, Brighton Beach, Coney Island
- Start: Park Slope – Bartel Pritchard Square / 15th Street – Prospect Park station
- Via: Prospect Park Southwest, Coney Island Avenue, Brighton Beach Avenue
- End: Coney Island – Stillwell Avenue and Mermaid Bus Loop / Stillwell Avenue station
- Length: 7.6 miles (12.2 km)

Service
- Operates: All times
- Annual patronage: 3,003,384 (2025)
- Transfers: Yes
- Timetable: B68

The B68 is a bus route that constitutes a public transit line operating in Brooklyn, New York City. The B68 is operated by the MTA New York City Transit Authority. Its precursor was a streetcar line that began operation in June 1862, and was known as the Coney Island Avenue Line. The route became a bus line in 1955.

== Route description ==
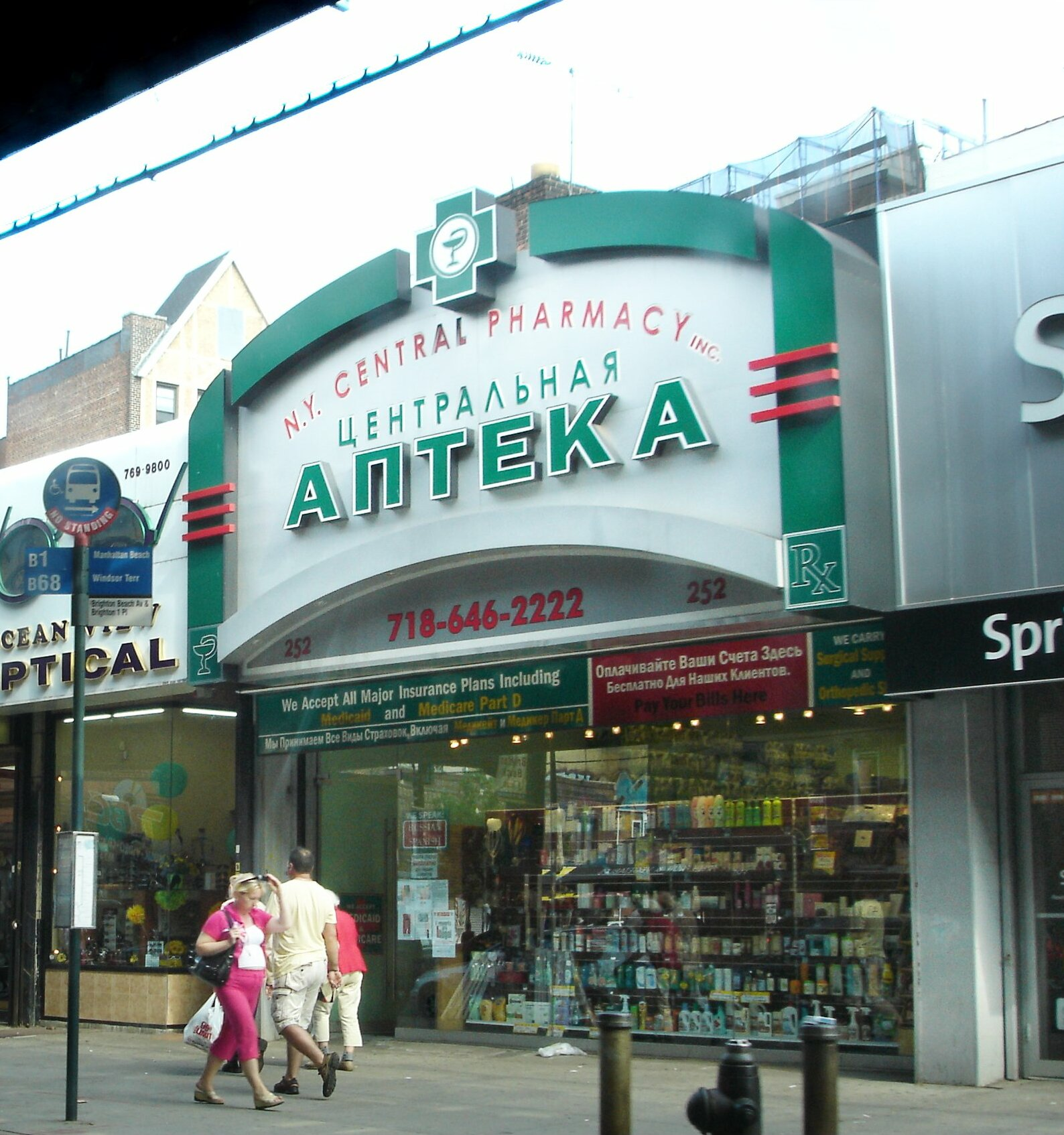
A B1 Manhattan Beach and B68 Windsor Terrace bus stop at a Brighton Beach storefront at Brighton Beach Avenue & Brighton 1 Place, which contains both its English and Russian names.

The B68's northern terminus is at Prospect Park Southwest and Pritchard Square near the 15th Street–Prospect Park station in Park Slope. Service heads south via Prospect Park Southwest and Coney Island Avenue until Brighton Beach Avenue. Service then heads west via that street until West Brighton Avenue, before turning right onto West 5th Street. Buses then make lefts at Neptune Avenue and Stilwell Avenue before terminating at the Mermaid Bus Loop at Coney Island–Stillwell Avenue station.

== History ==
=== As a horsecar line ===
The original line ran from the Boulevard entrance of Prospect Park (Park Circle) to Coney Island and was operated by the Coney Island and Brooklyn Railroad (CI&B). It was the first railroad of any kind to reach Coney Island. The CI&B connected to other lines to bring people from Brooklyn (then a city) and from New York City (then meaning Manhattan) to its service to Coney Island. It began operating service along the Smith Street Line to Fulton Ferry in June 1862, so that the line was commonly called the "Smith Street Line". It was also known as the "Slocum Road" after its president, Henry Warner Slocum, a Civil War general and New York congressman. Slocum's name is also associated with the steamboat General Slocum, involved in a disastrous fire on the East River. Most of the route operated alongside the Coney Island Plank Road, now Coney Island Avenue.

=== As a trolley line ===
In 1890 the CI&B became the first horsecar line in Kings County to electrify, using trolley wire. This was done in order to compete better with the steam railroads that had been opened to Coney Island beginning in 1864.

The CI&B acquired the Grand Street, Prospect Park and Flatbush Railroad (Franklin Avenue Line) in the early 1890s, and leased the Brooklyn City and Newtown Rail Road (DeKalb Avenue Line) in 1897.

The Coney Island and Gravesend Railway, a Brooklyn Rapid Transit Company subsidiary, bought a majority of CI&B stock in 1913 or 1914; it remained part of the BRT (Brooklyn-Manhattan Transit Corporation after 1923) system until the BMT was purchased by the City of New York in 1940.

=== As a bus line ===
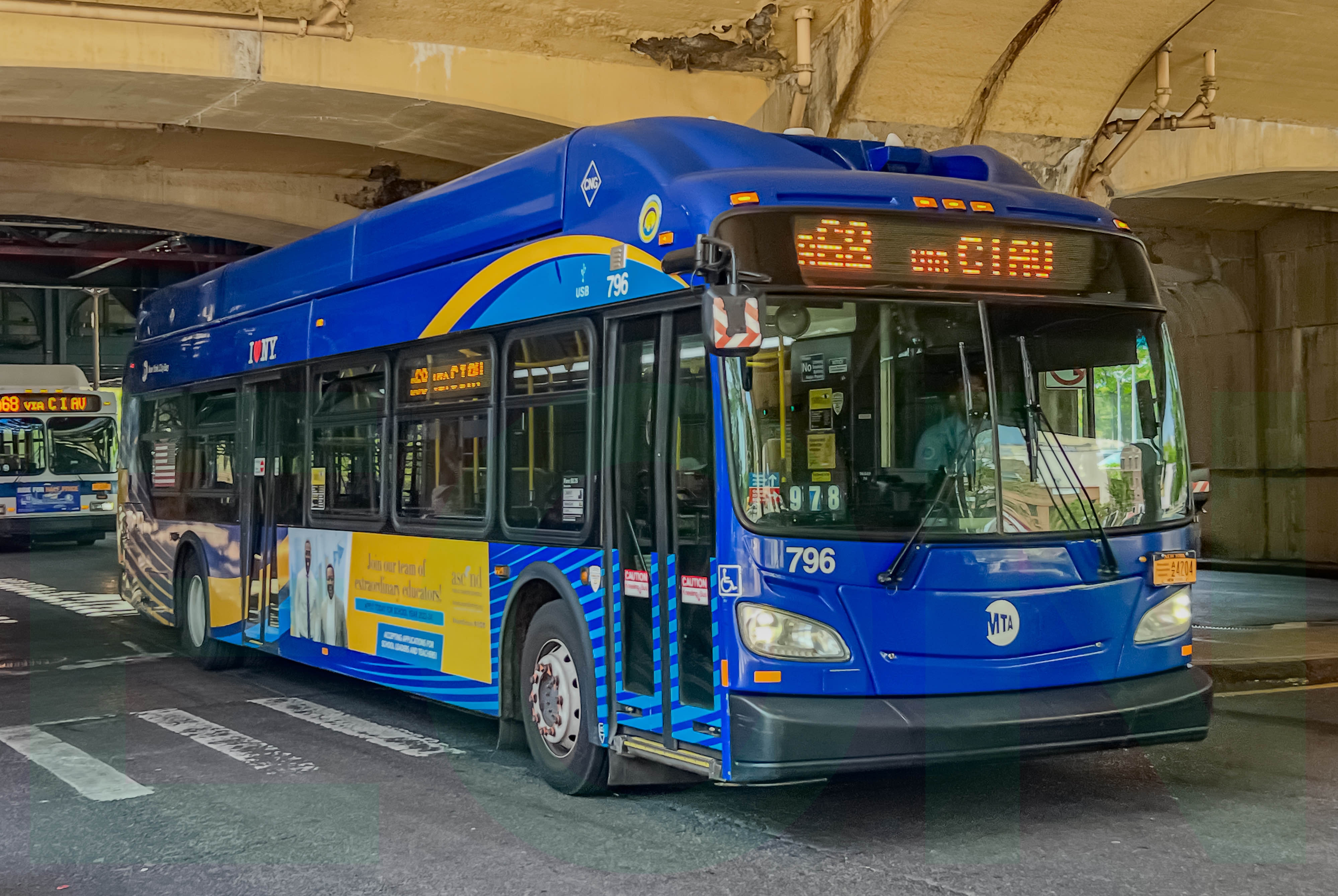

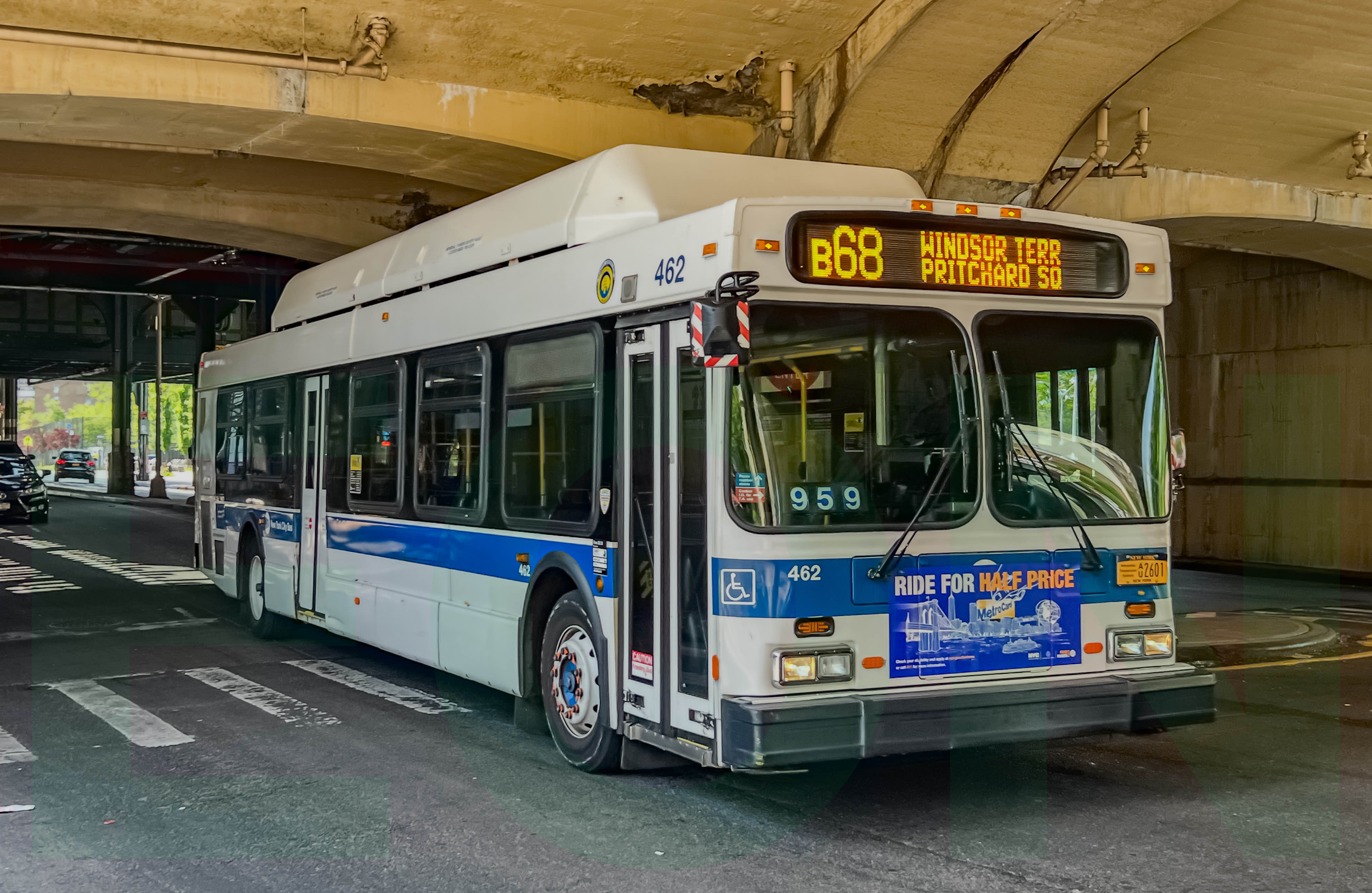
A 2017 XN40 (796) and a 2011 C40LF (462) on the Windsor Terrace-bound B68 in June 2023

On November 30, 1955, the streetcar line was converted to bus operation, and was renumbered as the B68 bus.

In July 2001, service was extended from West 5th Street to the Coney Island subway station.

On December 1, 2022, the MTA released a draft redesign of the Brooklyn bus network. As part of the redesign, B68 service would be rerouted to Kingsborough Community College in Manhattan Beach at its southern end and have its overnight service eliminated. Closely spaced stops would also be eliminated.

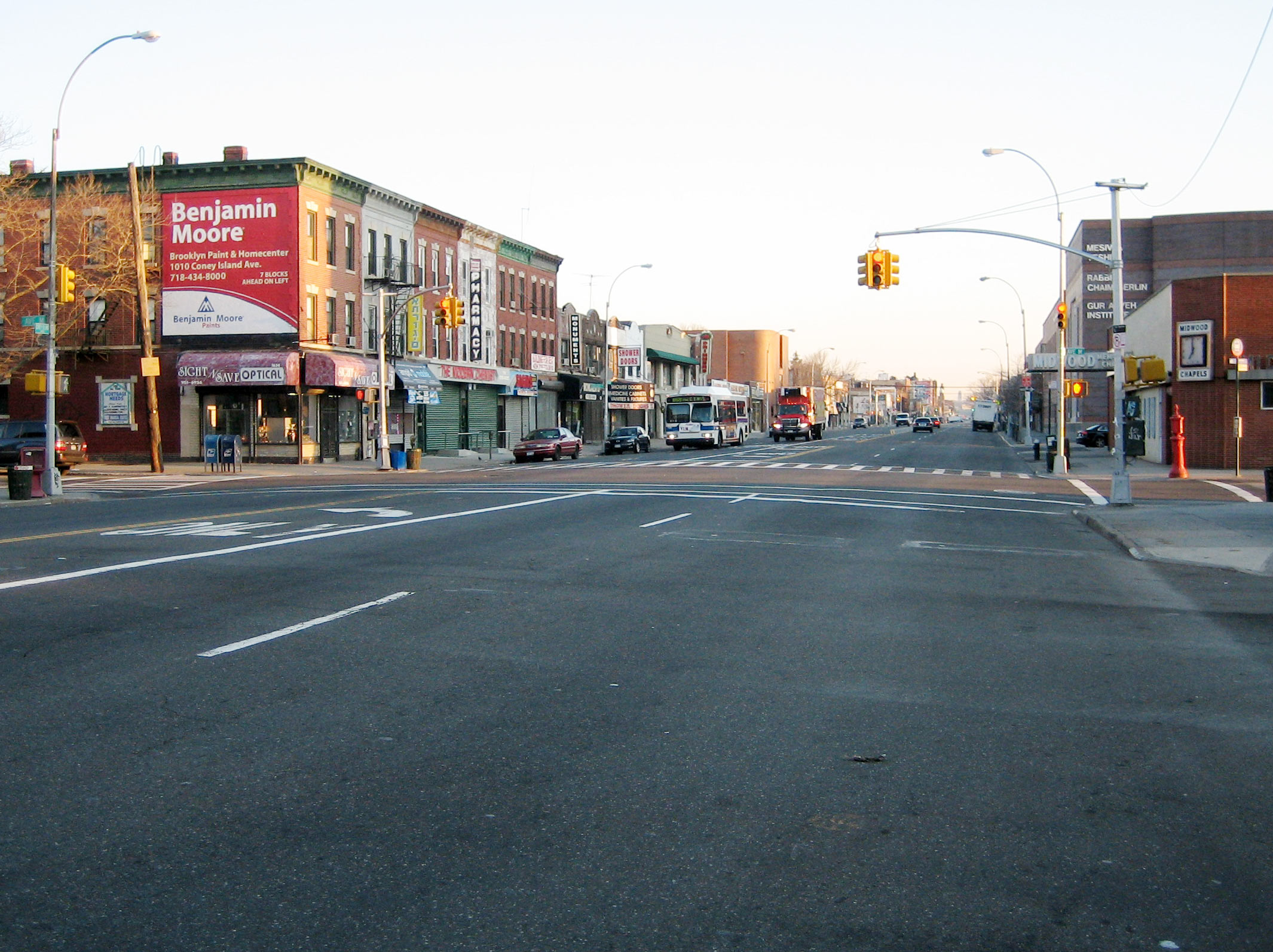
An Orion VII OG on the Coney Island-bound B68 at Coney Island/Locust Avenues, viewed from Avenue M

== Connecting bus routes ==
- B61 (at Prospect Park West)
- B16 (at Caton Avenue)
- B35, B103 (at Church Avenue)
- BM3, BM4 (at Cortelyou Road)
- B8 (at 18th/Foster Avenues)
- B6, B11 (at Avenue J)
- B9 (at Avenue M)
- B7, B82, B82 SBS (at Kings Highway)
- B3 (at Avenue U)
- B36 (at Avenue Z)
- B4 (at Neptune Avenue)
- B1 (at Brighton Beach Avenue)
- B64, B74 (at Stillwell Avenue)
