= Bay 50th Street station =

New York City Subway station in Brooklyn

Bay 50 Street
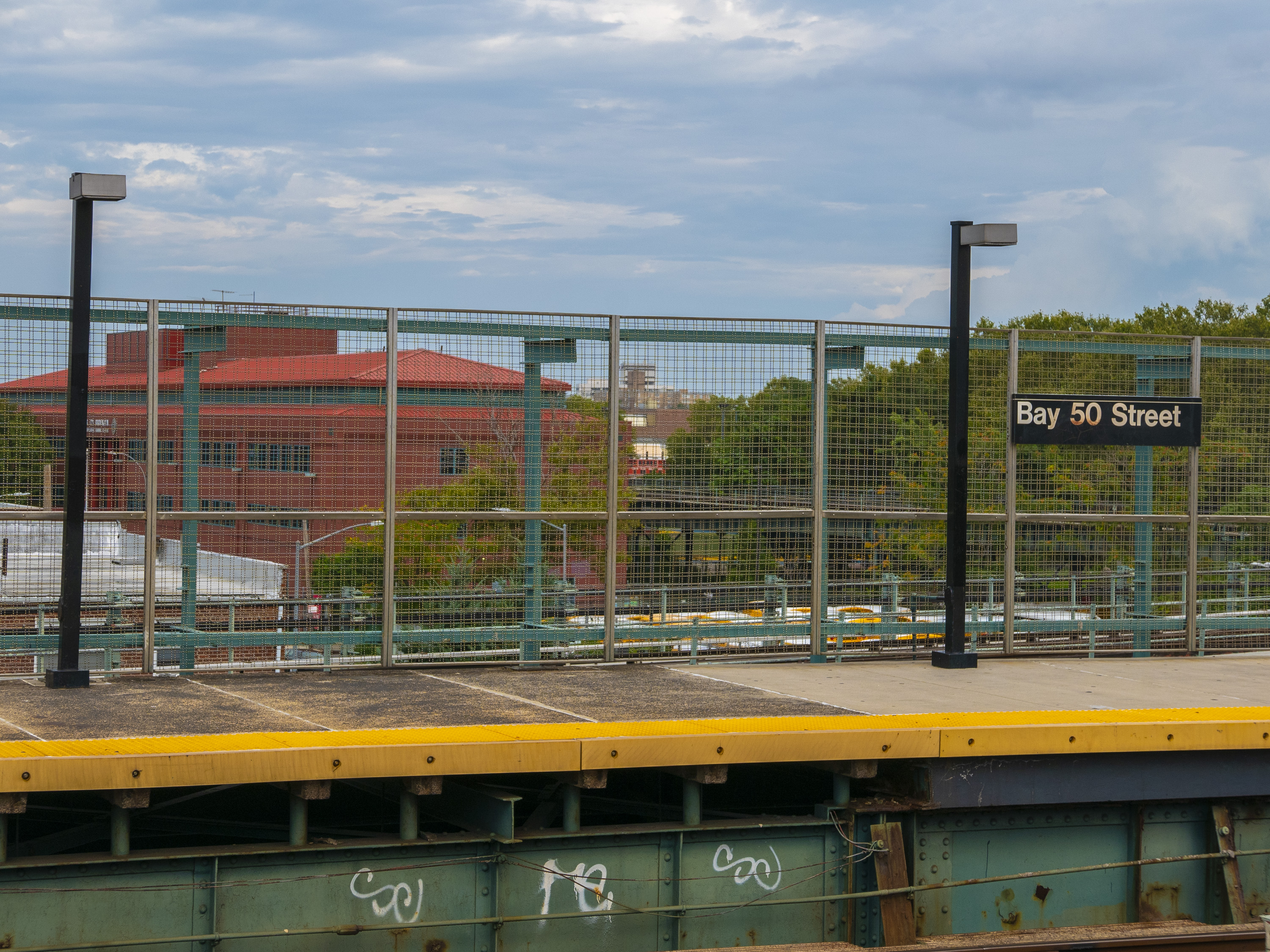
- Northbound platform

Station statistics
- Address: Bay 50th Street & Stillwell Avenue; Brooklyn, New York
- Borough: Brooklyn
- Locale: Gravesend
- Coordinates: 40°35′20″N 73°59′02″W
- Division: B (BMT)
- Line: BMT West End Line
- Services: D (all times)
- Transit: NYCT Bus: B64
- Structure: Elevated
- Platforms: 2 side platforms
- Tracks: 3 (2 in regular service)

Other information
- Opened: July 21, 1917 (109 years ago)

Traffic
- 2025: 646,894 ▲11.3%
- Rank: 364 out of 423
Services
Preceding station	New York City Subway	Following station
25th Avenue toward Norwood–205th Street	Local	Coney Island–Stillwell Avenue Terminus
Location
Location within New York City Subway
Location within New York City
Location within New York
Track layout
Street map
Station service legend
Symbol	Description
Stops all times	Stops all times

The Bay 50th Street station is a local station on the BMT West End Line of the New York City Subway, located at the intersection of Bay 50th Street and Stillwell Avenue in the Gravesend neighborhood of Brooklyn. It is served by the D train at all times. It is in front of the campus of John Dewey High School and has been adopted by its students as part of the New York City Transit Authority's Adopt-a-Station Program.

== History ==
=== Early history ===
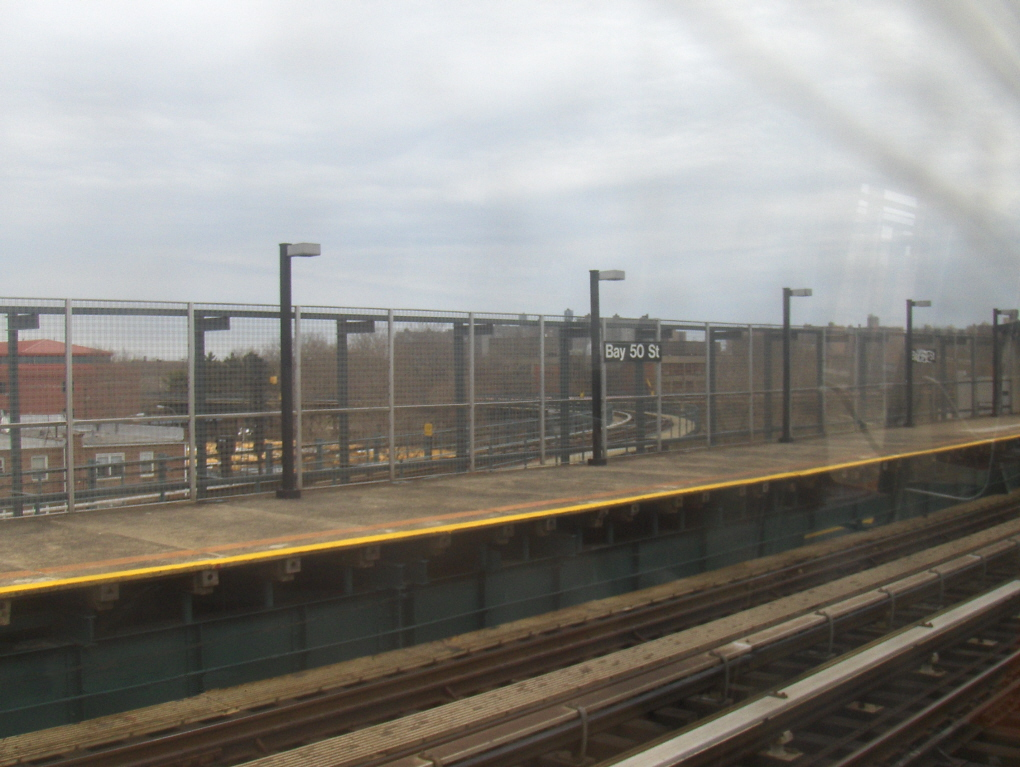
View of track connecting to Coney Island Yard

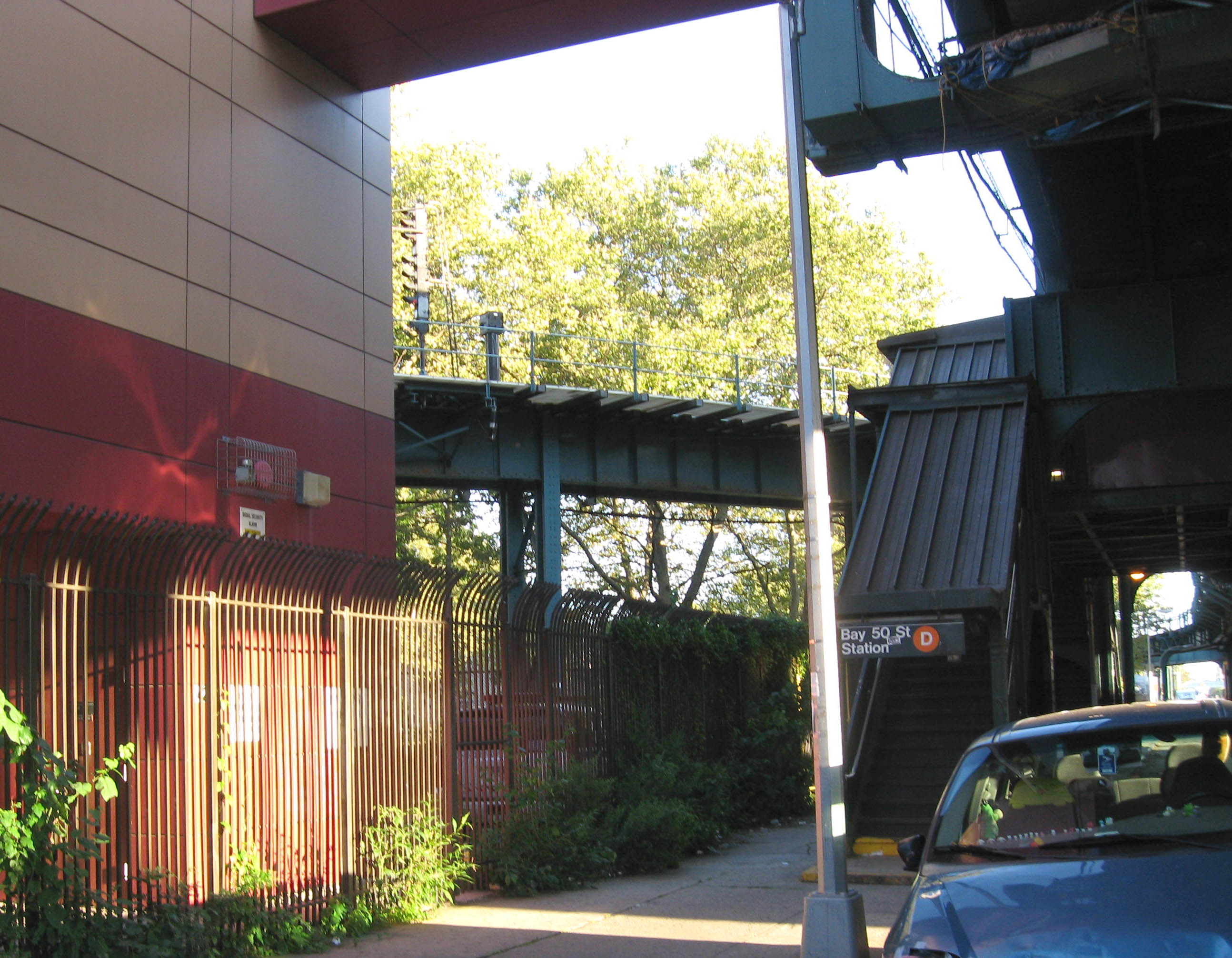
Powerhouse, track to Coney Island Yard, and street stair

Bay 50th Street opened on July 21, 1917 as part of the final extension of the BMT West End Line from 25th Avenue to Coney Island.

The line was originally a surface excursion railway to Coney Island, called the Brooklyn, Bath and Coney Island Railroad, which was established in 1862, but did not reach Coney Island until 1864. Under the Dual Contracts of 1913, an elevated line was built over New Utrecht Avenue, 86th Street and Stillwell Avenue, replacing the surface railway.

=== Later years ===
The platforms were extended in the 1960s to accommodate the current standard B Division train length of 615 feet (187 m).

As part of an 18-month capital budget that took effect on January 1, 1963, the wooden platforms at the stations on the West End Line were replaced with concrete platforms.

In the 1980s, this station was adopted by students of Lafayette High School as part of New York City Transit's "Adopt a Station" program.

In 2012, the station was rehabilitated with funding from the American Recovery and Reinvestment Act of 2009. Four laminated glass windscreens by artist Amy Cheng, commissioned by the MTA Arts for Transit Program, were installed in July 2012 as part of the renovation.

== Station layout ==
This station has three tracks and two side platforms. The center express track is not normally used. Both platforms have beige windscreens and brown canopies with green frames and support columns in the center and high mesh fences at either end. The station signs are in the standard black plates with white lettering. Platform extensions are visible to the north on the northbound platform and to the south on the southbound platform, providing views of the Coney Island Complex.

The station is situated in the middle of a wye, with track leads from the West End Line to the Coney Island Complex merging with the northbound track immediately north and south of the platforms. South of this station, the center track merges with the other two tracks. The line also lowers to run at-grade adjacent to the Coney Island Yard. An abandoned railroad tower is located above the center of the northbound platform; it has been replaced by a modern tower, about 20 feet (6.1 m) to the south.

=== Exits ===
There are two exit points, each with one stairway to each side of Stillwell Avenue: one at both northern corners of Harway Avenue at the station's extreme south end, and the other at both southern corners of Bay 50th Street in the middle.

== In popular culture ==
Bay 50th Street was the starting point of the classic chase sequence in the 1971 movie The French Connection.
