= B74 (New York City bus) =

Bus route in Brooklyn, New York

b74
- Norton's Point Line; Mermaid Avenue Line
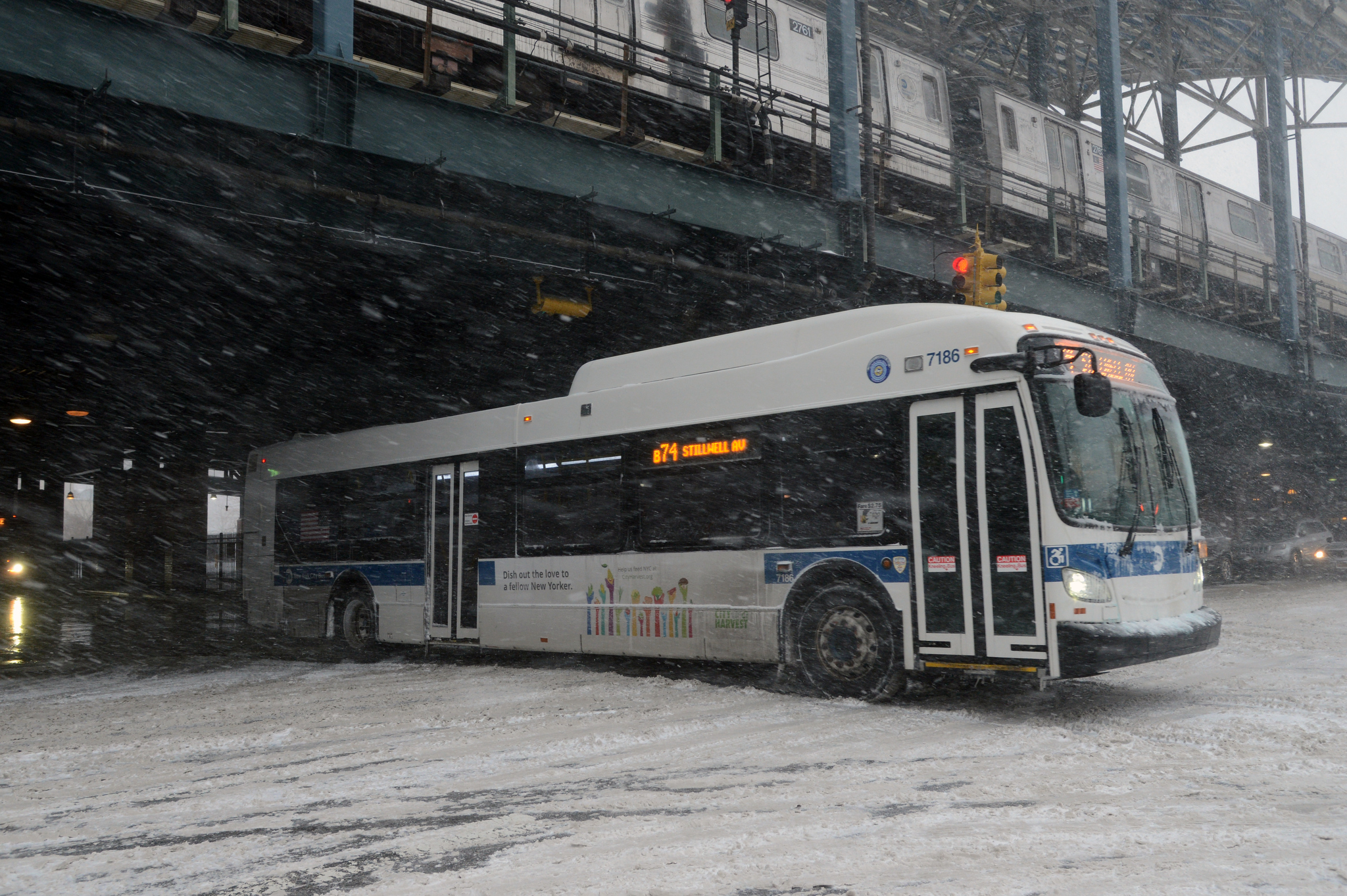
- A 2015 XD40 (7186) on the B74 at the Stillwell Avenue station during a snowstorm

Overview
- System: MTA Regional Bus Operations
- Operator: New York City Transit Authority
- Garage: Ulmer Park Depot
- Vehicle: New Flyer Xcelsior XD40
- Began service: 1879 (streetcar as steam line); November 7, 1948 (bus)

Route
- Locale: Brooklyn, New York, U.S.
- Communities served: Coney Island, Sea Gate
- Start: Coney Island – Stillwell Avenue and Mermaid Bus Loop / Stillwell Avenue station
- Via: Mermaid Avenue
- End: Sea Gate – West 37th Street and Neptune Avenue
- Length: 3.1 miles (5.0 km) (full loop)
- Other routes: B36 Surf Ave/Ave Z

Service
- Operates: Weekdays: 5:00 AM-11:00 PM Weekends: 7:00 AM-11:00 PM
- Annual patronage: 568,322 (2025)
- Transfers: Yes
- Timetable: B74

The Norton's Point Line is a public transit line in Brooklyn, New York City, formerly running mostly along a private right-of-way between Stillwell Avenue station and Sea Gate. Originally a streetcar line, it is now the B74 Mermaid Avenue bus route operated by the New York City Transit Authority.

== Route description ==
=== Streetcar Line ===
The Norton's Point Line, operated by the Brooklyn-Manhattan Transit Corporation, mostly ran along a private right-of-way north of Mermaid Avenue between elevated platforms at Stillwell Avenue adjacent to the BMT terminal and West 37th Street. It had track connections to the Surf Avenue Line and a single track continued west of West 37th Street and that line was known as the Norton's Point Shuttle. The line had the designation "73".

=== Bus route ===
The B74 begins inside the Mermaid Bus Loop of the Stillwell Avenue station. It then heads west on Mermaid Avenue to West 37th Street, turns north onto West 37th Street, east on Bayview Avenue and south on West 33rd Street until reaching Mermaid Avenue again. It then runs east on Mermaid Avenue until reaching the Mermaid Bus Loop again, where it terminates. This service operates as a loop service.

=== School trippers ===
When school is in session, four buses depart from Mark Twain I.S. 239 for the Gifted and Talented at 2:25pm and head to Mermaid Avenue via West 25th Street. All trips go straight to the Stillwell Avenue station and do not serve Sea Gate.

== History ==
The streetcar line that ran from Sea Gate/Norton's Point to Coney Island was operated by the New York and Coney Island Railroad (NY&CI). It first started operating on June 9, 1879 as a steam line to connect Norton's Point to the Culver Terminal, which allowed passengers traveling on ferryboats to and from New York City (which only consisted of Manhattan at the time) have easy access to the beach. In 1899, the line was electrified, renamed to the Coney Island-Norton's Point Line and became a part of the South Brooklyn Railway, with the steam cars substituted for el cars. On July 3, 1910, the el cars were replaced with streetcars, although from May 1918 to October 1919, they reverted back to using el cars. In May 1918, through-running service between the Culver Line and the Norton's Point Line (and therefore service east of Stillwell Terminal) was discontinued, although the elevated ramp to the terminal was retained. In 1929, the west end of the Norton's Point Line was connected with physical trackage to the Sea Gate Line.

On February 17, 1936, the fare for those passengers of the trolley wishing to transfer to rapid transit lines at the Stillwell Terminal was lowered from 5 cents to 2 1/2 cents for each segment. A nickel was paid on the trolley, and upon request, the passenger given a small ticket to be redeemed at the Stillwell Terminal.

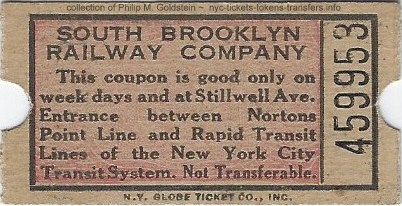

Those trolley passengers only using the Norton's Point Line as a stand alone trip to or from Stillwell Terminal or points in between, still paid the full 5 cent fare as before. This reduced fare consideration resulted in a nearly 5,000,000 increase in yearly patronage. On November 7, 1948, the streetcars were replaced by motorbuses. Other than an expansion of evening service in January 1998 and a routing change in Sea Gate (date unknown), the route has remained largely unchanged since the conversion to motorbuses.

On December 1, 2022, the MTA released a draft redesign of the Brooklyn bus network. As part of the redesign, the B74 would retain its route, but closely spaced stops would be eliminated.

== Connecting bus routes ==
- B64, B68, B82 (at Stillwell Avenue)
- B36, X28, X38 (at West 37th Street)
