= Walton Evans =

American civil engineer

Anthony Walton White Evans
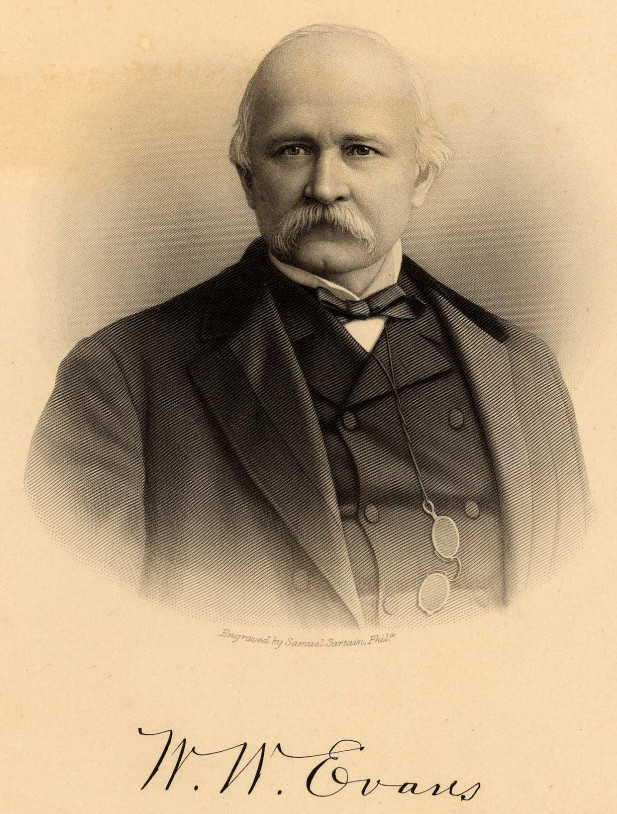
- Image of Anthony Walton White Evans
- Born: October 31, 1817; New Brunswick, New Jersey
- Died: November 28, 1886 (aged 69); New Rochelle, New York
- Occupation: Engineer
- Parent(s): Thomas M. Evans (1790–1820); Eliza Mary White (1792–1861)

Anthony Walton White Evans (October 31, 1817 – November 28, 1886), known as Walton Evans, was an American civil engineer whose work included countless railroad and canal commissions in North and South America during the mid-nineteenth century.

He was born on October 31, 1817, in New Brunswick, New Jersey, to Thomas M. Evans and Eliza Mary White. His siblings included: Elizabeth Margaret Evans and Isabelle Johanna Evans. His maternal grandfather was Brigadier General Anthony Walton White, an American Revolutionary War veteran.

He returned to New York and worked as a consultant for the Lima and Oroya Railway in Peru. In that capacity, he designed the Verrugas Viaduct. This bridge was engineered by Leffert L. Buck. Also working on the railway was Virgil Bogue. Both of these men were fellow RPI graduates.

After his return to New York in 1860 he became a consulting engineer, and designed the Varrugas Viaduct on the Luna & Oroya Railroad. He acted as agent for a number of foreign railways to purchase equipment and recruit staff, including two locomotives for the Victorian Railways in Australia in 1876 and the NZR K class of 1877, the first American locomotives supplied to the New Zealand Government Railways. He always recommended the use of American locomotives and cars over those built in Europe. From 1862 to 1864, he served as the engineer for the Port of New York and in 1865, he became President of the United States Petroleum Company. He also was President of the Spuyten Duyvil Rolling Mill.

He was interested in what would become the Panama Canal in Central America, and he attended the 1879 International Congress on the Canal in Paris, France. Evans collected books, and paintings which were displayed at his home, Sans Souci, in New Rochelle, New York. He donated his collection to the Smithsonian Institution before his death. He died on November 28, 1886.
