= Victorian Railways D class =

Victorian Railways D class may refer to:

- Victorian Railways D class (1876), 4-4-0 steam locomotive
- Victorian Railways D class (1887), 4-4-0 steam locomotive
- Victorian Railways Dd class, 4-6-0 steam locomotive
