= Michigan Central Railway Bridge =

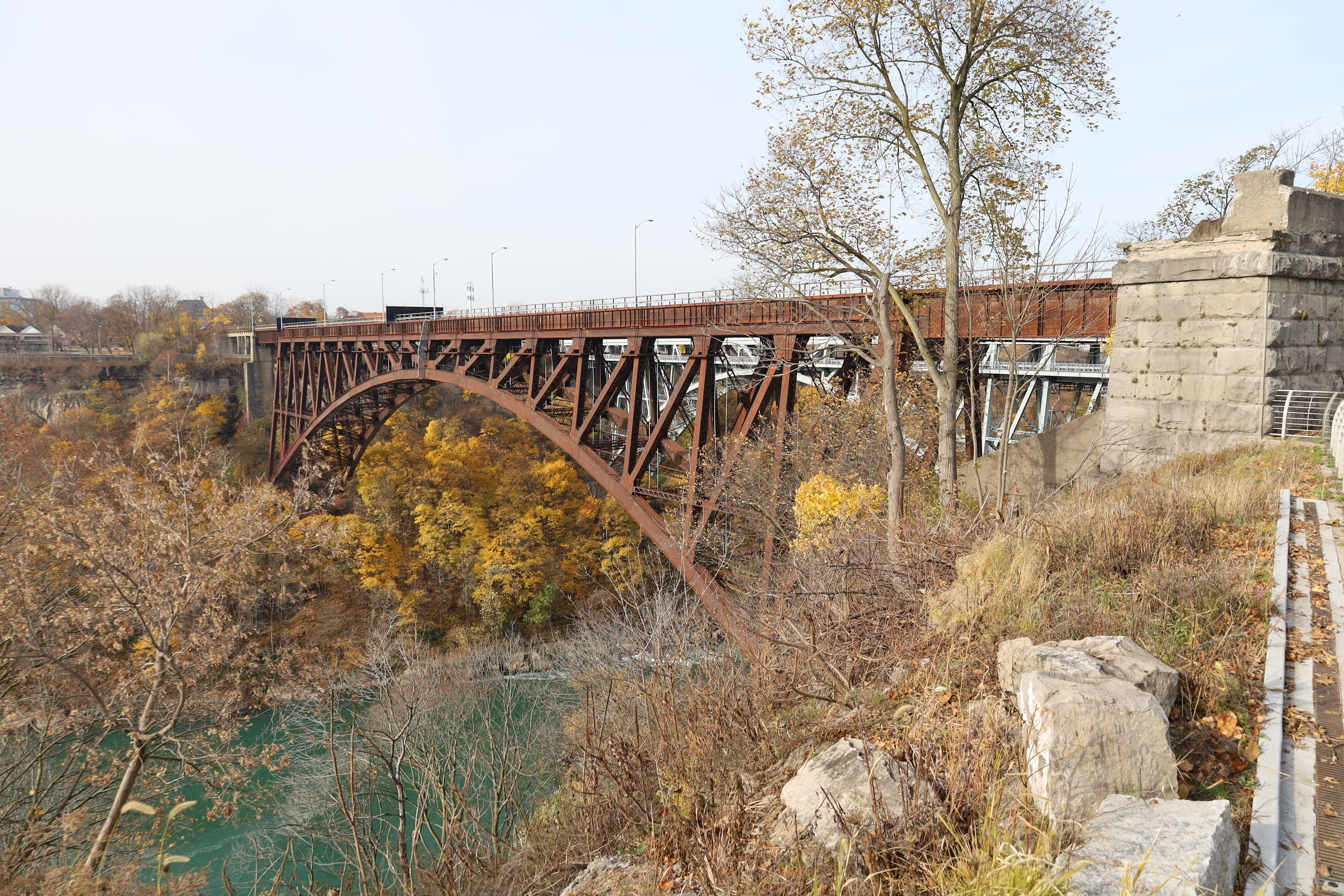
- The bridge in 2023
- Coordinates: 43°06′31″N 79°03′30″W
- Crosses: Niagara River
- Locale: Niagara Falls, Ontario and Niagara Falls, New York
- Maintained by: Canadian Pacific Railway

Characteristics
- Design: Deck arch bridge
- Total length: 863.3 feet (263.1 m)
- Longest span: 640 feet (200 m)
- Clearance above: 240 feet (73 m)

History
- Opened: 1925
- Closed: 2001

Statistics
- Daily traffic: none
- Toll: N/A

Location
- Interactive map of Michigan Central Railway Bridge

The Michigan Central Railway Bridge is an out-of-service steel Deck arch bridge spanning the Niagara Gorge between Niagara Falls, Ontario and Niagara Falls, New York. The bridge is owned by Canadian Pacific Kansas City, which (as CP Rail) purchased the single track structure in 1990. The Canadian corridor and bridge are owned by the City of Niagara Falls, Ontario. The bridge is located just upstream from the older arch-style Whirlpool Rapids Bridge used by Maple Leaf Amtrak passenger trains.

== History ==
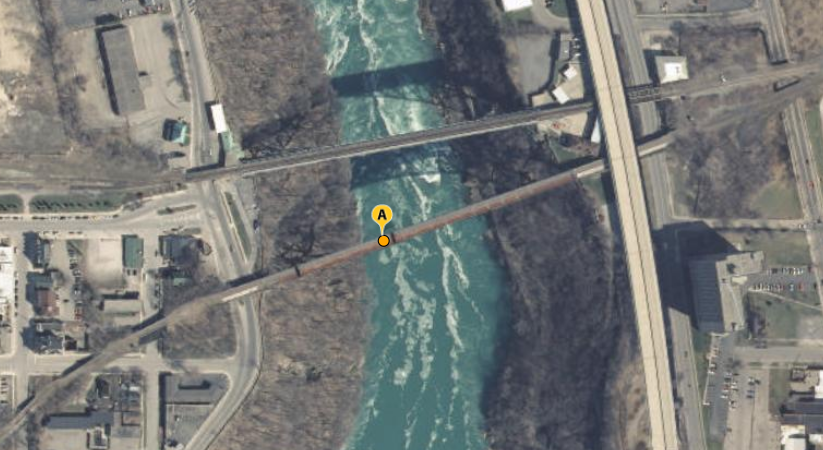
Satellite view of the Michigan Central Railway Bridge (marked with an "A"); the in-service Whirlpool Rapids Bridge is shown above

The bridge was designed by William Perry Taylor, Chief Engineer J.L. Delming and consulting Norwegian-born engineer Olaf Hoff. Construction on the bridge began in 1924, and the bridge opened in 1925. This bridge replaced the Niagara Cantilever Bridge that crossed in the same area from 1883 to 1925.

The main traffic across the bridge were trains operated by the New York Central, Penn Central, Conrail, Chesapeake and Ohio, CSX Transportation, and the Canadian Pacific Railway. It was also used briefly from October 1978 to January 31, 1979 by Amtrak's former Niagara Rainbow service which ran between New York City and Detroit via Niagara Falls and Windsor, Ontario.

The bridge was taken out of service in 2001 after a deal was reached between the City of Niagara Falls, Ontario and Canadian Pacific to stop operations on the bridge's railway line, since the line ran through the tourist district of the city and was considered a nuisance and safety issue.

== Current status ==
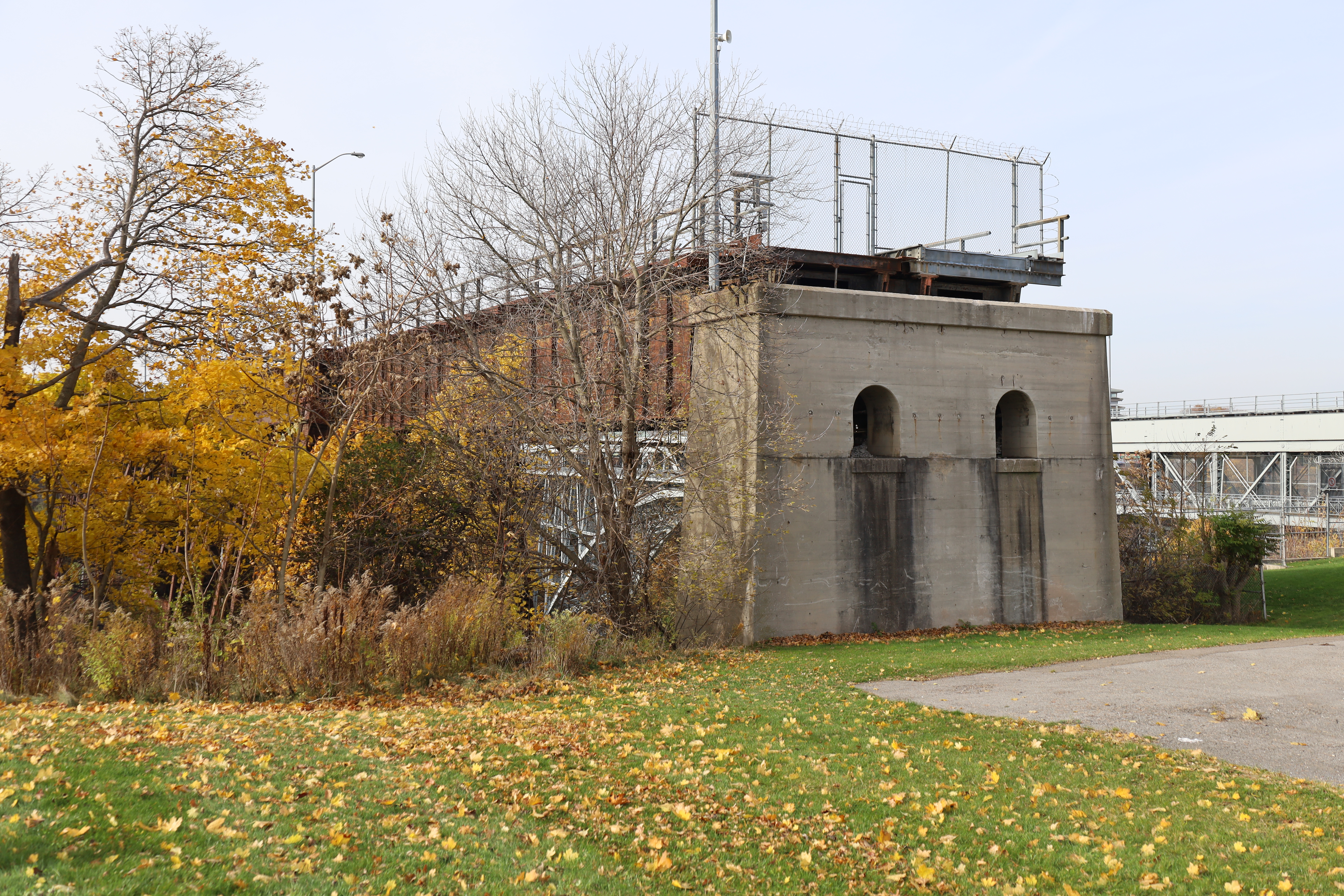
The disconnected American end of the bridge

Today the bridge no longer carries train traffic and the tracks have been removed both on the bridge and on the line leading to it. There is currently a wall across the centre of the bridge that is topped with barbed wire to prevent people from walking across it. Additional barrier and barbed wire is located on the sides to prevent climbing on the steel arch sections. A wired fence blocks the east side (American) and another wall blocks the west side (in Canada).

The line leading to the bridge on the Canadian side is now partially a rail trail. Niagara Fallsview Casino Resort was also built on part of the line in 2004. On the American side, most traces of the line leading to the bridge from the Niagara Subdivision are gone completely. Construction of a new Amtrak station in 2016 removed the bridge over Main Street that connected the line to the subdivision and fenced in a portion of the former line across from the new station for security purposes, making it into a gravel lot area for U.S. Customs and Border Protection. A New York State project in 2019 that removed the Niagara Scenic Parkway viaduct and created park space in its place also removed the bridge over Whirlpool Street and the trestle connector, leaving the bridge with no connection on the American side.

== See also ==
- List of bridges documented by the Historic American Engineering Record in New York
- List of crossings of the Niagara River
- List of international bridges in North America
