= Leffert L. Buck =

American civil engineer (1837–1909)

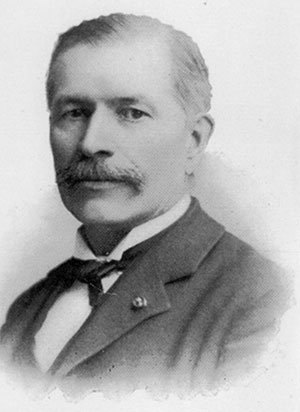
- Leffert L. Buck at the age of 50
- Born: Leffert Lefferts Buck; February 5, 1837; Canton, New York
- Died: July 17, 1909 (aged 72); Hastings-on-Hudson, New York
- Education: St. Lawrence University; Rensselaer Polytechnic Institute
- Awards: Norman Medal (1881)
- Engineering career
- Projects: Williamsburg Bridge

Leffert Lefferts Buck (February 5, 1837 – July 7, 1909) was an American civil engineer and a pioneer in the use of steel arch bridge structures.

== Career ==
Leffert Buck was born in Canton, New York. He graduated from St. Lawrence University in 1863. After his graduation from St. Lawrence, Buck enlisted and fought for the Union Army in the American Civil War under General Slocum, participating in the battles at Antietam, Chancellorsville, Gettysburg, Lookout Mountain, Missionary Ridge, Peachtree Creek, Resaca and Ringgold Gap. Following the completion of the Civil War, Buck earned his civil engineering degree from Rensselaer Polytechnic Institute in Troy, New York, in 1868.

Buck served as president of the American Society of Civil Engineers. He also worked with Richard Buck, another prominent bridge engineer.

== Projects ==
Some of his projects include:

- The Verrugas Viaduct on the Oroya Railroad in Peru (in the early 1870s).
- The Whirlpool Rapids Bridge over the Niagara Gorge, which still exists. He reconstructed and reinforced the Niagara Falls Suspension Bridge, which allowed traffic to continue while the Whirlpool bridge was under construction. Steel towers and framework supporting the project were removed once it was completed. At the time of completion, it was the longest arch bridge ever built (168 meters across).
- The Williamsburg Bridge, one of New York City's most notable landmarks, with Henry Hornbostel. At 1,600 feet it was the longest bridge in the world when completed in 1903 and a key factor in opening Brooklyn up as a working-class neighborhood for Manhattan. The bridge is well known for its vast reach and massive symmetry.

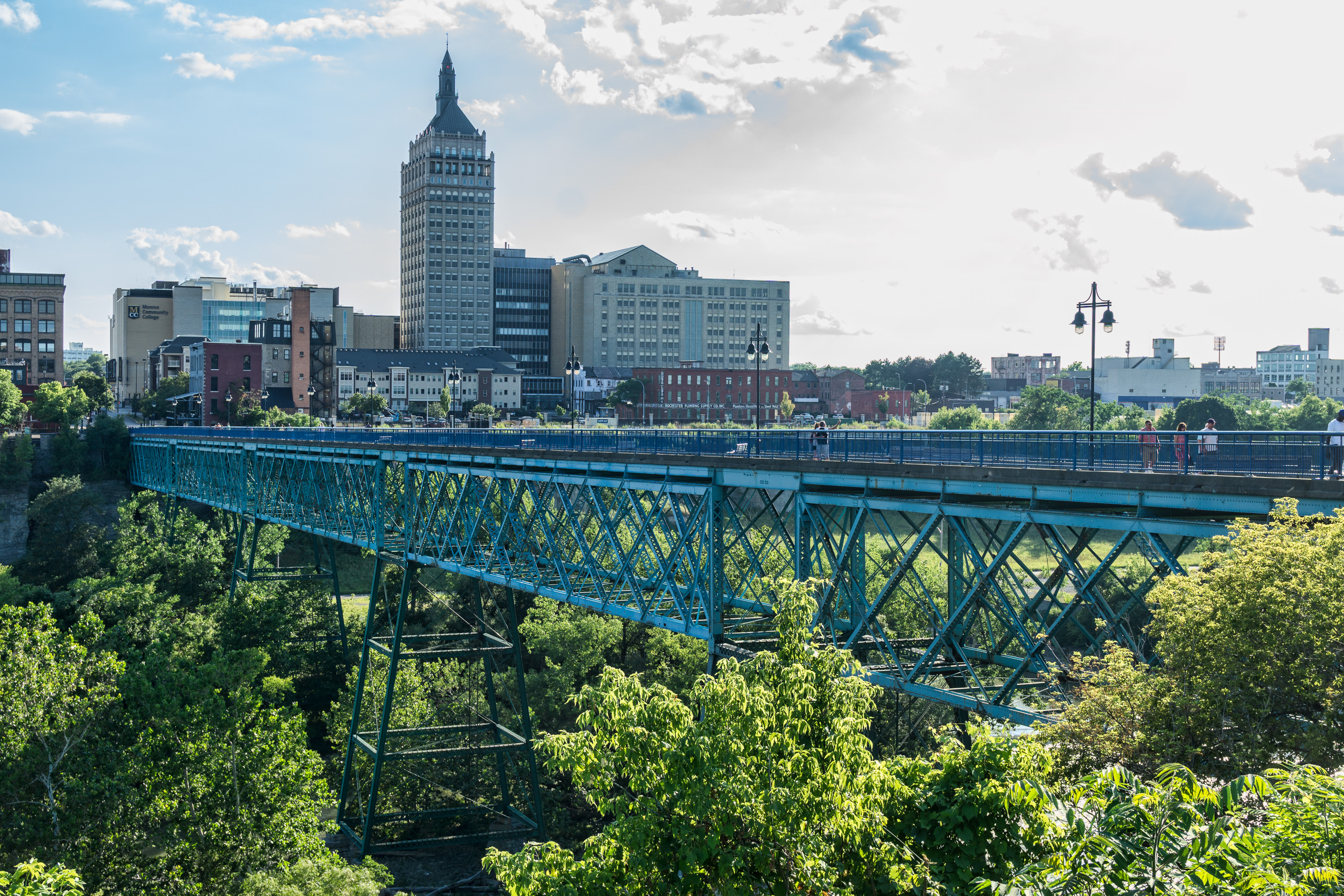
Pont De Rennes

- The Pont De Rennes bridge (former Platt Street bridge) that spans the Genesee River in Rochester at the High Falls.
- Engineered the Queensboro Bridge in New York City.

== Death and legacy ==
Buck died on July 7, 1909, in Hastings, New York. His widow, Mira Gould Buck, died in Eastview, New York, in 1946 at the age of 84.

A dormitory in the Quadrangle complex at Rensselaer is named after him.
