= Niagara Falls Suspension Bridge =

Defunct bridge spanning the Niagara River

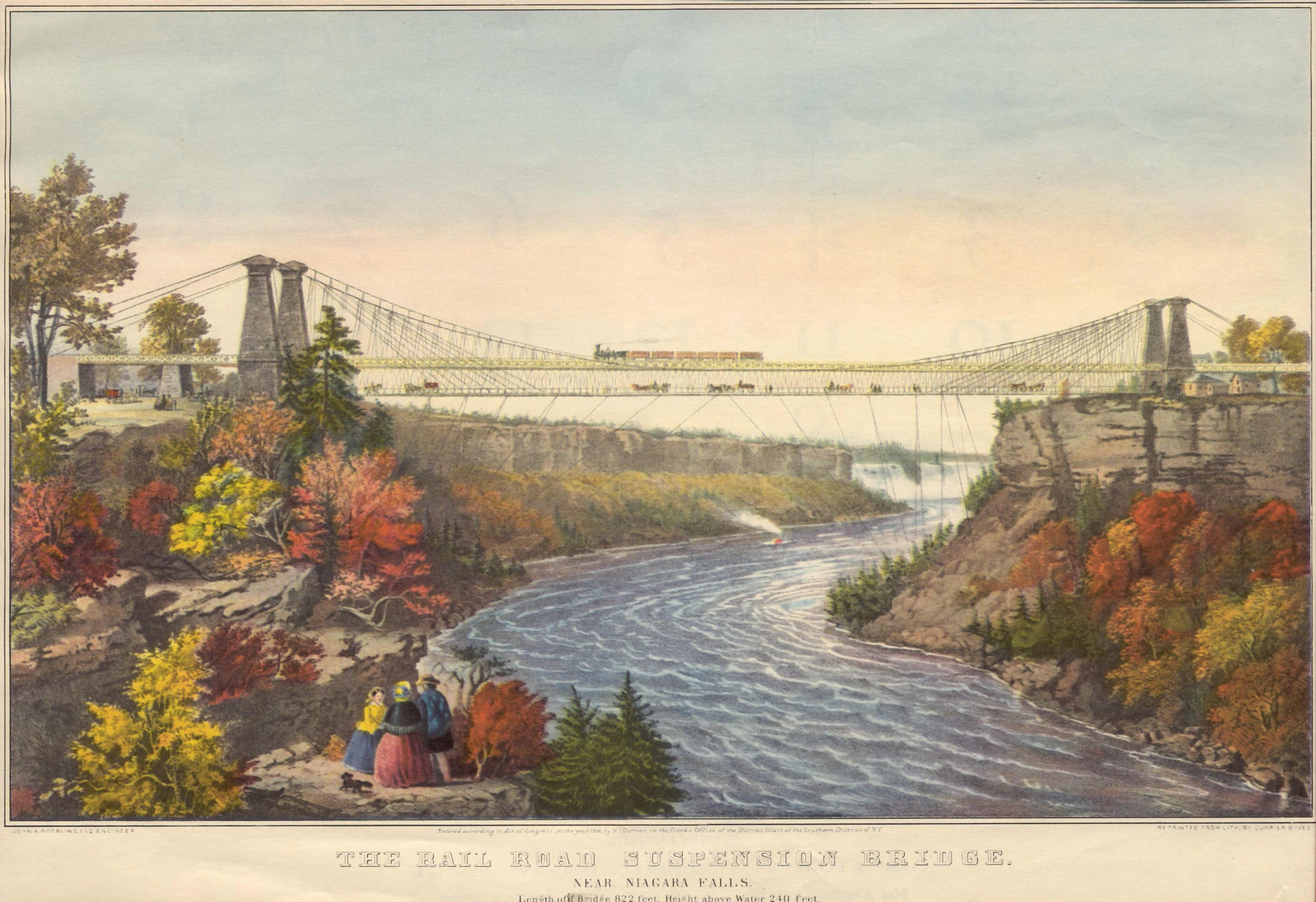
- Hand-colored lithograph of the Suspension Bridge as seen from the American side; the bridge's architecture, the distant Niagara Falls, and the Maid of the Mist below the bridge are visible.
- Coordinates: 43°06′33″N 79°03′30″W
- Carries: Trains and carriages
- Crosses: Niagara River
- Locale: Niagara Falls, New York and Niagara Falls, Ontario
- Official name: International Suspension Bridge (United States); Niagara Falls Suspension Bridge (Canada)
- Maintained by: Niagara Falls International Bridge Company (United States); Niagara Falls Suspension Bridge Company (Canada)

Characteristics
- Design: Suspension bridge
- Material: Wood, limestone, cast iron, and wrought iron (gradually replaced with steel)
- Longest span: 825 feet (251 m)
- Load limit: 450 short tons (410 t; 400 long tons)
- Clearance below: 250 ft (76 m)

History
- Designer: Charles Ellet Jr. (1847–1848); John A. Roebling (1851–1855); Leffert L. Buck (1877–1886)
- Opened: August 1, 1848 (temporary bridge); March 18, 1855 (railway)
- Closed: 1896, dismantled by August 27, 1897, replaced by the Whirlpool Rapids Bridge

Statistics
- Daily traffic: 45 trains per day (1860)
- Toll: 25 cents per person, 50 cents per horse-carriage, 50 cents per carriage passenger (1873)

Location
- Interactive map of Niagara Falls Suspension Bridge

The Niagara Falls Suspension Bridge was the world's first working railway suspension bridge, spanning the Niagara River from 1855 to 1897. It spanned 825 feet (251 m) and stood 2.5 miles (4.0 km) downstream of Niagara Falls, where it connected Niagara Falls, Ontario to Niagara Falls, New York. Trains used the upper of its two decks, while pedestrians and carriages used the lower. The bridge was the idea of Canadian politicians, and it was built by an American company and a Canadian company. It was most commonly called the Suspension Bridge, although other names included Niagara Railway Suspension Bridge, Niagara Suspension Bridge, and its official American name of the International Suspension Bridge.

The bridge was part of Canadian politician William Hamilton Merritt's vision to promote trade within his country and with its neighbor the United States. Many, including bridge builders, argued that a suspension bridge could not support the safe passage of trains. Nonetheless, the bridge companies hired Charles Ellet Jr., who laid a line by a kite across the 800-foot (240 m) chasm and built a temporary suspension bridge in 1848. Ellet left the project after a financial dispute with the bridge companies, who hired John Augustus Roebling to complete the project. By 1854, his bridge was nearly complete, and the lower deck was opened for pedestrian and carriage travel. On March 18, 1855, a fully laden passenger train officially opened the completed bridge.

The Suspension Bridge was a border crossing between Canada and the United States, and it played significant roles in the histories of the Niagara region and the two countries. Three railway lines crossed over the bridge, connecting cities on both sides of the border. The Great Western Railway, New York Central Railroad, and New York and Erie Rail Road differed in track gauge; the bridge used a triple gauge system to conserve space, overlapping two tracks on top of each other and using a rail of each to form the third track. The railroads brought a large influx of trade and tourists into the region around the Niagara Falls. In the time leading to the American Civil War, the Underground Railroad helped slaves in the United States escape across the Suspension Bridge to freedom in Canada. After the war, the bridge became a symbol of inspiration to Americans, encouraging them to rebuild their country and pushing them to quickly industrialize their nation.

The bridge's success proved that a railway suspension bridge could be safe and operational. Its wooden structures began to decay and were replaced with stronger steel and iron versions by 1886. In 1897 the bridge was replaced by the Whirlpool Rapids Bridge and the suspension bridge was dismantled.

== Conception ==
In the mid-19th century, the hinterlands of the North American East Coast opened up rapidly. In Canada, entrepreneur and politician William Hamilton Merritt helped establish several trade routes, especially in dredged waterways between the lake cities. He envisioned a U.S. and Canadian rail network to connect the Atlantic coast with new territories in the West, and this led to a railway suspension bridge across the Niagara River below the falls.

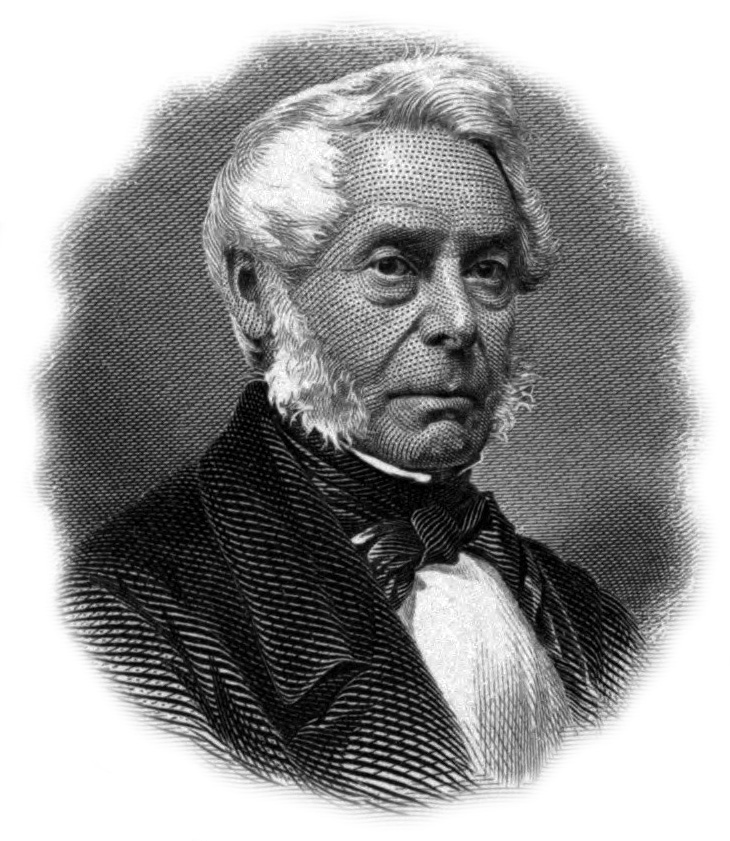
William Hamilton Merritt was the chief proponent for the Suspension Bridge.

Merritt's vision for the Niagara Suspension Bridge was conceived at the Niagara River. (Note: Merritt was not alone in dreaming of a suspension bridge across the Niagara. Engineers Francis Hall, Charles Ellet Jr., and Charles B. Stuart had individually spoke about such an idea in the years before the Suspension Bridge was started.) In summer 1844 while taking a picnic on the river shores, near what was then the town of Clifton, Merritt read a letter from his sons to his wife. The younger Merritts were touring Europe and visited the town of Fribourg, Switzerland. Amazed by the Freiburg Suspension Bridge, they wrote to their parents, describing the wonders of the bridge in eloquent terms. Their writing had a profound effect on their parents, and the elder Merritts wondered if such a suspension bridge could be built across the Niagara. Merritt was driven to realize that vision, and he approached the relevant authorities, including Queen Victoria, for permission to start the construction of the suspension bridge. His efforts were rewarded in 1846; the state of New York and the government of Canada West approved the charters to form the Niagara Falls International Bridge Company and the Niagara Falls Suspension Bridge Company, respectively.

In the years before the first bridge was built over the Niagara River, the river was crossed entirely by boats. Powered by steam engines, vessels ferried people and carriages across the raging river at calmer points of the water. One of these vessels was the Maid of the Mist, which in 1846 became the first tourist boat to ply the waters of the Niagara River. The site for the Suspension Bridge was half a mile (0.8 km) from the Maid of the Mist's landings. The selection of the bridge site was based more on aesthetics than technical ease; it was the narrowest point of the gorge—800 feet (240 m) across and 230 feet (70 m) deep—that allowed a full view of the falls from the American side. (Note: The Horseshoe Falls have receded 3–6 feet (0.9–1.8 metres) per year before the 1950s and are receding at a rate of 1–2 feet (0.3–0.6 metres) per year thereafter. Due to this erosion, it may no longer be visible from the location stated in the article.)

== Construction ==
After the bridge companies were founded, they invited engineers to submit plans and cost estimates for a suspension bridge that carried a railway. The invitation was met with skepticism among the engineering community. At that time, there was not a suspension bridge that could allow a train to pass over it safely. While the Europeans were erecting suspension bridges by the hundreds, the Americans mostly ignored them out of safety concerns; in 1831 Sir Samuel Brown's Broughton Suspension Bridge in Britain had collapsed under the marching feet of a troop of soldiers, sending those on its deck into the River Irwell. (Note: According to the Skempton source, the Broughton Suspension Bridge's designer could instead be Thomas Cheek Hewes, a manufacturer who also built bridges.) Many American bridges had collapsed without experiencing weight and pressure equivalent to railroad traffic, and American engineers feared that any railway bridge would likely fail—especially a suspension bridge.

Four engineers responded: Edward Serrell, Samuel Keefer, Charles Ellet Jr., and John Augustus Roebling. All submitted designs for a suspension bridge. At the time of the bidding, Ellet and Roebling were acknowledged as masters of suspension bridge building in America. Roebling submitted two designs, a conservative single-deck suspension bridge and a double-decked version, both with meticulous calculations and drawings. Instead of relying solely on submissions, Charles Ellet Jr. took a proactive approach. When he got wind of the project in 1845, he wrote to Charles B. Stuart, chief engineer of the Great Western Railway, (Note: Stuart and Merritt, at this time, were leading the joint ventures that formed the bridge companies.) boldly proclaiming that he could build a bridge for any likely purpose across the Niagara. After the charters had been obtained, Ellet helped Stuart to sell the bridge companies' stock and offered to buy US$30,000 (Note: All monetary units in this article are of the United States dollar. According to the Bank of Canada, the US$ was used in Canada up to the 1850s and '60s; moreover, the Canadian dollar—during its inception in the 1860s and '70s—was equal in value to the US$.) worth of stock himself. His efforts earned him the $190,000 bridge contract on November 9, 1847. The contract not only specified the maximum cost, but also the completion date, 1 May 1849, and a carrying capacity of at least 6,500 tons.

=== Charles Ellet Jr.'s temporary bridge ===
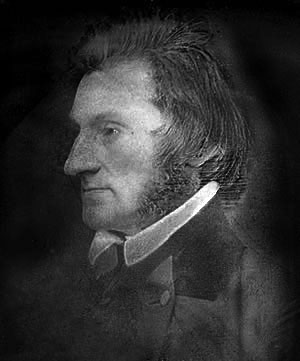
Charles Ellet Jr., the first American-born civil engineer with European education in engineering, campaigned for suspension bridges in the United States.

Charles Ellet Jr. used showmanship and dramatics to market his proposals to build suspension bridges in the United States. This raised his profile with the public and the engineering industry, helping him to win the contract for the Niagara Falls Suspension Bridge. Ellet's initial design for the bridge at Niagara placed all forms of transportation on a single deck. The railway track was in the middle of the deck, sandwiched between carriageways and footpaths on the outer sides. Moreover, trains would not go over the bridge; their cars would be disconnected from the heavy locomotives and pulled across the bridge by horses, cables, or lighter 6-short-ton (5.4 t) engines.

Before the work could begin, Ellet faced a common problem of suspension bridge construction: getting a line across the gap. Ellet's brainstorming sessions with his men raised several ideas including firing cannonballs with the line attached, towing it across the river with a steamer, and tying it to a rocket that would then be launched across the gorge. The bridge engineer chose an idea inspired by Benjamin Franklin's experiment with a kite, and similar to 15th-century inventor Leonardo da Vinci's plan to span a gap. Ellet also took the opportunity to generate publicity for his project. Organizing a kite-flying contest, he offered $5 (Note: The prize money was stated to be $5 ($186.06 in 2025) or $10 ($372.12 in 2025) among various sources. This article follows the McCullough source.) (equivalent to $190 in 2025) to any boy who flew a kite across the gorge and secured the kite string to the other side. Youths from nearby towns flocked in to participate in contest that was held in January 1848. Sixteen-year-old Homan Walsh (Note: Similarly, Homan Walsh was described as either a 10- or 15-year-old boy depending on the source. Bob White, a kite flying enthusiast and authority, found that Walsh's date of birth was inscribed as March 24, 1831 on his tombstone. This article uses the age, 16, determined from the tombstone.) crossed the river by a ferry upstream and walked to the Canadian side of the bridge site to launch his kite. He almost succeeded on his first attempt; his kite flew across and he waited until midnight for the wind to die and the kite to descend, but the line was cut on the sharp rocks and ice below. After staying eight days at a friend's house waiting for the ferry, which wasn't running because of ice in the river, Walsh finally retrieved his kite, flew it across the gorge, and secured its line to a tree.

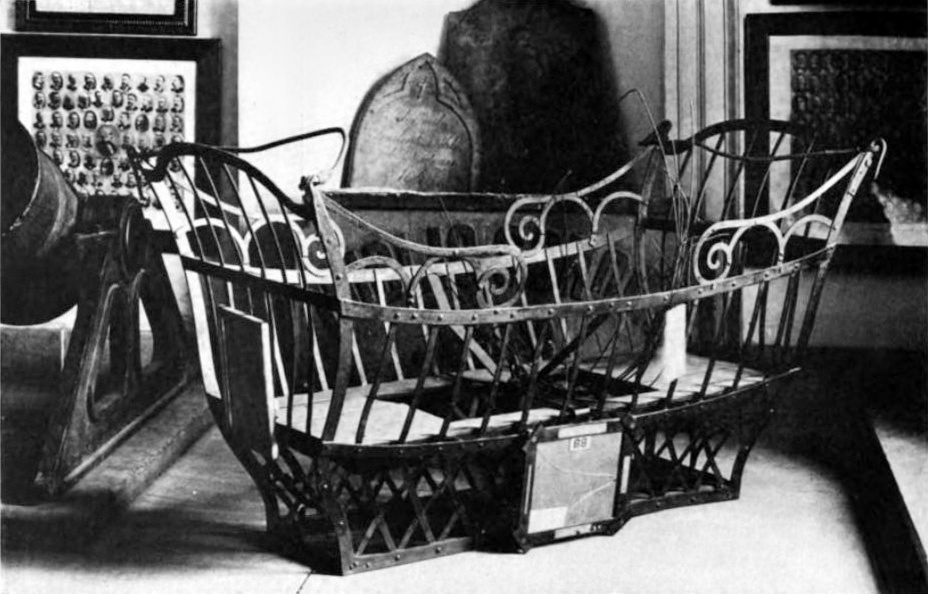
The basket in which Charles Ellet crossed the Niagara Gorge is on display at the Buffalo Historical Society.

Ellet and his team tied a heavier line to the kite string and pulled the joined lines across. They pulled successive heavier and stronger lines across until the final bridge cable—7/8 inch (2.2 cm) thick—was hanging across the gorge. The cable was suspended between two wooden towers 40 feet (12 m) tall, and attached to an iron basket. Ellet planned to use this system as a basket ferry to shuttle workers and materials across the gorge, saving time that would otherwise have been spent on land and ferry travel. Through media coverage and word-of-mouth, many people knew of Ellet's efforts and flocked to the site to watch the construction. On March 13, 1848, the system was completed, and the team planned to test it by pulling the empty basket across. The basket kept getting stuck halfway, so Ellet rode the basket to the problematic spot and noticed that the basket's rollers could not pass over a portion of the cable that had been accidentally flattened during the construction. He fixed the problem and proceeded to cross to the Canadian side and back, becoming the first person to cross the gorge. Although the bridge companies had prohibited Ellet from collecting tolls, he charged each person $1.00 (Note: Although Robinson stated the "toll" as $1.25, this article follows the $1.00 fee ($37.21 in 2025) stated by Crabtree and Tyrell.) for the chance to "observe first hand the engineering wonder of bridging the Niagara." On some days, the basket ferry conveyed up to 125 people across the gorge. Ellet was then ordered to stop this practice.

Continuing his construction, Ellet built two footbridges and joined them together to form an 8-foot (2.4 m) wide suspension bridge. He intended to use this temporary bridge as a scaffold for the construction of the permanent railway bridge. On July 29, 1848, the bridge builder inaugurated the span in his typical manner; standing in his horse-buggy like a gladiator in his chariot, Ellet sped across the bridge, which had railings for only a third of its length at that time. His stunt garnered further publicity for the bridge, and the toll collected from the span proved lucrative; $5,000 was collected in less than a year since its official opening on August 1, 1848. Disputes arose between the bridge companies and Ellet over their shares of the money and the companies charged that Ellet was late in his schedule and withheld payment. Ellet retaliated by mounting cannons at the bridge to claim ownership over it. In the end the matter went to court. The bridge companies paid $10,000 to Charles Ellet, and he left the project to work full-time on the Wheeling Suspension Bridge.

The Niagara Suspension Bridge project was in hiatus for three years before the bridge companies engaged another renowned civil engineer, John Augustus Roebling, to complete it. The delay caused Roebling to miss out on the honor of building the first permanent bridge to span the Niagara; Serrell completed the Lewiston Suspension Bridge in 1851.

=== John Augustus Roebling's railway bridge ===
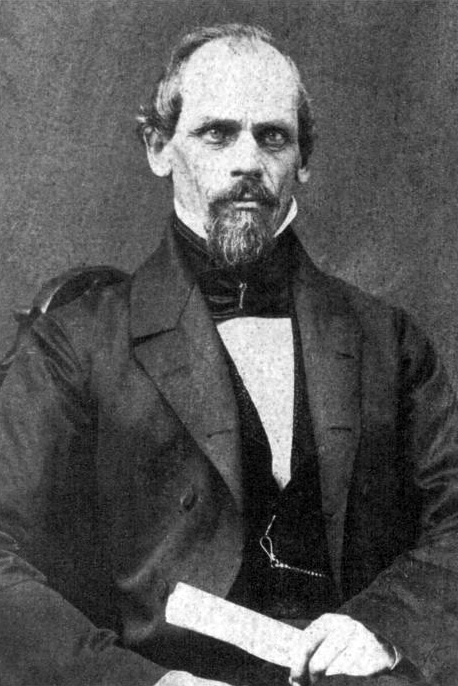
John Augustus Roebling built several prominent suspension bridges in the United States, earning him the esteem of the engineering community.

Roebling's managerial strategy was to present papers filled with meticulous calculations and drawings, but he also confronted his detractors and made bold exaltations about his work. He openly called European suspension bridges—including American suspension bridges built with European techniques—weak, and occasionally sniped at Ellet's and Stephenson's works. He found Ellet's final plan to be impractical; the bridge would have been too heavy and expensive. Roebling had another design in mind: the double-deck bridge he had proposed earlier during the bidding. (Note: A railway bridge with a double-deck design was suggested by civil engineer Squire Whipple during the early planning stage of the project.) The lower deck, level with the edge of the chasm, would convey passengers and carriages, and the upper deck, 18 feet (5.5 m) above, would allow fully laden trains to continue their journeys non-stop, albeit at a speed of 5 miles per hour (8.0 km/h). Roebling reasoned that the decks and sufficient trusses would form a rigid tube, making the bridge stiffer than a normal suspension bridge. The theory was similar to that of the tubular bridge but implemented at a lower cost. The engineering community was critical of Roebling's project. Robert Stephenson, builder of the tubular Britannia Bridge, was among those shortlisted to complete the Niagara Suspension Bridge before Roebling's selection. Stephenson had submitted a design for a tubular bridge, and in 1859 he built a large and expensive tubular bridge for the Grand Trunk Railway at Montreal, Quebec. The bridge builder then said in derision of Roebling's suspension railway, "If your bridge succeeds, mine is a magnificent blunder."

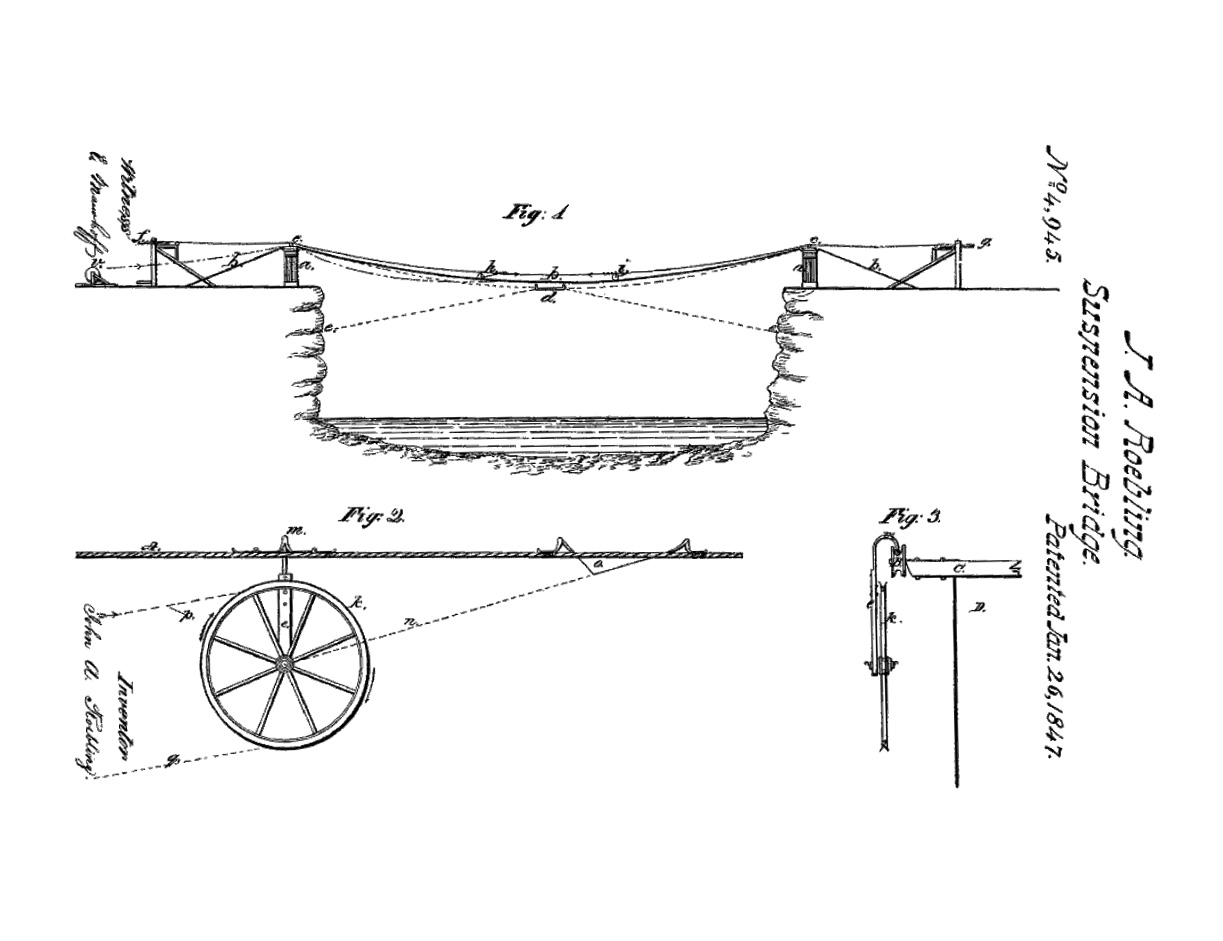
Roebling's patent no. 4945 for the method to draw wires across gaps. This device was used to build the Suspension Bridge.

In the face of criticism, Roebling completed the project in four years, using Ellet's bridge as scaffolding. The railway deck was stress-tested by the crossing of the 23-short-ton (21 t) steam engine London at a speed of 8 miles per hour (13 km/h) on March 8, 1855. Ten days later the upper deck of the bridge was officially opened; the lower deck had been opened to the public a year earlier. Roebling's Suspension Bridge was the first working suspension railway bridge in history. (Note: Sir Samuel Brown's Stockton Railway Bridge in the United Kingdom was the first suspension bridge designed to carry railway traffic, but it could not support the weight of a locomotive. Hence, it was non-operational as a railway bridge. Built in 1829, the bridge was closed in 1830.)

== Engineering ==
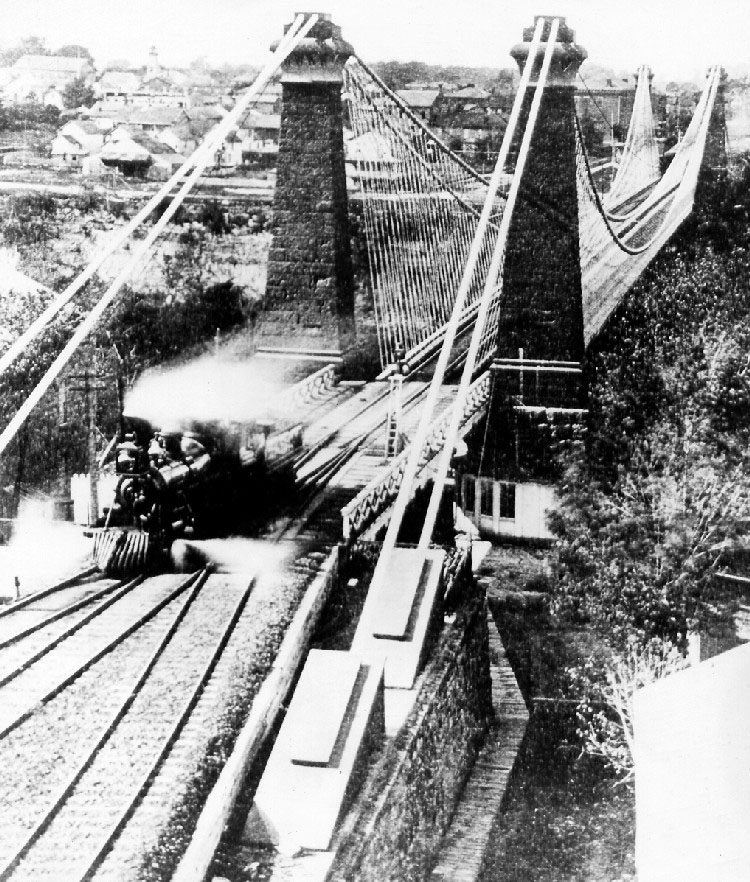
The Suspension Bridge used combinations of four rails to serve three different railroads.

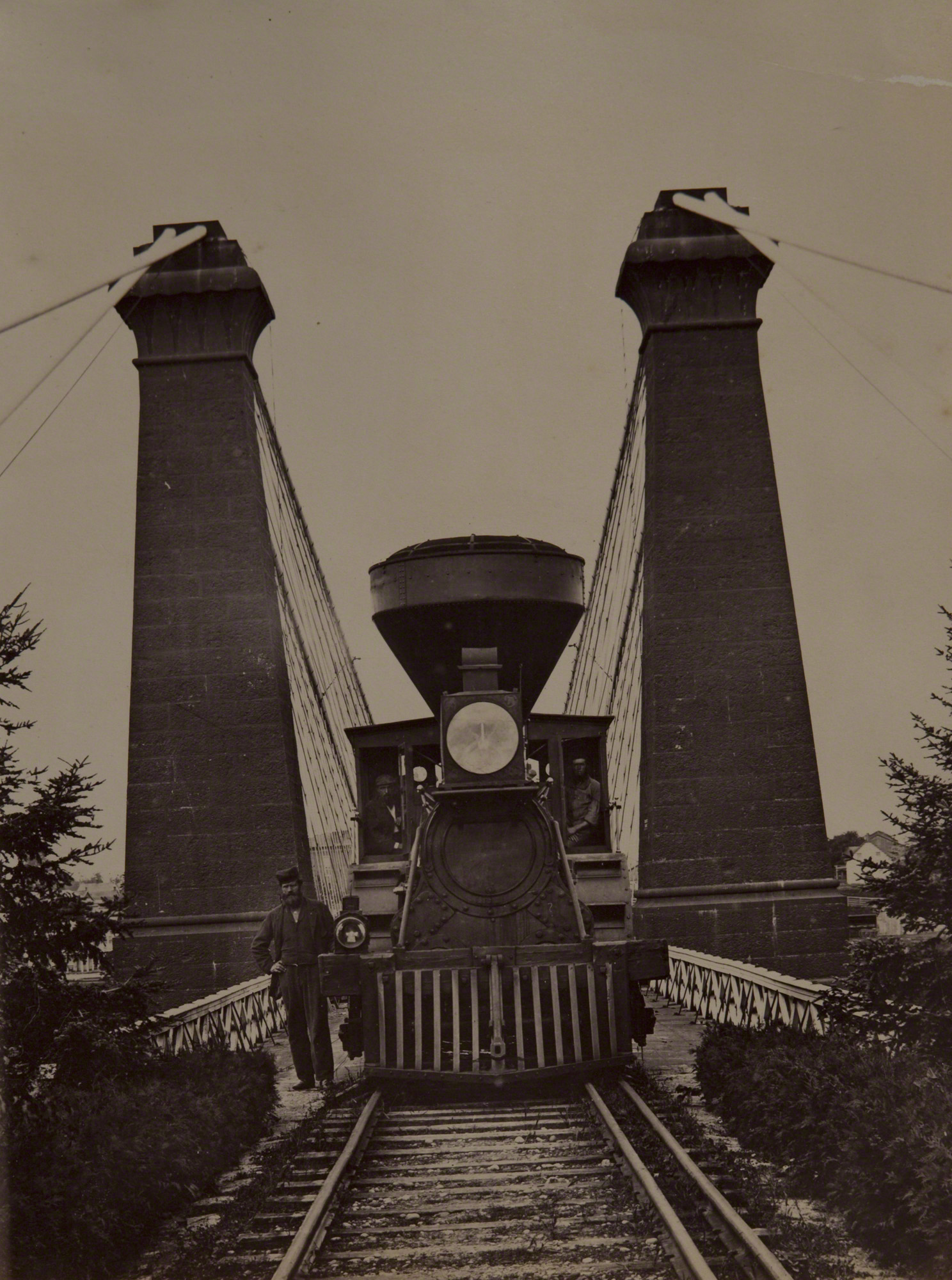
Train and Engineer on Suspension Bridge, before 1886

Roebling's bridge was supported by two limestone towers on each side of the gorge. These Egyptian-style towers stood 88 feet (27 m) tall on the American shore and 78 feet (24 m) tall on the Canadian shore. With their foundations 28 feet (8.5 m) in the earth, the limestone structures could support up to 12 million pounds (5.4 million kg). Four 10.5-inch (27 cm) thick main cables held up the bridge; two cables ran through iron saddles at the top of each tower. Each cable comprised 3,059 wires that were spun with Roebling's patented technique used in his Allegheny Suspension Aqueduct. The ends of each cable were secured to 6-square-foot (0.56 m^{2}) cast-iron plates sunk 20–30 feet (6.1–9.1 m) deep in the bedrock. Support lines hung down from iron clamps that encircled the main cables, and held up the decks. Deep trusses—never before seen on a large suspension bridge (Note: A similar design, proposed by engineer John Trautwine, was exhibited 18 months before the construction of the Suspension Bridge. It was not used in any suspension bridges.)—lined the sides of the bridge, and joined the two decks so that the structure looked like a cage. The trussed sides and the upper and lower decks, which spanned 825 feet (251 m), (Note: The bridge's span has been given lengths that ranged from 800 to 825 ft by various sources. This article takes the length stated by McCullough.) formed a "hollow straight beam," reinforcing the rigidity of the bridge.

The Suspension Bridge was further stiffened by guy-wires which ran from its upper deck to the top of its towers. Criticism of suspension bridges was growing after the Wheeling Suspension Bridge collapsed under strong winds in 1854. To address these concerns, Roebling added more guy-wires to secure the lower deck to the shores below, ensuring that the bridge would not collapse due to strong winds. (Note: Serrell's Lewiston Suspension Bridge collapsed in 1864, and Keefer's Falls View Suspension Bridge in 1889.) Although he was not the first engineer to appreciate the need for a suspension bridge to be sufficiently rigid or to implement the methods to do so, Roebling was the first to understand the principles behind the methods and combine them in the building of a suspension bridge. Roebling proved that despite popular opinion, properly built suspension bridges can safely support the passage of heavy railway traffic. His combination of stiffening methods created the first modern suspension bridge. Such was the rigidity of the Suspension Bridge that it withstood the shockwave caused by the nearby fall of a 5,000-short-ton (4,500 t) mass of rock in 1863; the force of the impact manifested itself as a wave, rippling through the decks of the bridge from the American side to the Canadian side and back.

From the United States, the New York and Erie Rail Road's Canandaigua and Niagara Falls Railroad and New York Central Railroad's Buffalo and Niagara Falls Railroad crossed over the bridge and reached into Ontario. The Great Western Railway in Canada extended its network from Canada into New York. At the time of the bridge's opening, the three railroads were of different gauges: 4 ft 8 1/2 in (1,435 mm) standard gauge on the New York Central, 5 ft 6 in (1,676 mm) on the Great Western, and 6 ft (1,829 mm) on the Erie. Instead of accommodating three railways side-by-side on a single wide deck, the bridge saved space by overlapping the tracks over each other. This method used only four rails; one pair formed the track for one railway, and the other pair formed another. One rail from each pair would then form the final track. In the first year of the bridge's operation, an average of 30 trains trundled across it each day. Five years later, 45 trains passed over the structure daily.

Roebling mandated that the trains be limited to a maximum speed of 5 miles per hour (8.0 km/h) to ensure absolute safety. He was confident the bridge could handle faster train traffic, but he preferred a safe operation. In his tests the bridge supported a 326-short-ton (296 t) train, bending 10.5 inches (27 cm) under the weight. This was within the maximum load of 450 short tons (410 t) specified in the design of the bridge. (Note: The difference between "Weight of superstructure" and "Weight of superstructure and maximum loads".) The figure was a conservative estimate. The cables and guy-wires could support 7,300 short tons (6,600 t), and travel journalist Alfred J. Pairpoint commented that it was normal to see 1,200-short-ton (1,100 t) trains pass over the bridge without danger. The bridge shook whenever a train trundled over it, although this had no effect on its integrity. When the frequency of passing trains was high, the trembling was noticeable to travelers on the lower deck and proved uncomfortable to some; writer Mark Twain noted, "You drive over to Suspension Bridge and divide your misery between the chances of smashing down two hundred feet into the river below, and the chances of having a railway-train overhead smashing down onto you. Either possibility is discomforting taken by itself, but, mixed together, they amount in the aggregate to positive unhappiness." Despite such commentaries, thousands of people crossed over the bridge safely every day.

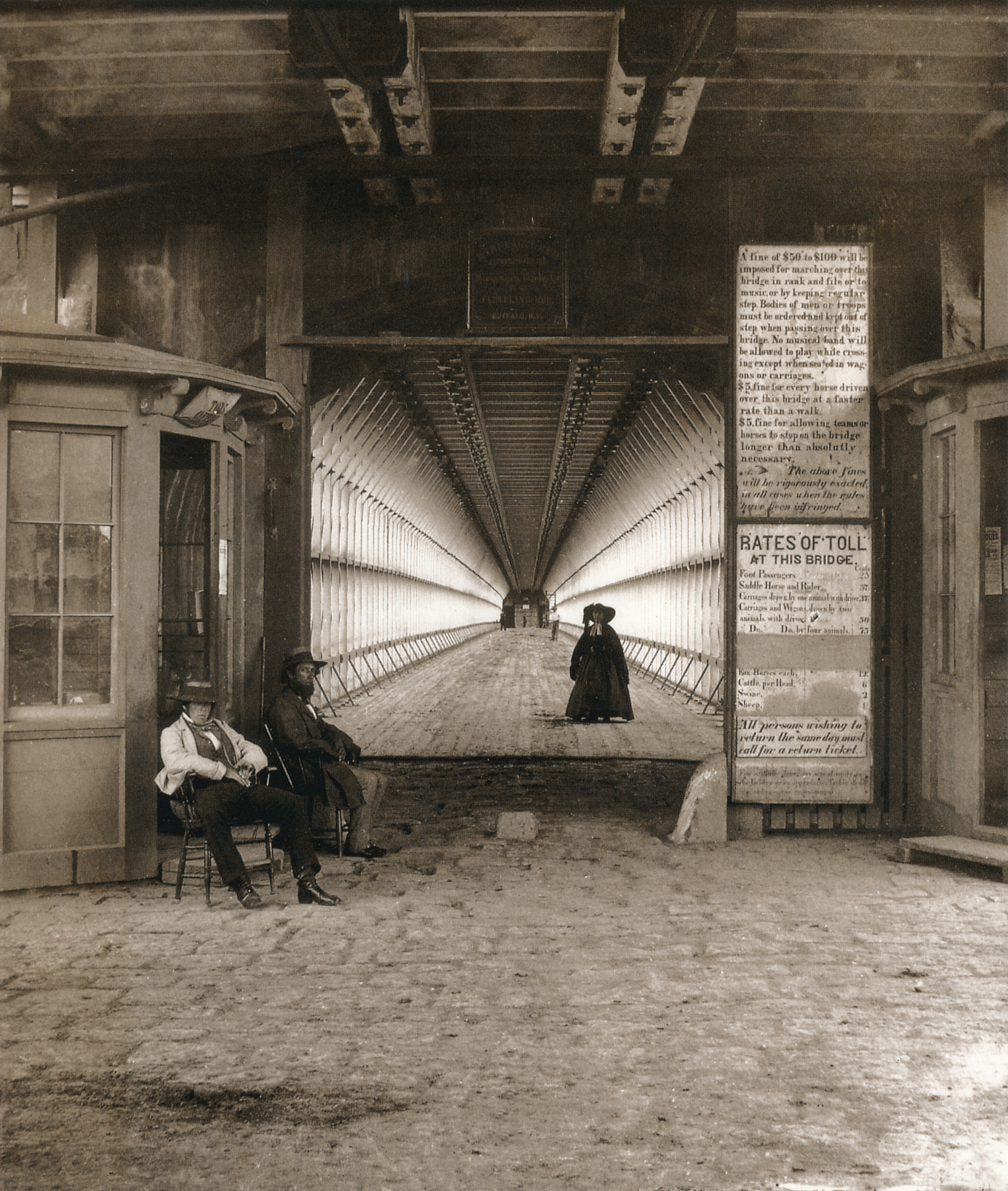
View of the bridge's lower deck entrance, with a toll booth at left; deep trusses that helped reinforce the bridge's rigidity are visible. (1859)

American engineers regard the Suspension Bridge as a major achievement of efficiency. In a fledgling country where resources—material and financial—were limited, they had to make do with whatever was available. This goal was espoused by the American Society of Civil Engineers, which opined, "That is the best engineering, not which makes the most splendid, or even the most perfect work, but that which makes a work that answers the purpose well, at the least cost." Roebling had built a bridge that rivaled grander bridges of leading European nations at a much lower cost. His Suspension Bridge used only one-sixth the material of Stephenson's Brittania Bridge, but was twice as long and had a capacity that exceeded the tubular bridge. Moreover, the expenditure on Roebling's Suspension Bridge was $400,000, whereas a tubular bridge of equivalent length and load-bearing capability would have cost $4 million. Roebling's success established him as the master of suspension bridges. The inclined guy-wires that stretched from the top of towers to the roadway of the Suspension Bridge became the signature of his future works.

Although the Suspension Bridge proved that the suspension system could be safely used to carry railroads, no more suspension railway bridges were built. The outbreak of the American Civil War diverted attention from such civil engineering ventures, and by the time attention was paid to building bridges again, cantilever bridges were in vogue for railway bridges. Regardless, the Suspension Bridge's success made it a model for suspension railway bridges. When the city of Quebec called for a structure to span the St. Lawrence River in 1850, it looked to the Suspension Bridge for inspiration. Seventeen years later, the British journal Engineering called for a suspension railway to bridge the Straits of Messina and also referred to Roebling's bridge. Charles B. Stuart opened his 1871 work on the history of American engineering, Lives and Works of Civil and Military Engineering in America, with an illustration of the bridge.

== Legacy ==
As a border crossing between two large growing countries, the Suspension Bridge had throngs of travelers passing over it. The bridge was the intersection of three major railroads. Coupled with its vicinity to a natural wonder, the Niagara Falls, the bridge brought a lot of railroad traffic into the region once it was opened. The towns at the ends of the bridge benefited greatly from this heavy movement of people and goods. The village of Suspension Bridge, United States, grew quickly within a few years after the opening of the bridge, acquiring shops, factories, and a hotel. Its tourism and commerce soon rivaled the town of Niagara Falls, New York; eventually, the village was merged into the town in 1892. Similarly, Clifton on the Canadian end of the bridge was integrated into the town of Niagara Falls, Ontario. The two Niagara Falls cities boasted commerce that surpassed neighboring settlements. Around the time of its official opening, the bridge was one of the busiest points of trade on the United States-Canada border, carrying $12 million of transitory goods and $2 million of bonded materials into Canada. To handle the large amount of goods exchanged over the border, the Lewiston customs house—the primary customs for the Niagara region—was relocated to the Niagara Suspension Bridge in 1863. (Note: The Niagara customs house was added to the list of National Register of Historic Places in 1973; thirty-five years later, renovation was started to transform the building into a railway station and history museum for the region.)

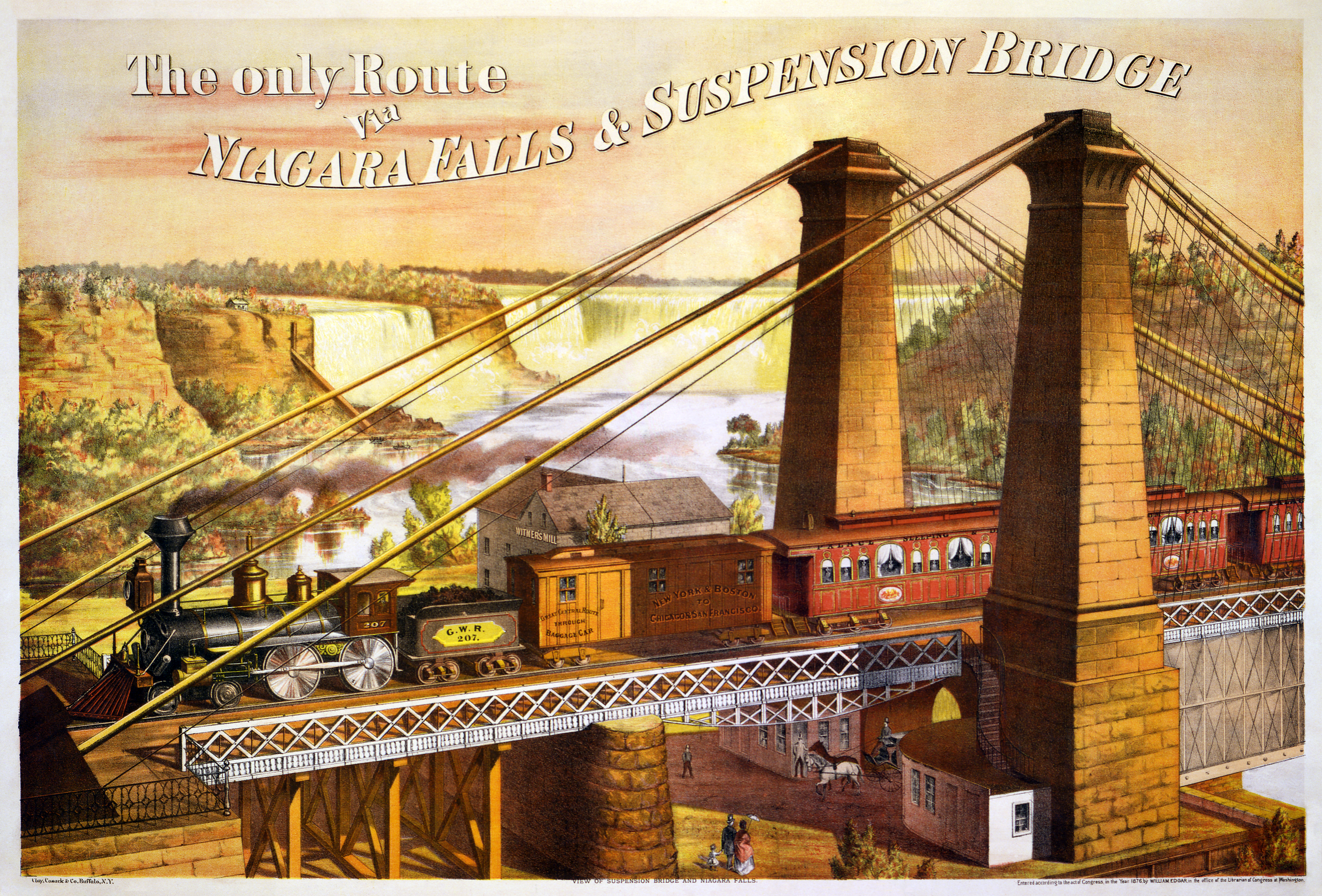
Advertisement for Great Western Railway travel via the Niagara Falls Suspension Bridge, c. 1876

The bridge's depiction as an engineering marvel and beautiful sight lured many visitors to the Falls. Travelers could, while crossing the bridge, enjoy a view of the Falls enhanced by the sensation of standing 250 feet (76 m) in the air. The Falls, however, proved distant and indistinct to some when there was overcast weather. On the whole, the Suspension Bridge was considered an attraction that must be seen by visitors to Niagara Falls. In paintings and prints of the bridge, the Suspension Bridge became the focus, pushing the Falls into the background. Unlike paintings of the Falls that capture the viewer's eye with their majestic views of the natural wonder, pictures of the bridge impressed viewers with the utilitarian design of the structure. By 1897, the inbound trains to Niagara Falls brought 276,900 visitors during the months of May to August. A streetcar system was established in 1882 to handle the increasing cross-border pedestrian traffic. Initially pulled by horses, the trolleys were converted to run on electricity in 1892. The Suspension Bridge was the pride and symbol of the Great Western Railway, which touted it as the "only Route via Niagara Falls & Suspension Bridge." (Note: As pictured in the advertisement for the Great Western Railway shown in this article.) Travelers on the Suspension Bridge witnessed several death-defying stunts performed across the Niagara Gorge. On June 30, 1859, they saw Charles Blondin's feat of becoming the first man to cross the chasm on a tightrope.

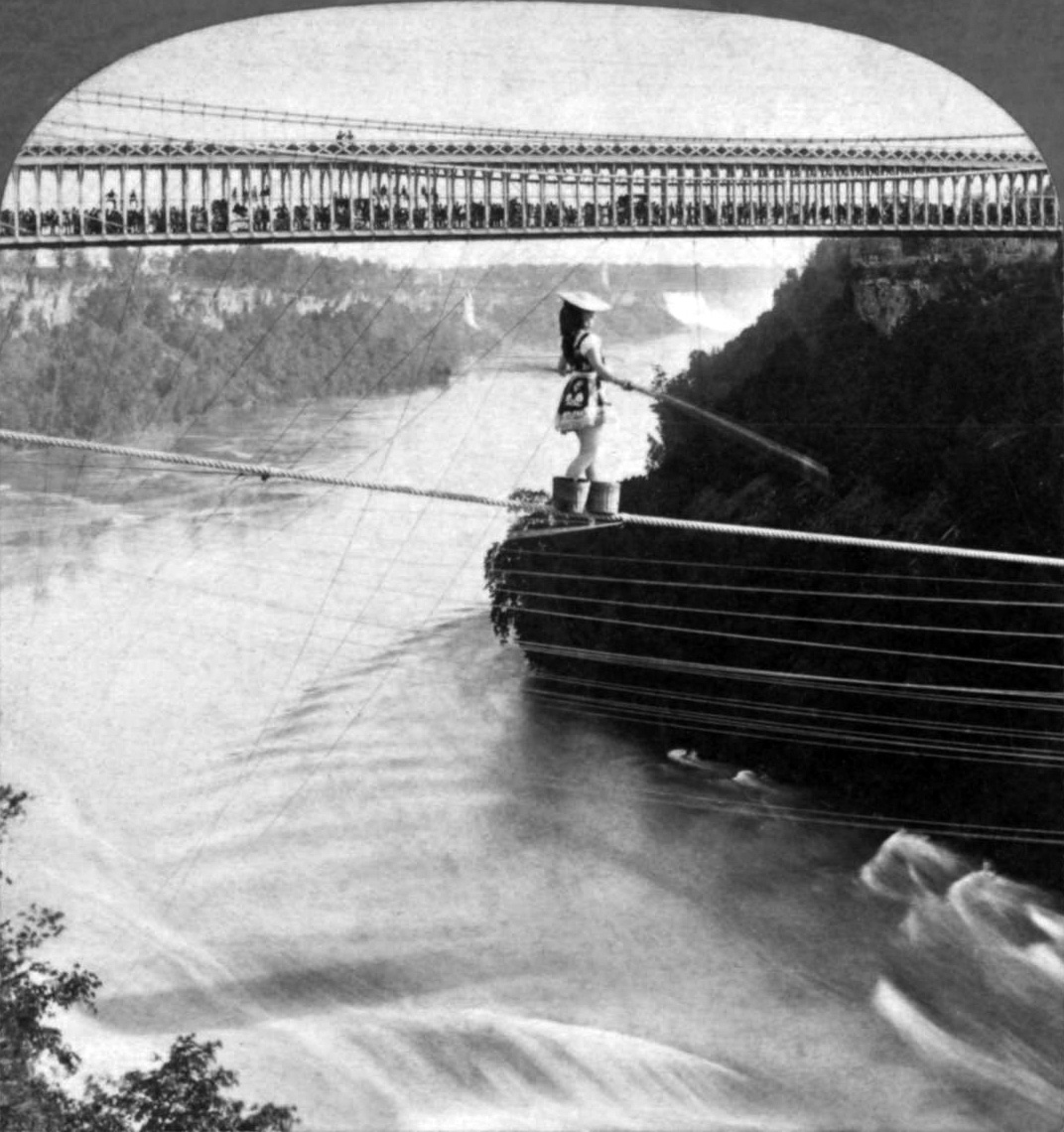
Daredevils such as Maria Spelterini performed their stunts to crowds on the shore and the Suspension Bridge.

Some enslaved African-Americans who escaped to Canada used the bridge as part of the Underground Railroad, one of four main routes on the network. Before the Suspension Bridge was completed, fugitives either crossed the raging river on a boat or risked their lives by swimming at calmer points of the river. The Suspension Bridge made escape across the river easier and safer, although there was still a risk. To avoid getting caught and sent back to their owners, enslaved people had to sneak across on foot or hide aboard trains and oxcarts when using the bridge.

When the American Civil War ended and the United States turned its focus toward rebuilding, Roebling sought state approval to build the Brooklyn Bridge. The government wanted a thorough review of the engineer's credentials; hence, a Bridge Party was organized. Comprising Roebling and his son, as well as their fellow bridge engineers, generals, businessmen, and high society figures, the party toured the country to review four bridges Roebling had built before the civil war. The final item on their itinerary was Roebling's Niagara Suspension Bridge. At the dinner to commemorate the end of the bridge tour, civil war veteran General Henry Warner Slocum gave a toast and called the Suspension Bridge a symbol of inspiration for the United States in its rebuilding efforts. This sentiment was shared by the guests and was expressed at later dinners across the United States. The achievement of building a large suspension bridge over a gorge in the face of overwhelming adversity—constant put-downs by the professional community, American and European—gave the United States a sense of pride. Nationalism rose as the country lauded the bridge. The completion of the bridge that had been deemed impossible by the Western world gave Americans, who had lesser technical accomplishments than Europe at that time, a trophy for their achievements. The Suspension Bridge became the American symbol to brave the toughest of challenges and do the impossible, pushing their drive for industrialization even harder. Charles W. Woodman specifically drew attention to the Suspension Bridge in his 1865 address to the United States Senate for approval to build a rail system to transport a ship out of the water and up around the Niagara Falls.

== Maintenance and replacement ==
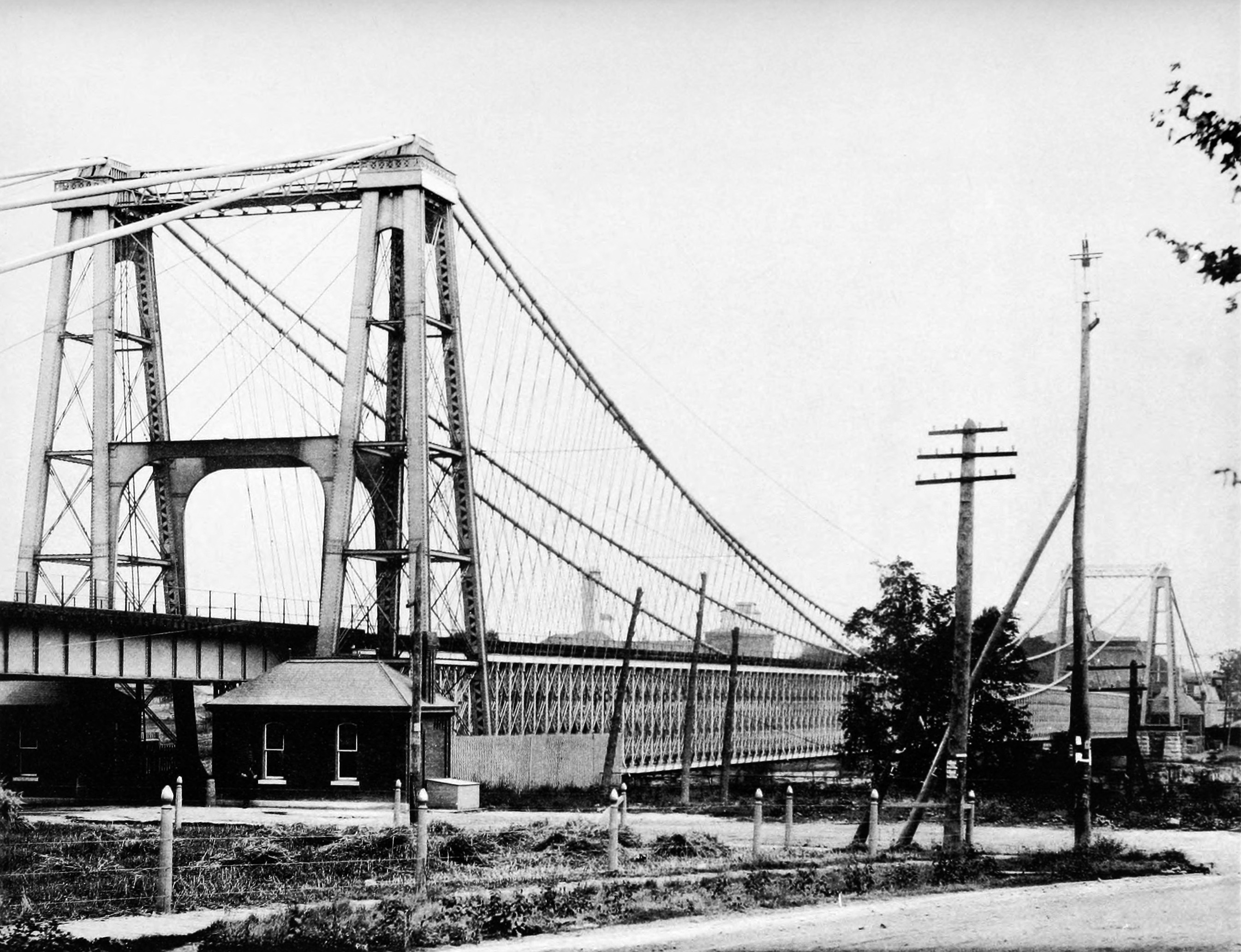
The Suspension Bridge in 1886, after its wooden components had been replaced with steel

Budget concerns forced Roebling to build the Suspension Bridge primarily with wood; the cost of casting the components out of iron and transporting them "[way] out West" was exorbitant. The organic material decayed and rotted because of the moisture present around Niagara Falls. As the industrialization of the United States moved forward rapidly, the introduction of the Bessemer process greatly lowered the cost of the more durable steel and iron. By 1880, the Suspension Bridge's wooden trusses, beams, and flooring were replaced with steel. The wire cables were not replaced; their cores were still in pristine condition, while the outer layer of wires were lightly corroded and had to be replaced. Due to severe deterioration, the limestone towers were replaced in 1886 with steel framed versions. These renovations increased the bridge's strength and helped it handle heavier loads for a few more years.

The weight of trains in North America had greatly increased by the mid-1890s. Larger and more powerful locomotives were required to pull cars that handled an increasing number of passengers and goods; compared to the 23-short-ton (21 t) locomotives crossing the bridge in the 1850s, 170-short-ton (150 t) locomotives were the common engines 40 years later. The weight of these trains exceeded the specifications of the Suspension Bridge, and the bridge companies took the opportunity to review and request the replacement of the bridge. Civil engineer Leffert L. Buck, who had been hired to maintain the Suspension Bridge, was selected to design the replacement bridge. He settled for a bridge of the arch design. At that time, arch bridges were the new models for railway bridges and were more cost-efficient than suspension bridges. Buck built the new bridge around and below the Suspension Bridge, replacing it one piece at a time. His plan allowed bridge traffic—train and pedestrian—to continue without disruption. By August 27, 1897, the last pieces of the Suspension Bridge were dismantled, leaving the Lower Steel Arch Bridge—later renamed the Whirlpool Rapids Bridge—in its stead. On inspection, the cores of the cables that formerly held up the Suspension Bridge were found to be as sound as on the day the bridge was built.

== Notes and references ==
=== Bibliography ===
==== Primary sources ====
- Buck, Leffert (December 13, 1880). Report on the Renewal of Niagara Suspension Bridge (Report). New York, United States: C. W. Ames & Co.
- Buck, Richard; Buck, Leffert (December 20, 1898). The Niagara Railway Arch: With Discussion. Self-published.
- Roebling, John (May 1, 1855). Final Report of John A. Roebling, Civil Engineer, to the Presidents and Directors of the Niagara Falls Suspension and Niagara Falls International Bridge Companies (Report). New York, United States: Steam Press of Les, Mann & Co. Archived from the original on April 25, 2009.
- Roebling, John (August 1, 1860). Report of John A. Roebling, Civil Engineer, to the Presidents and Directors of the Niagara Falls Suspension and Niagara Falls International Bridge Companies, on the Condition of the Niagara Railway Suspension Bridge (Report). New York, United States: Murphy and Bechtel. Archived from the original on March 1, 2024.

==== Secondary sources ====
- Baer, Christopher (March 2005). "PRR Chronology 1855" (PDF). Pennsylvania, United States: Pennsylvania Railroad Technical & Historical Society. Archived (PDF) from the original on February 25, 2009.
- Bianculli, Anthony (November 2003). "Bridges—Suspension Bridges". Trains and Technology: The American Railroad in the Nineteenth Century. Vol. 4. Delaware, United States: University of Delaware Press. ISBN 0-87413-803-5.
- Billington, David (1985) [1983]. "John Roebling and the Suspension Bridge". The Tower and the Bridge: The New Art of Structural Engineering. New Jersey, United States: Princeton University Press. ISBN 0-691-02393-X.
- Brightly, Frederick (1869). "New York—Collection Districts". An Analytical Digest of the Laws of the United States. Vol. 2. Philadelphia, United States: Kay & Brother. Archived from the original on March 1, 2024.
- Crabtree, Jerome (1901). "Iron and Steel Working". The Marvels of Modern Mechanism and Their Relations to Social Betterment. Vol. 1. Massachusetts, United States: The King-Richardson Company. Archived from the original on March 1, 2024.
- Disturnell, John (1864). The Traveler's Guide to the Hudson River, Saratoga Springs, Lake George, Falls of Niagara and Thousand Islands: Also, to the Green and White Mountains, and Other Parts of New England, Forming the Fashionable Northern Tour Through the United States and Canada. New York, United States: American News Company.
- Dubinsky, Karen (March 1999). "The People's Niagara at the Turn of the Century". The Second Greatest Disappointment: Honeymooning and Tourism at Niagara Falls. New Jersey, United States: Rutgers University Press. ISBN 1-896357-23-7. Archived from the original on March 1, 2024.
- Dumych, Daniel (July 1996). Niagara Falls. New Hampshire, United States: Arcadia Publishing. ISBN 0-7385-3736-5. Archived from the original on March 1, 2024.
- Gee, Denise Jewell (September 22, 2008). "Underground Railroad Expert Set to Develop Museum in Niagara Falls". The Buffalo News. New York, United States: Stanford Lipsey.
- Grant, John; Jones, Ray (June 1, 2006). "Suspended by Steel Ropes". Niagara Falls: An Intimate Portrait. Connecticut, United States: Globe Pequot. ISBN 0-7627-4025-6.
- Griggs, Francis (October 2006a). "Great Achievements—Charles Ellet, Jr". Structure. Illinois, United States: National Council of Structural Engineers Associations. ISSN 0969-2126. Archived from the original (PDF) on April 25, 2009.
- Griggs, Francis (November 2006b). "Great Achievements—John A. Roebling". Structure. Illinois, United States: National Council of Structural Engineers Associations. ISSN 0969-2126. Archived from the original (PDF) on April 25, 2009.
- Holley, George (1883). "Chapter XVI" (PDF). The Falls of Niagara with Supplementary Chapters on the Other Famous Cataracts of the World. New York, United States: A.C. Armstrong & Son. Archived from the original on May 11, 2008.
- Irwin, William (March 1996). "Bridge to a New Niagara". The New Niagara: Tourism, Technology, and the Landscape of Niagara Falls, 1776–1917. Pennsylvania, United States: Penn State University Press. ISBN 0-271-01593-4. Archived from the original on March 1, 2024.
- Kostoff, Robert (2008). "Suspension Bridge". Remembering Niagara: Tales from Beyond the Falls. South Carolina, United States: The History Press. ISBN 978-1-59629-451-6.
- MacKenzie, Mark (August 3, 2003). "Let's Go Drive a Kite". The Independent on Sunday. London, United Kingdom: Independent News & Media. Archived from the original on November 4, 2012 – via HighBeam Research.
- McCullough, David (June 2001) [1972]. The Great Bridge: The Epic Story of the Building of the Brooklyn Bridge (Classic ed.). New York, United States: Simon & Schuster. ISBN 0-7432-1737-3. Archived from the original on January 15, 2023.
- Merritt, Jedediah (1875). Biography of the Hon. W. H. Merritt, M. P.: Of Lincoln, District of Niagara, Including an Account of the Origin, Progress and Completion of Some of the Most Important Public Works in Canada. Ontario, Canada: E. S. Leavenworth.
- Middleton, William (May 2001). "A Bridge at the Narrowing". The Bridge at Québec. Indiana, United States: Indiana University Press. ISBN 0-253-33761-5.
- Nye, David (May 2, 1996) [1994]. American Technological Sublime (New ed.). Massachusetts, United States: MIT Press. ISBN 0-262-64034-1. Archived from the original on March 1, 2024.
- Pairpoint, Alfred (1857). "The Niagara Suspension-Bridge". Uncle Sam and His Country, or, Sketches of America, in 1854–55–56. London, United Kingdom: Simpkin, Marshall, and Company. ISBN 9780608407807. Archived from the original on March 1, 2024.
- Powell, James (1999). "Currency Reforms (1841–71)". A History of the Canadian Dollar (PDF). Ontario, Canada: Bank of Canada. ISBN 0-662-28123-3. Archived from the original on March 1, 2024.
- Reier, Sharon (September 8, 2000) [1977]. "Brooklyn Bridge". The Bridges of New York. New York, United States: Dover Publications. ISBN 0-486-41230-X. Archived from the original on March 1, 2024.
- Robertson, Joseph (January 25, 1851). "Niagara Suspension Bridge". The Mechanics' Magazine, Museum, Register, Journal and Gazette. 54 (1433). London, United Kingdom: Robertson and Company. Archived from the original on March 1, 2024.
- Robinson, Meg (2005). "The Kite that Bridged the Niagara". Niagara Falls, United States: Niagara International Kite Festival. Archived from the original on June 18, 2008.
- Ryerson, Egerton; Hodgins, John (1854). "The Niagara Suspension Bridge". The Journal of Education for Upper Canada. 8 (10). Toronto, Canada: Lovell and Gibson. Archived from the original on March 1, 2024.
- Scott, Richard (2001). In the Wake of Tacoma: Suspension Bridges and the Quest for Aerodynamic Stability. Reston, Virginia: ASCE Press. ISBN 0-7844-0542-5.
- Skempton, Alec; Chrimes, Mike (February 28, 2002). "Biographical Dictionary". A Biographical Dictionary of Civil Engineers in Great Britain and Ireland: 1500 to 1830. Vol. 1. London, United Kingdom: Thomas Telford. ISBN 0-7277-2939-X. Archived from the original on March 1, 2024.
- Strand, Ginger (2008). "The Other Side of Jordan". Inventing Niagara: Beauty, Power, and Lies. New York, United States: Simon & Schuster. ISBN 978-1-4165-4656-6.
- Switala, William (July 2006). "Operation of the Railroad". Underground Railroad in New Jersey and New York. Pennsylvania, United States: Stackpole Books. ISBN 0-8117-3258-4. Archived from the original on March 1, 2024.
- Talman, James (2000). "Merritt, William Hamilton". Dictionary of Canadian Biography Online. Canada. Archived from the original on April 26, 2009.
- Tesmer, Irving; Bastedo, Jerold (June 1981). "Operation of the Railroad". Colossal Cataract: The Geologic History of Niagara Falls. New York, United States: State University of New York Press. ISBN 0-87395-522-6. Archived from the original on March 1, 2024.
- Trachtenberg, Alan (July 15, 1979) [1965]. "An American Dream". Brooklyn Bridge: Fact and Symbol (Second ed.). Illinois, United States: University of Chicago Press. ISBN 0-226-81115-8.
- Troyano, Leonardo Fernández (September 22, 2003). Bridge Engineering: A Global Perspective. London, United Kingdom: Thomas Telford. ISBN 0-7277-3215-3.
- Tyrrell, Henry (1911). "Suspension Bridges". History of Bridge Engineering. Chicago, United States: Self-published. Archived from the original on March 1, 2024.
- White, Bob (2010). "Homan Walsh—Bridging the Niagara River Gorge With a Kite". Best Breezes. Ontario, Canada: Self-published. Archived from the original on August 17, 2010.
- Wilson, Ken (March 1990). Everybody's Heard of Blondin. Peterborough, United Kingdom: Pond View Books. ISBN 1-871044-35-9. Archived from the original on March 1, 2024.
