= Pont de Rennes bridge =

Bridge in Rochester, New York

Pont de Rennes Bridge
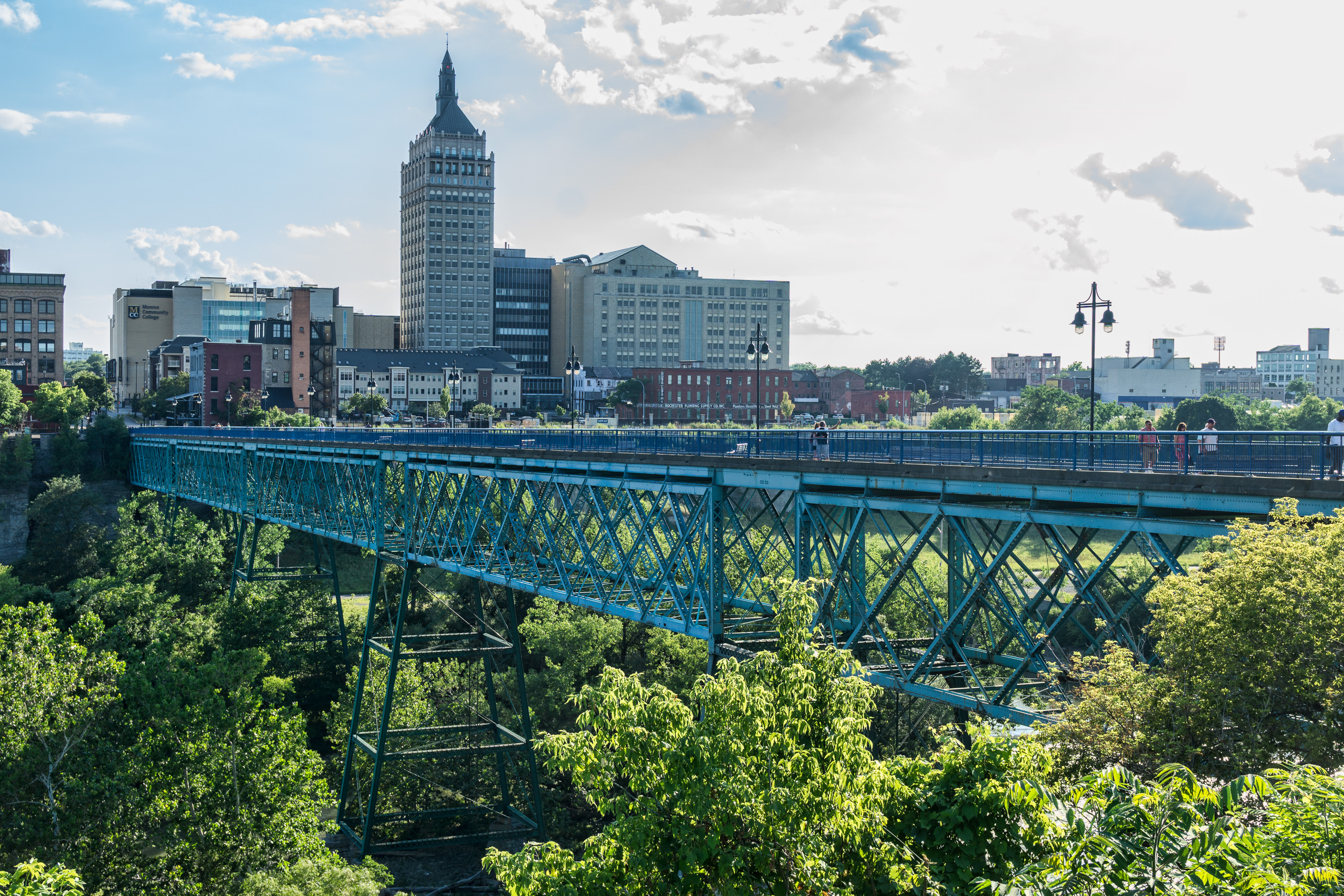
- Pont De Rennes with Kodak Tower in background
- Coordinates: 43.1627°N 77.6153°W
- Carries: Pedestrians and bicycles
- Crosses: Genesee River
- Locale: Rochester New York

Characteristics
- Design: Truss bridge
- Material: Steel
- Total length: 858 feet (262 m)

History
- Designer: Leffert L. Buck
- Opened: 1891

Location
- Interactive map of Pont de Rennes Bridge

The Pont de Rennes Bridge, originally the Platt Street Bridge, is a historic wrought iron pedestrian bridge spanning the Genesee River and Brown's Race in Rochester, New York. Built in 1891 by the Rochester Bridge and Iron Works to a design by engineer Leffert Lefferts Buck, the bridge is an 858-foot-long (262 m) metal 11-panel rivet-connected lattice (triple Warren) deck truss bridge standing 114 feet (35 m) above the river. Originally carrying vehicular traffic of Platt Street,, it was closed to automobiles after being deemed structurally unsafe and sat unused for approximately two decades before being converted to a pedestrian bridge in 1982 and renamed for Rochester's sister city of Rennes, France.

The bridge is a contributing structure within the Brown's Race Historic District, which was listed on the National Register of Historic Places in 1989. It is part of the Genesee Riverway Trail and provides views of High Falls, a 96-foot (29 m) waterfall on the Genesee River, and the surrounding gorge. Between 2023 and 2024, the bridge underwent a $18.7 million rehabilitation as part of the ROC the Riverway initiative, reopening on December 6, 2024.

== History ==
The bridge was designed by Leffert Buck, who also designed the Williamsburg Bridge in New York City. Buck designed the Platt Street Bridge relatively early in his career, six years before beginning work on the Williamsburg Bridge.

=== Construction and early use ===
The Platt Street Bridge was built in 1891 by the Rochester Bridge and Iron Works. It was designed by Leffert Lefferts Buck, a civil engineer who later designed the Williamsburg Bridge in New York City. The bridge was constructed of wrought iron and originally carried vehicular traffic, including horse-drawn wagons and later automobiles, across the Genesee River and Brown's Race.

=== Closure and conversion ===
The bridge was eventually deemed structurally unsafe for automobile traffic and was closed to vehicles. It sat vacant and unused for approximately two decades. In 1982, the bridge was converted to a pedestrian bridge and renamed "Pont de Rennes" in honor of Rochester's sister city relationship with Rennes, France. The conversion was part of the redevelopment of the High Falls area.

=== Rochester–Rennes sister city relationship ===
The sister city relationship between Rochester and Rennes dates to 1958 and was Rochester's first such partnership. The relationship originated at a White House conference in the fall of 1956 implementing President Dwight D. Eisenhower's "People-to-People" diplomacy program. A Charter of Twinning was signed by Rochester Mayor Peter Barry and Rennes Mayor Henri Freville. Rennes, the capital of Brittany, has a population of approximately 216,000.

=== 2023–2024 rehabilitation ===
On July 5, 2023, the bridge was closed to pedestrian traffic for structural repairs and renovation of the public space on top. It was reopened to the public on December 6, 2024.

The rehabilitation of the Pont de Rennes Bridge was carried out as part of the ROC the Riverway initiative, a program announced in February 2017 by Governor Andrew Cuomo with more than $100 million in committed state funding for improvements along the Genesee River corridor in Rochester. The bridge rehabilitation project was designed by a team that included Fisher Associates.

The project encompassed the reconstruction of the concrete deck, structural steel beam repairs, replacement of approximately 400 support towers, and the installation of new railings, overlook areas, lighting, public art, seating, landscaping, and a "selfie station." Rochester Mayor Malik Evans stated: "The improvements we have planned for Pont de Rennes at Brown's Race will make these areas even more pedestrian and business friendly while maintaining their historical integrity."

The bridge was closed for rehabilitation on July 5, 2023. The project's original budget was $14.6 million, but unforeseen repairs required for deteriorated steel beams increased the final cost to $18.7 million, an overrun of approximately $4.1 million. The bridge reopened on December 6, 2024, approximately 17 months after its closure, with a ribbon-cutting ceremony attended by city officials.

Within approximately five months of the bridge's December 2024 reopening, the green surface coating applied to the bridge deck during rehabilitation began peeling and chipping in roughly 40 areas. City officials characterized the damage as cosmetic and non-structural, stating that the repairs would be made at no cost to the city during the next construction season.

== Design ==
=== Structural configuration ===
The Pont de Rennes Bridge is a metal 11-panel rivet-connected lattice (triple Warren) deck truss bridge, fixed in configuration. It spans 858 feet (262 m) in total length and stands 114 feet (35 m) above the Genesee River. The bridge is constructed entirely of wrought iron.

=== Engineering significance ===
The bridge's triple intersection Warren truss configuration is notable because most American lattice trusses employ a quadruple intersection pattern; the triple intersection variety is rare. The bridge is additionally unusual as a deck truss variety of this configuration, further distinguishing it among surviving examples of 19th-century American truss bridge construction.

== Historic designations ==
The Pont de Rennes Bridge is listed on the National Register of Historic Places as a contributing structure within the Brown's Race Historic District, which was added to the Register in 1989. The bridge also has a Historical Marker Database entry (HMDB #55773).

== Brewery Line Trail ==
The Brewery Line Trail is a 1,200-foot (370 m) segment of trail connecting the High Falls Overlook to the Pont de Rennes Bridge. Completed at a cost of $1.1 million as part of the ROC the Riverway initiative, the trail opened on May 11, 2023. It forms part of the larger Genesee Riverway Trail.

== High Falls State Park ==
The Pont de Rennes Bridge has been identified as a "focal point" for the proposed High Falls State Park, which would be the first New York state park located within the City of Rochester. Governor Kathy Hochul announced $75 million in state funding for the approximately 40-acre (16 ha) park, with a framework plan prepared by the landscape architecture firm OLIN. Phased construction is expected to begin in late 2026.

== Events ==
The bridge serves as the venue for Greentopia's "Dinner on the Bridge," an annual gourmet fundraising dinner benefiting environmental and community projects in Rochester. The bridge and the adjacent High Falls area also host seasonal events, including the Genesee Brewery Keg Tree Lighting and bird walks organized by the Genesee Land Trust.

== Gallery ==
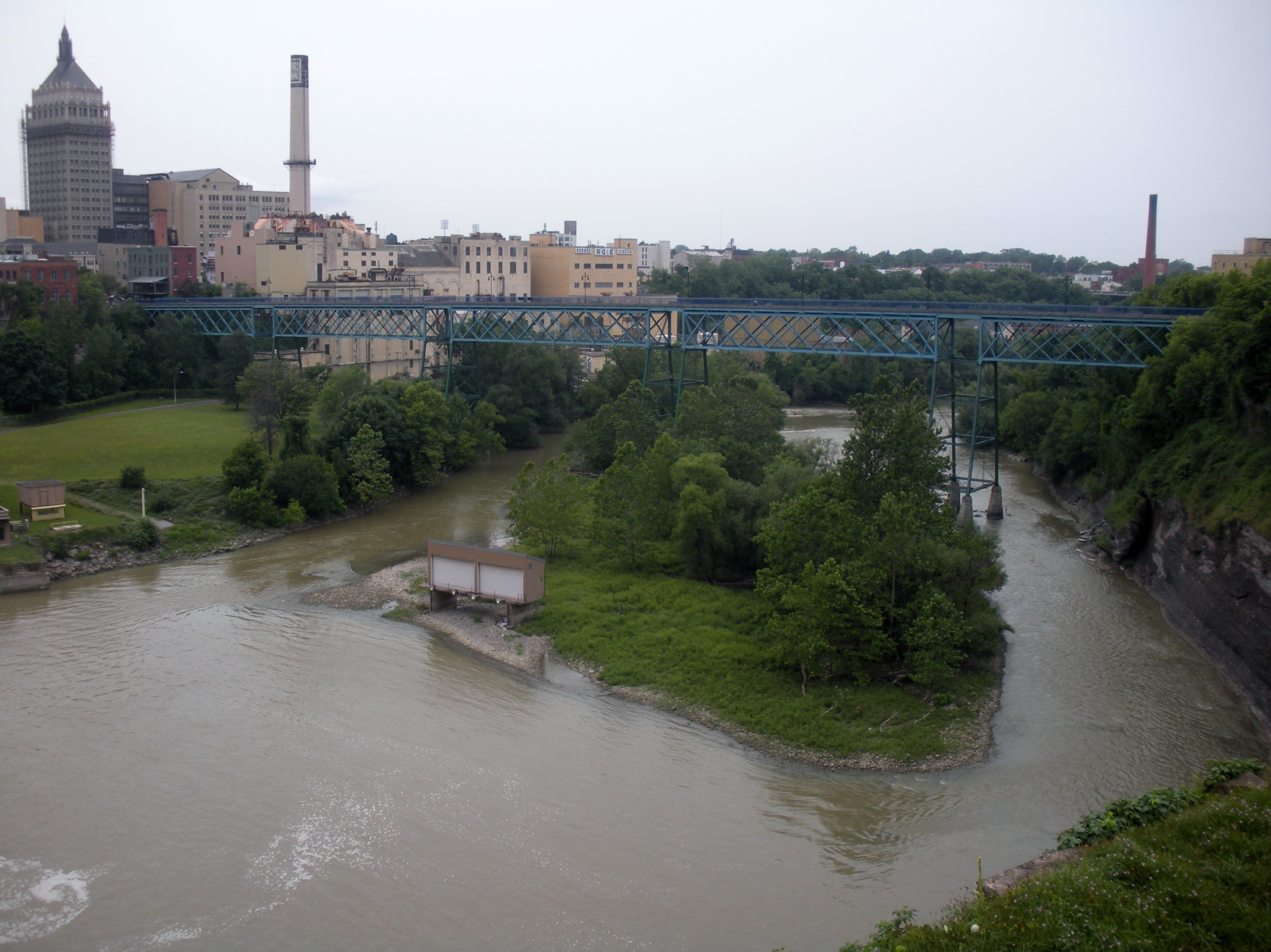
View of the bridge looking north

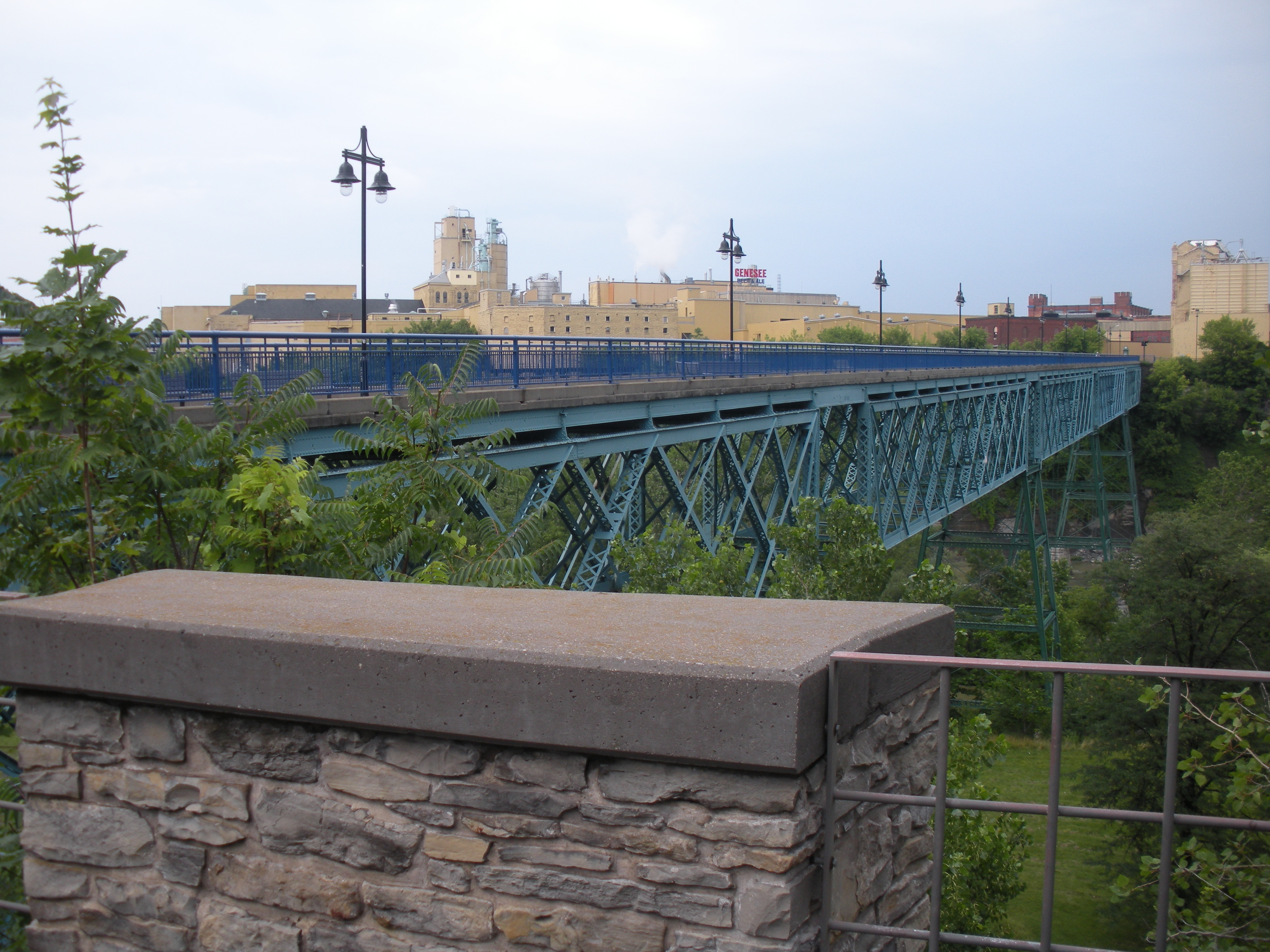

== See also ==
- Genesee River
- High Falls (Rochester, New York)
- Brown's Race Historic District
- Leffert Lefferts Buck
- Williamsburg Bridge
- Rennes
- National Register of Historic Places listings in Rochester, New York
