= Anthony Walton White =

United States Army general

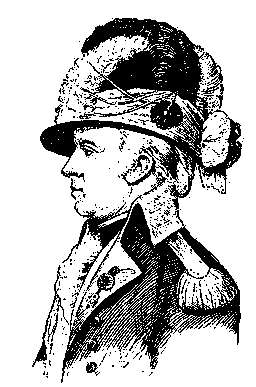

Personal details
- Born: July 7, 1750 New Brunswick, New Jersey
- Died: February 10, 1803 (aged 52) New Brunswick, New Jersey
- Spouse: Margaret Ellis (m. 1783)
- Children: Eliza Mary White
- Parent(s): Anthony White; Elizabeth Morris
- Relatives: Lewis Morris (grandfather); William Paterson (brother-in-law); Walton Evans (grandson)

Military service
- Allegiance: Continental Army
- Rank: Brigadier general
- Battles/wars: American Revolutionary War

Anthony Walton White (July 7, 1750 – February 10, 1803) was a brigadier general in the Continental Army during the American Revolutionary War who had previously served as an aide-de-camp to General George Washington.

== Early life ==
He was born on July 7, 1750, to Elizabeth Morris and Anthony White III in New Brunswick, New Jersey. His paternal great-grandfather, Anthony White I, was a royalist who, after the execution of Charles I, emigrated to Bermuda and became connected with the government of the islands of which his son, Anthony White II, and grandson, Leonard White, were chief justices.

White's father, Anthony White III, moved to the United States from Bermuda and married Elizabeth Morris, the daughter of Governor Lewis Morris, a governor of New Jersey. His elder sister, Euphemia White, was the second wife of William Paterson. White received his education under the immediate direction of his father.

== Career ==
At the age of twenty-five, his time was employed in study and in assisting his father in the management of his large estates.

=== Revolutionary War ===
In October 1775, he obtained a commission as major and aide-de-camp to General George Washington. After less than a month, he was dismissed by Washington for not being ready enough with his pen and being unsuited for clerical work. On February 9, 1776, White was commissioned by the Continental Congress as the lieutenant colonel of the 3rd New Jersey Regiment. He fought at the Battle of Monmouth, with his dragoons taking the lead as the most advanced scouting parties in the morning offensive. When the 16th Queens Light Dragoons spotted White's units and charged, the American dragoons led the British horsemen into a trap formed by the infantry formations of Butler and Jackson, who killed several British dragoons and forced the rest into a disorderly retreat.

White was actively engaged in the service in the North until 1780, being successively appointed Lieutenant Colonel of the 4th Continental Light Dragoons in the Continental army, February 13, 1777, lieutenant colonel commandant of the 1st Continental Light Dragoons, December 10, 1779, and colonel, February 16, 1780. At that time, he was ordered by General Washington to take command of all the cavalry in the southern army, and, upon his own personal credit, equipped two regiments with which to operate against Lord Cornwallis in South Carolina.

On May 6, 1780, with the remnant of Major Benjamin Huger's cavalry, he crossed the Santee River and captured a small party of British, but while waiting at Lanneau's Ferry to recross the river, he was surprised and defeated by Col. Banastre Tarleton. White and many of his troops were taken prisoner. In 1781 he was ordered to join the army under Lafayette in Virginia, and on his march to that state had several successful encounters with Colonel Tarleton.

On May 21, 1782, White was present with General Anthony Wayne in the movement before Savannah; and, on the evacuation of that place, returned to Charleston, South Carolina, where he became security for the debts of the officers and men of his regiments, who were in want of almost all the necessaries of life. These debts he was subsequently obliged to pay at enormous sacrifices of his own property, and, on returning to the North at the close of the war, his financial ruin was completed by entering into speculation at the persuasion of military friends.

=== Post-war life ===
In 1793, White moved from New York, where he had resided for about ten years, back to New Brunswick, New Jersey. In 1794, he was appointed by President Washington as a brigadier general of cavalry in the expedition against the insurgents of the Whiskey Rebellion, serving under General Henry Lee.

== Personal life ==
In 1783, he married Margaret Ellis. Together, they had a daughter, Eliza Mary White, who later married Thomas M. Evans.

He died on February 10, 1803, at age 52, and was buried at Christ Church Episcopal Churchyard in New Brunswick, New Jersey.

His gravestone stated, "Brig. Gen. Anthony Walton White, who departed this life on the 10th of February, 1803, in the 53rd year of his age, rests beneath this monumental stone. He was an affectionate husband, a tender parent, a sincere friend, a zealous and inflexible patriot, and a faithful, active and gallant officer in the army of the United States during the Revolutionary War."

=== Descendants ===
White's grandson, Anthony Walton White Evans (1817–1886), was a civil engineer who worked on railroad and canal commissions in North and South America during the mid-nineteenth century.
