= Whirlpool Rapids Bridge =

Bridge in Ontario and New York

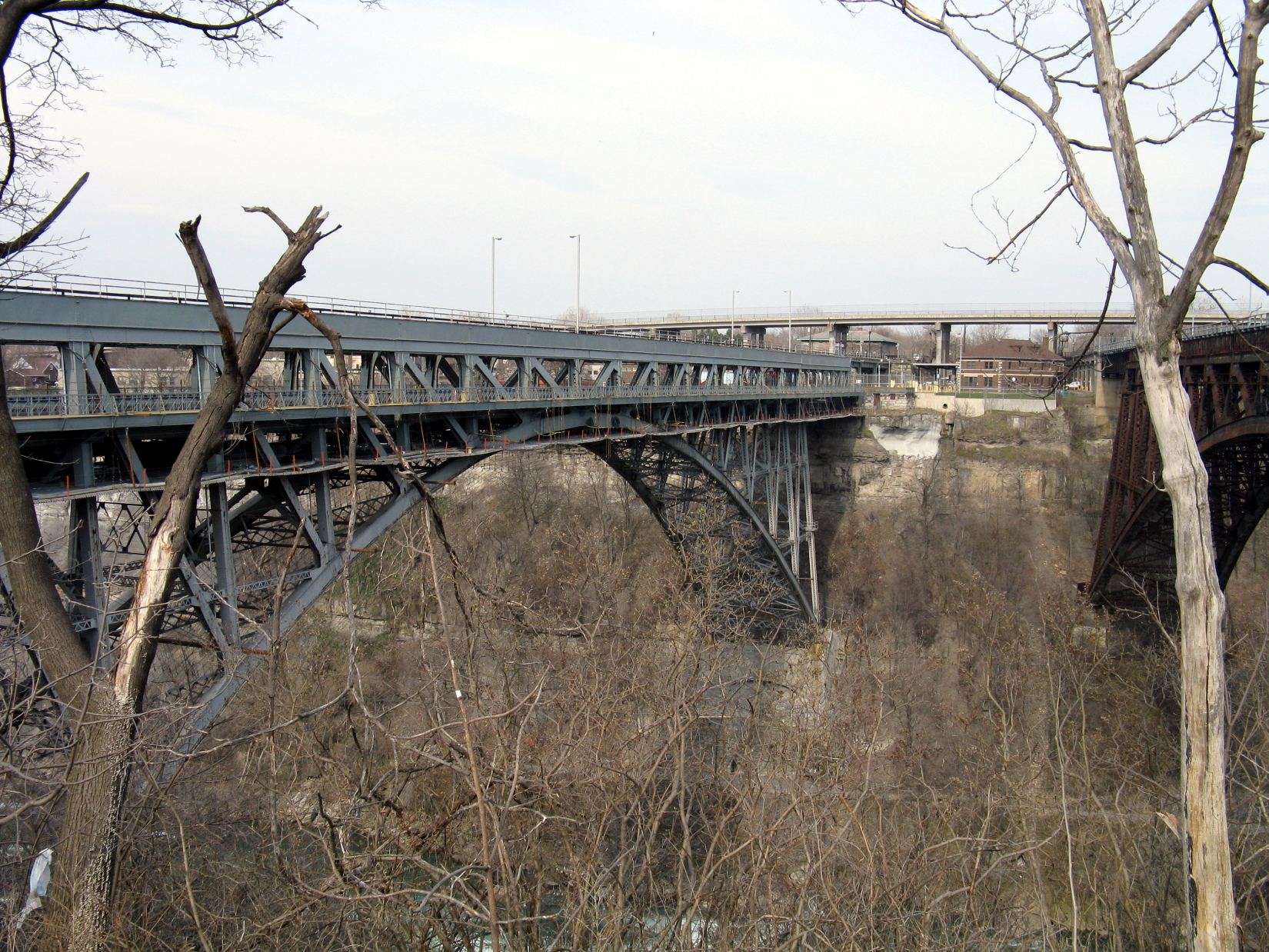
- Whirlpool Rapids Bridge (left) with out-of-service Michigan Central Railway Bridge (far right). A since-removed viaduct of the Niagara Scenic Parkway is also visible in the distance.
- Coordinates: 43.109208°N 79.058336°W
- Carries: 2 auto lanes (lower); 1 rail line (upper)
- Crosses: Niagara River
- Locale: Niagara Falls, Ontario, and Niagara Falls, New York
- Named for: Niagara Whirlpool
- Maintained by: Niagara Falls Bridge Commission; Amtrak (rail deck)

Characteristics
- Design: Arch bridge
- Total length: 329 metres (1,079.40 ft)
- Width: 16.9 metres (55.45 ft) (lower); 10 metres (32.81 ft) (upper)
- Longest span: 167.6 metres (549.87 ft)
- Clearance above: 3.96 metres (12.99 ft) (lower)
- Clearance below: 68.6 metres (225.07 ft)

History
- Opened: 1897

Statistics
- Daily traffic: 543 (2006)
- Toll: Canada-bound only: $6.00 USD / $8.50 CAD per passenger vehicle (via prepaid account linked to NEXUS card or E-ZPass payment)

Location
- Interactive map of Whirlpool Rapids Bridge

The Whirlpool Rapids Bridge, commonly known as the Whirlpool Bridge or the Lower Steel Arch Bridge (before 1937), is a spandrel braced, riveted, two-hinged arch bridge that crosses the Canada–United States border, connecting Niagara Falls, Ontario, and Niagara Falls, New York. The bridge currently carries the Amtrak–Via Rail Maple Leaf train service on its upper deck, and a roadway only for NEXUS members on its lower deck.

This bridge is located approximately 1.5 kilometres (0.9 mi) north of the Rainbow Bridge and about 2 kilometres (1.2 mi) from the Falls. It was acquired by the Niagara Falls Bridge Commission in January 1959. Immediately upstream is the similar arch-style Michigan Central Railway Bridge, which has been out of service since 2001.

== History ==
=== Construction ===
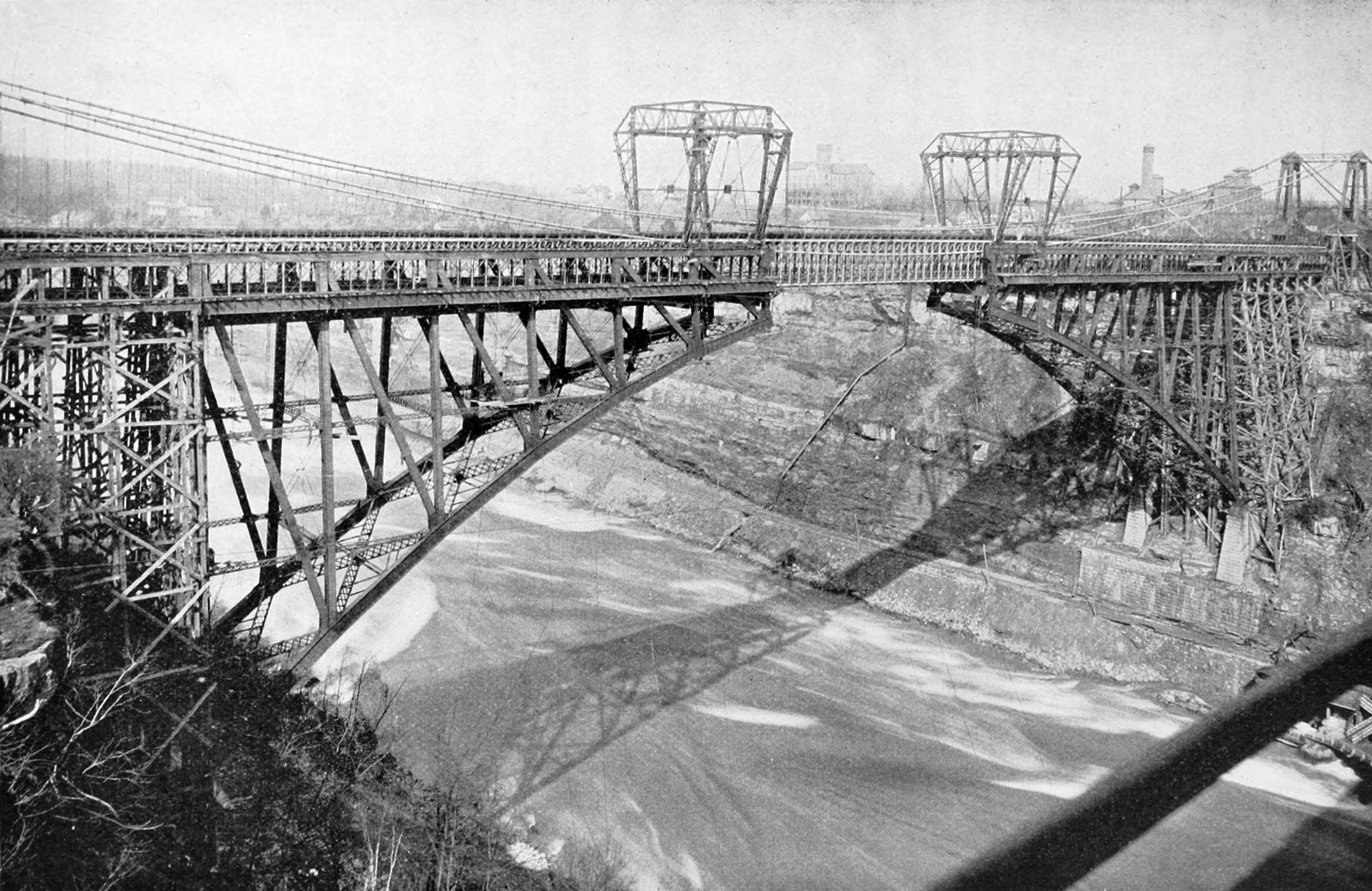
Bridge construction

The predecessor of the Whirlpool Rapids Bridge was the Niagara Falls Suspension Bridge, which carried foot and rail traffic, opened in 1855, and was most notable for being the world's first working railway suspension bridge and for being the bridge that was used by abolitionists running the Underground Railroad to get slaves to freedom in Canada. By the late 1800s, the suspension bridge was becoming outdated for railroad needs. The weight of trains in North America had greatly increased by the mid-1890s. Larger and more powerful locomotives were required to pull cars that handled an increasing number of passengers and goods; compared to the 23-short-ton (21 t) locomotives crossing the bridge in the 1850s, 170-short-ton (150 t) locomotives were the common engines 40 years later. The weight of these trains exceeded the specifications of the Suspension Bridge and the bridge companies decided to request the replacement of the bridge.

Civil engineer Leffert L. Buck, who had been hired to maintain the Suspension Bridge, was selected to design the replacement bridge. He settled for a bridge of the arch design. Buck built the new bridge around and below the Suspension Bridge and started building the foundation in April 1896. His plan allowed bridge traffic—train and pedestrian—to continue without disruption. By August 27, 1897, the last pieces of the Suspension Bridge were dismantled, leaving the Lower Steel Arch Bridge—later renamed the Whirlpool Rapids Bridge—in its stead. Steel towers and framework supporting the project were removed once it was completed. At the time of completion, it was the longest arch bridge ever built (168 meters across). Bridge materials for the former suspension bridge were then recycled by the Pennsylvania Steel Company.

=== Operation ===
While the Niagara Cantilever Bridge was nearby, it only served rail traffic for Canada Southern and Michigan Central Railway companies. Over the years, the New York Central Railroad, Great Western Railway, Erie Railroad, Canadian National Railway, and Amtrak have used the whirlpool bridge. In November 2009, the bridge was extensively refurbished: repairing and replacing the catwalk and some of the steel beams and rivets, sandblasting, and a paint job were among the major maintenance tasks undertaken. Amtrak took over maintenance responsibility of the rail deck from Canadian National (CN) in late 2012. Currently the Maple Leaf train service, jointly operated by Amtrak and Via Rail, is the only train to use the bridge; CN routes freight over the International Railway Bridge at Fort Erie, Ontario–Buffalo, New York instead.

== Description ==
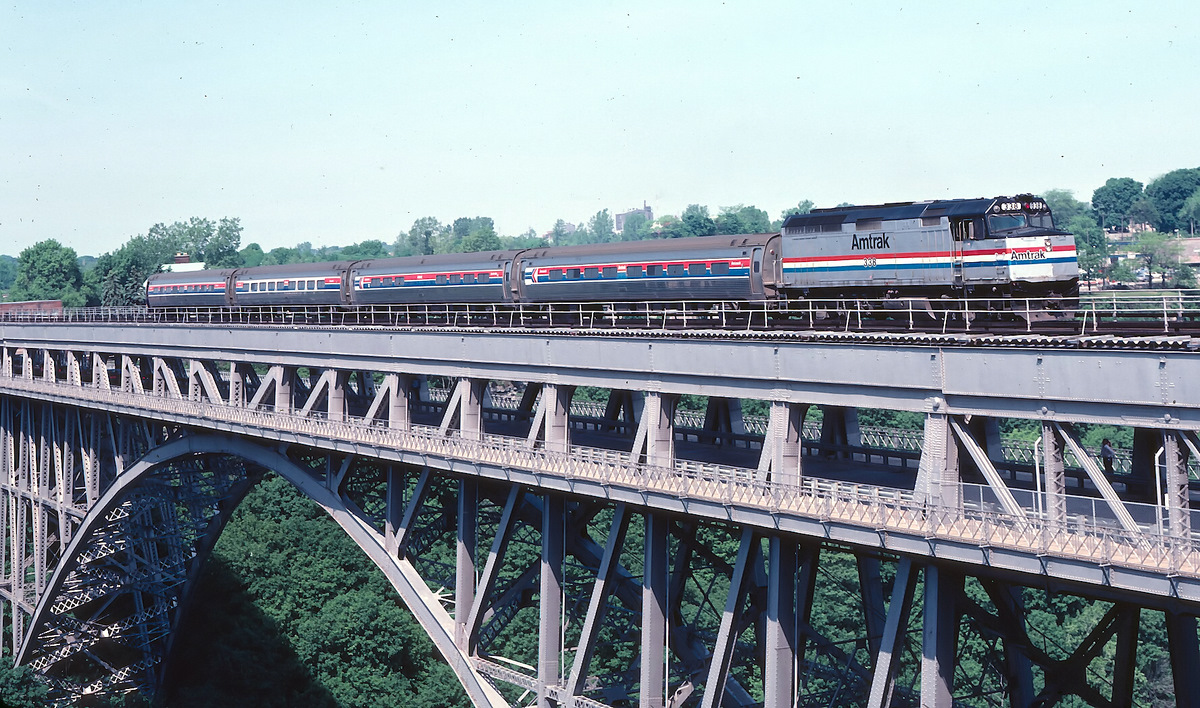
The Maple Leaf crosses the Whirlpool Rapids Bridge over the Niagara River (1983).

The bridge has two decks. The upper deck carried two tracks worth of railway traffic until 1963 when one of the tracks was removed. The remaining track is used exclusively by Amtrak trains for the Maple Leaf international train service between Toronto and New York City. The Via Rail Niagara Falls station is immediately located on the Canadian side of the bridge in Niagara Falls, Ontario and the Amtrak Niagara Falls station is immediately located on the American side of the bridge in Niagara Falls, New York.

In 1967, the wood used for the lower deck was replaced with asphalt. This track now only serves passenger vehicles—commercial vehicles and pedestrians are prohibited. Additionally, it may only be used by members of the NEXUS program, jointly operated by the Canada Border Services Agency (CBSA) and United States Customs and Border Protection (CBP), or by individuals entering the United States with a valid Global Entry card. Vehicles entering Canada must pay a $6.00 USD / $8.50 CAD toll electronically using an account linked to their E-ZPass transponder or NEXUS card. There is one lane of traffic to the United States and one lane to Canada, with two inspection lanes at each end for traffic entering the respective countries. The American side connects to New York State Route 104 and New York State Route 182, while the Canadian side connects to the historic terminus of Highway 3A, Highway 8 and Highway 20, now known as River Road and Bridge Street.

== See also ==
- List of crossings of the Niagara River
- List of reference routes in New York
- List of bridges in Canada
- List of bridges in the United States by height
- List of international bridges in North America
