= Brown's Race Historic District =

Historic district in New York, United States

- U.S. National Register of Historic Places
- U.S. Historic district
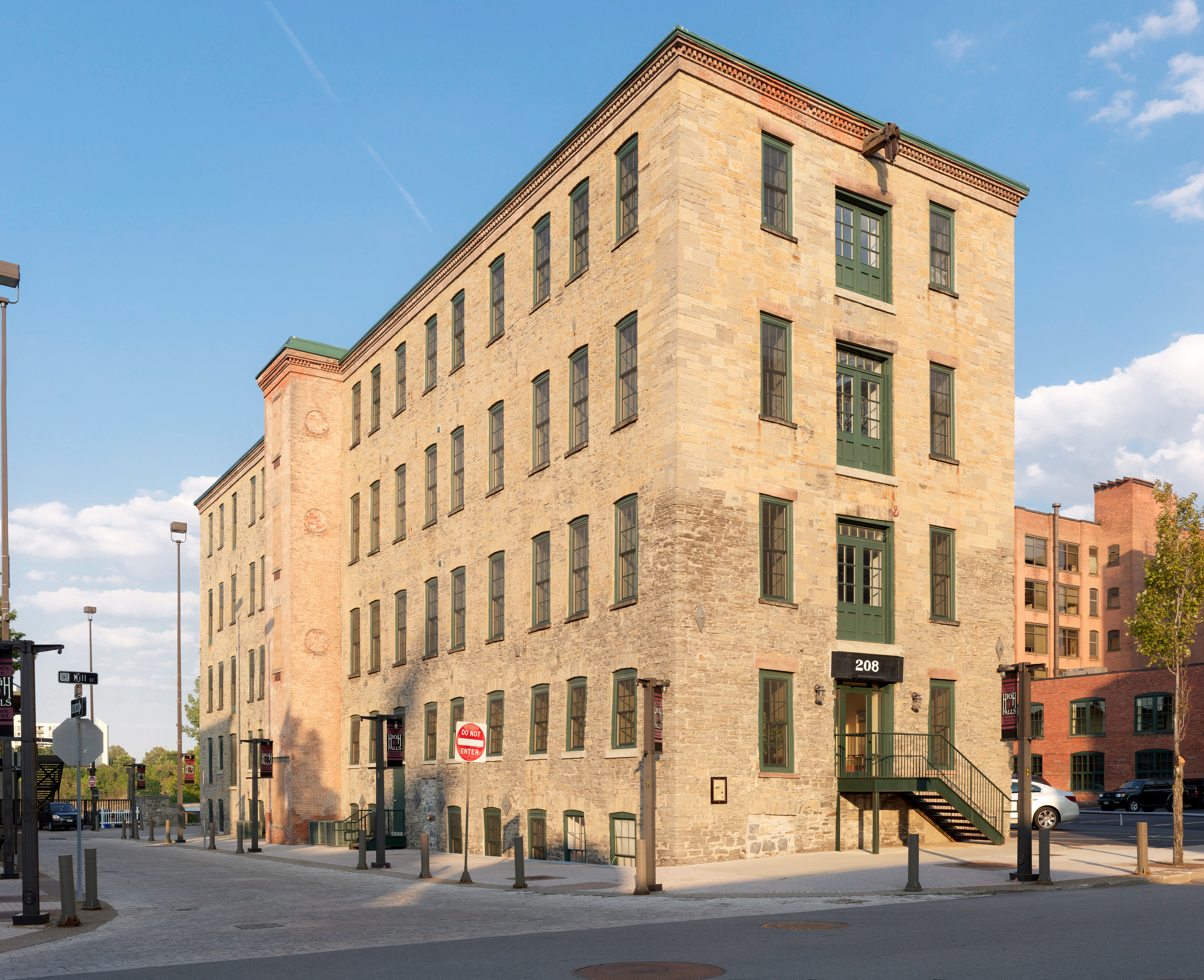
- The Parazin Building in the Brown's Race Historic District, September 2012

- Location within New York Location within the United States
- Location: Brown's Race St. from Platt St. to Conrail railroad tracks, Rochester, New York
- Coordinates: 43°9′38″N 77°36′59″W
- Area: 11 acres (4.5 ha)
- Architectural style: Second Empire, Romanesque
- NRHP reference No.: 89000067
- Added to NRHP: March 2, 1989

Brown's Race Historic District is a national historic district located at Rochester in Monroe County, New York. The district contains 15 contributing buildings, 2 contributing structures, and 14 contributing sites. All of the principal buildings are used for commercial purposes and are sited along or near the curving south rim of the Genesee River gorge at the rim of the High Falls. The district comprises a collection of 19th-century industrial buildings built of brick and stone, and ranging in size from one- to six-stories. Also in the district is the mill race and the 19th century iron Pont De Rennes bridge, which is used today as a pedestrian bridge and viewing platform of the High Falls and surrounding gorge.

It was listed on the National Register of Historic Places in 1989.

== Gallery ==
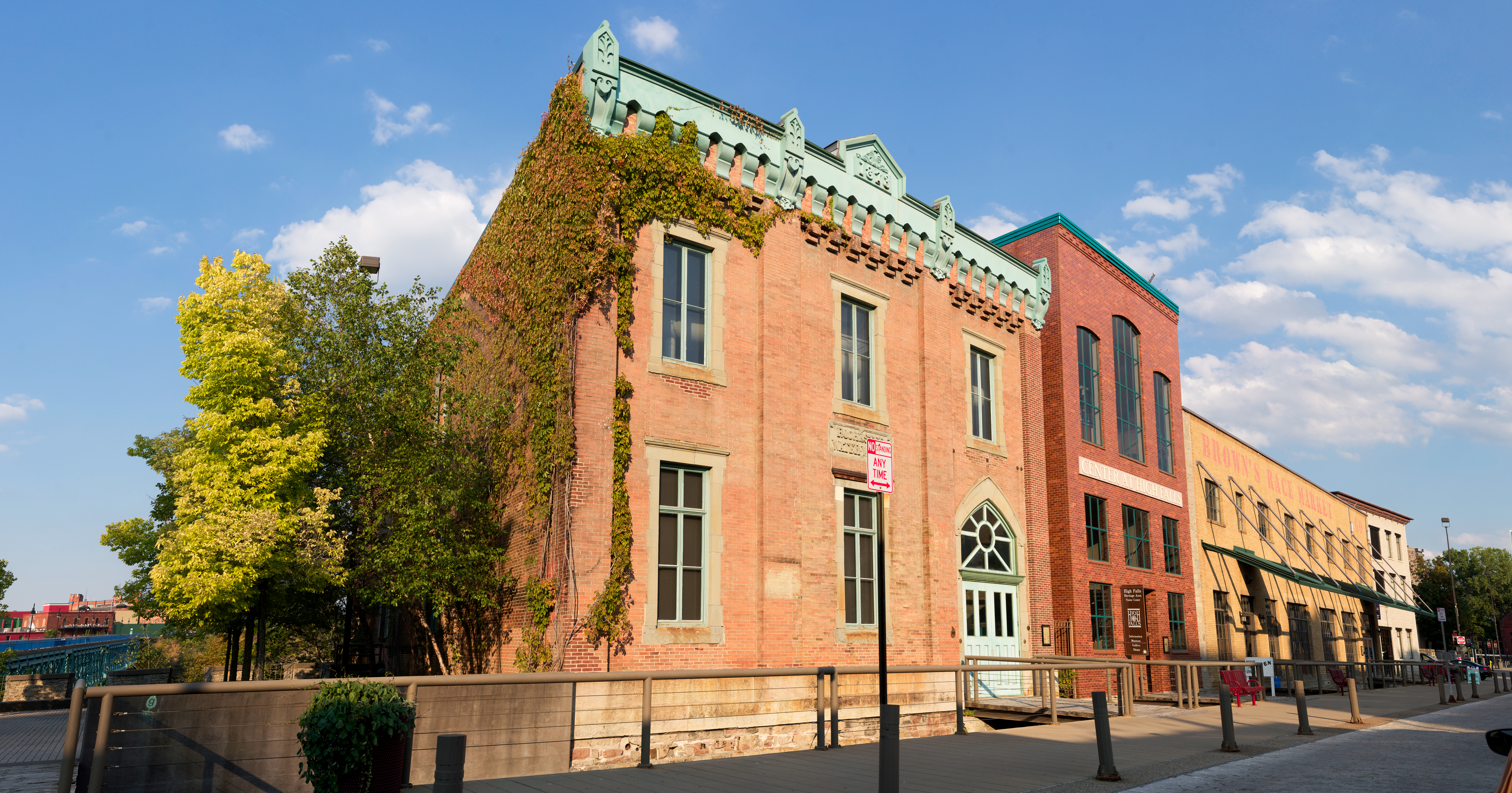
Buildings on the East side of Mill Street in the Brown's Race Historic District

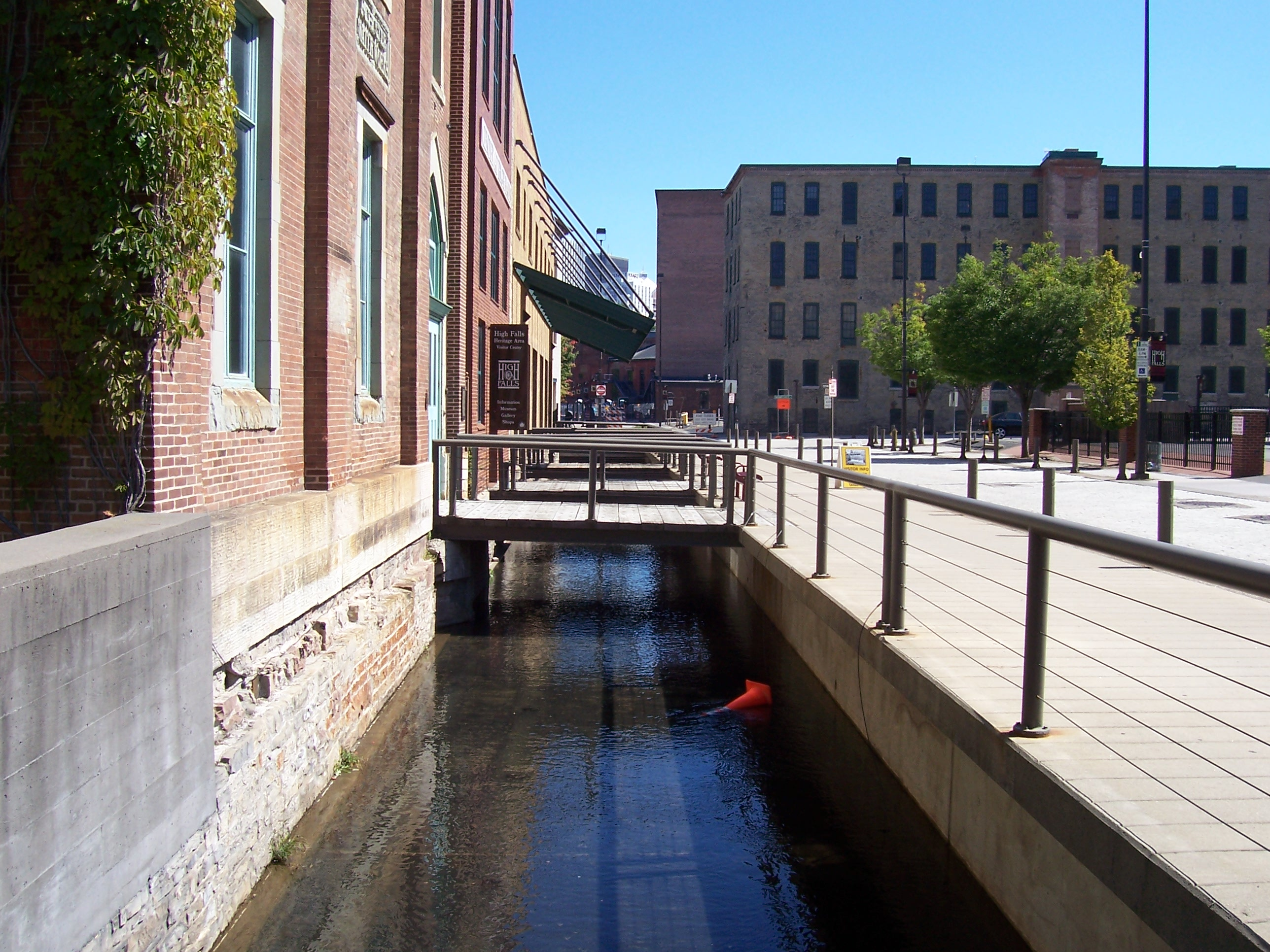
The Brown's mill race.

== See also ==
- National Register of Historic Places listings in Rochester, New York
