= Verrugas Bridge =

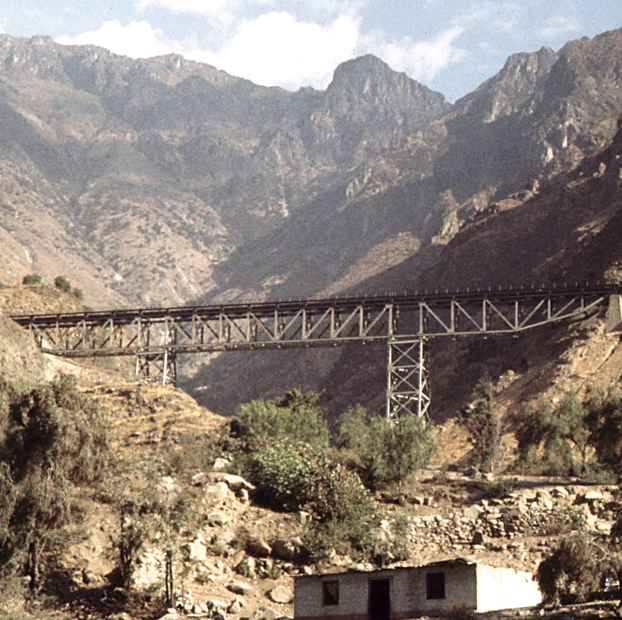
- Coordinates: 11°53′22″S 76°29′15″W
- Carries: The Callao, Lima & Oroya Railway
- Crosses: Verrugas Canyon
- Locale: Peru

Characteristics
- Total length: 175 metres (574 ft)
- Clearance below: 77 metres (253 ft)

History
- Constructed by: Cleveland Bridge & Engineering Company
- Construction start: 1934
- Construction end: 1936
- Opened: 1936

Location
- Interactive map of Verrugas Bridge

The Verugas Bridge is a bridge in Peru. It has a height of 253 feet and is 574 feet in length.

== History ==
The first bridge - a wrought iron viaduct - was designed by Leffert L. Buck and completed in January 1873. In March 1889, after a heavy flood, the first bridge collapsed and a second bridge - a cantilever design - also designed by Leffert L. Buck was completed in January 1891. The second bridge was destroyed by another flood in January 1934 and a third bridge was completed by Cleveland Bridge & Engineering Company two years later.

== Sources ==
- Khaled, Mahmoud (2009). Mahmoud, Khaled (ed.). Safety and reliability of bridge structures. CRC Press. doi:10.1201/9780203861585. ISBN 978-0-415-56484-7.
