= High Falls (Rochester, New York) =

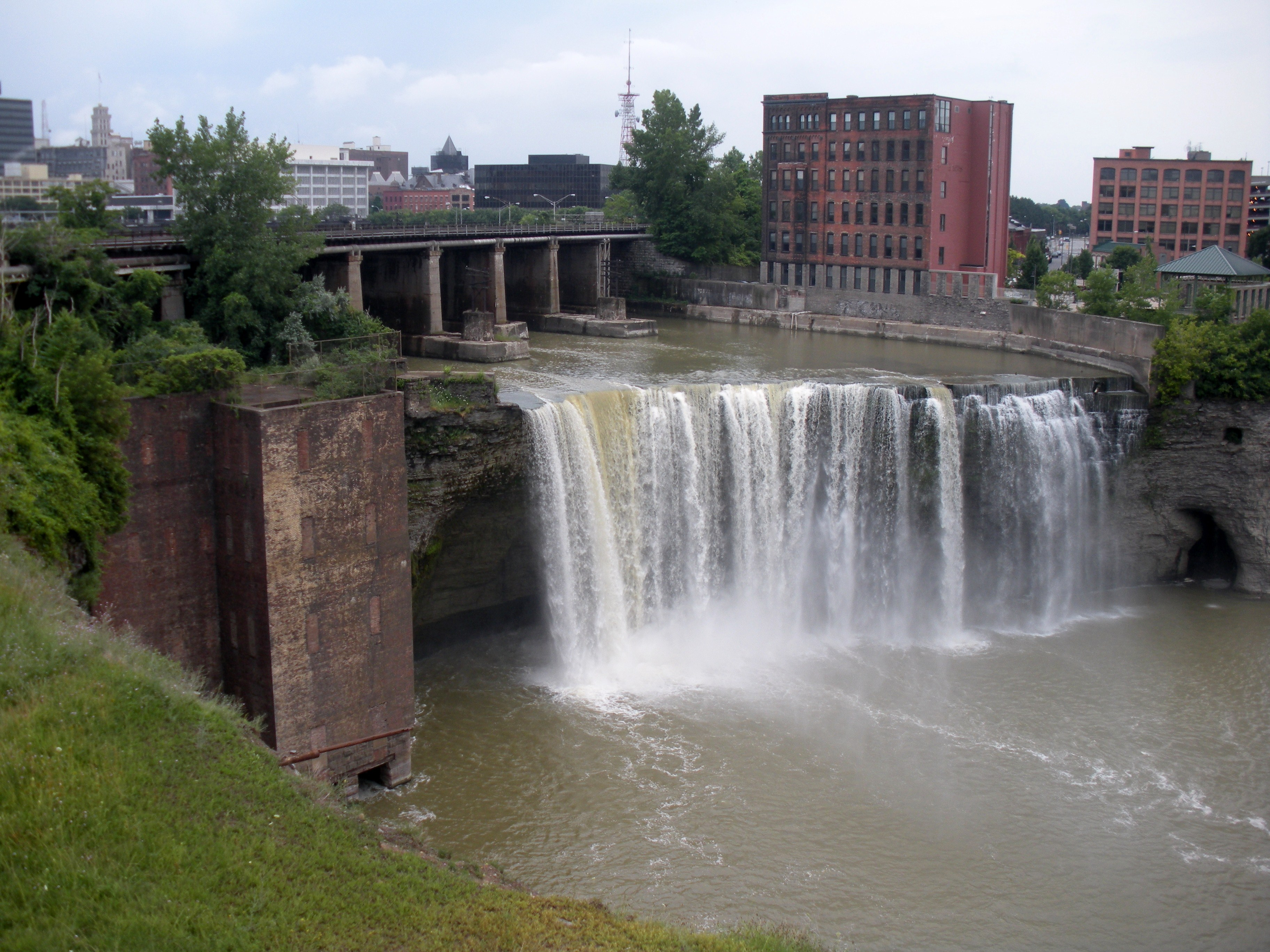
- View from Pont De Rennes bridge, Rochester, New York.
- Interactive map of High Falls
- Location: Rochester (New York, United States)
- Coordinates: 43.1615°N 77.6135°W
- Type: Cataract
- Total height: 96 ft (29 m)
- Number of drops: 1
- Watercourse: Genesee River

The High Falls or Upper Falls is a waterfall on the Genesee River in the city of Rochester, New York. They are one of three waterfalls within the city; the Middle and Lower Falls are about 2 miles (3.2 km) downstream. The High Falls area was the site of much of Rochester's early industrial development, where industry was powered by falling water. Brown's Race diverts water from above the falls and was used to feed various flour mills and industries; today the water is used to produce hydroelectric power.

The High Falls may be viewed from the Pont De Rennes bridge, a pedestrian bridge that spans the Genesee River a few hundred feet from the base of the falls.

The High Falls were the site of the final jump of "The Yankee Leaper" Sam Patch who died after jumping off of the High Falls in 1829.

An abstract representation of the High Falls was used on the logo of Rochester New York FC as a symbol of the city.

== High Falls State Park ==
In October 2025, Governor Kathy Hochul announced a framework plan for a proposed 40-acre state park centered on High Falls, which would be the first New York state park within the City of Rochester. The plan includes more than 2.5 miles of trails along both sides of the Genesee River gorge, providing public access to the falls area for the first time in over a century. Construction is expected to begin in late 2026, pending environmental remediation of former industrial properties along the river.

== See also ==
- List of waterfalls
