= Victorian Railways D class (1876) =

Class of Australian 4-4-0 locomotives

Victorian Railways D class "Rodgers"
- Rogers D class 4-4-0 No. 162, was the first American built locomotive imported by an Australasian colony.
Type and origin
- Power type: Steam
- Builder: Rogers Locomotive Works, New Jersey, USA
- Serial number: 2448, 2450
- Build date: 1876
- Total produced: 2
Specifications
- Configuration
  - Whyte: 4-4-0
- Gauge: 5 ft 3 in (1,600 mm)
- Leading dia.: 26 in (0.660 m)
- Driver dia.: 5 ft (1.524 m)
- Wheelbase: 40 ft 1.5 in (12.230 m)
- Axle load: 10 long tons 15 cwt (24,100 lb or 10.9 t)
- Loco weight: 33 long tons 6 cwt (74,600 lb or 33.8 t)
- Tender weight: 24 long tons 1 cwt (53,900 lb or 24.4 t)
- Total weight: 57 long tons 7 cwt (128,500 lb or 58.3 t)
- Fuel type: Coal
- Fuel capacity: 70 long cwt (7,800 lb or 3,600 kg)
- Water cap.: 2,031 imp gal (9,230 L; 2,439 US gal)
- Heating surface
  - Firebox: 88.52 sq ft (8.224 m^{2})
  - Tubes: 879.52 sq ft (81.710 m^{2})
  - Total surface: 968 sq ft (90 m^{2})
- Cylinders: 2, outside
- Cylinder size: 17 in × 24 in (432 mm × 610 mm)
- Valve gear: Stephenson
Performance figures
- Tractive effort: 11,560 lbf (51.4 kN) at 100 psi
Career
- Operators: Victorian Railways
- Number in class: 2
- Numbers: 162, 164
- Official name: Neil, Neil's Sister
- First run: 7 August 1877
- Disposition: Both scrapped

The D class of 1876 was the first example of American-built locomotives to be used on Victorian Railways, and among the first such engines to operate in Australia.

Both examples were scrapped.
