= Meadowsweet (restaurant) =

Restaurant in Brooklyn, New York

- Interactive map of Meadowsweet

Restaurant information
- Established: 2014
- Head chef: Polo Dobkin
- Rating: (2015 - 2021)
- Location: 149 Broadway, Williamsburg, New York City, New York, 11211
- Coordinates: 40°42′37.4″N 73°57′47.4″W
- Website: www.meadowsweetnyc.com

Meadowsweet is a restaurant in the Williamsburg neighborhood of Brooklyn in New York City.

== History and offerings ==
=== History ===
The restaurant replaced contemporary American establishment Dressler, which closed in 2013 after seven years in business. Husband and wife Polo Dobkin and Stephanie Lempert own Meadowsweet. Dobkin was the executive chef at Dressler, though he left the restaurant in 2012 to start his own establishment. Dobkin did not find a space he found appealing after leaving, and when Dressler closed he signed a 20-year lease for the space. Dobkin also found the space attractive in part due to foot traffic from the Williamsburg Bridge.

=== Menu ===
The restaurant's menus draw inspiration from Mediterranean cuisine.

== Reviews and accolades ==
The restaurant earned a Michelin star in 2015. Dressler had previously received a star while Dobkin was executive chef.

== See also ==
- List of Michelin-starred restaurants in New York City
