= History of congestion pricing in New York City =

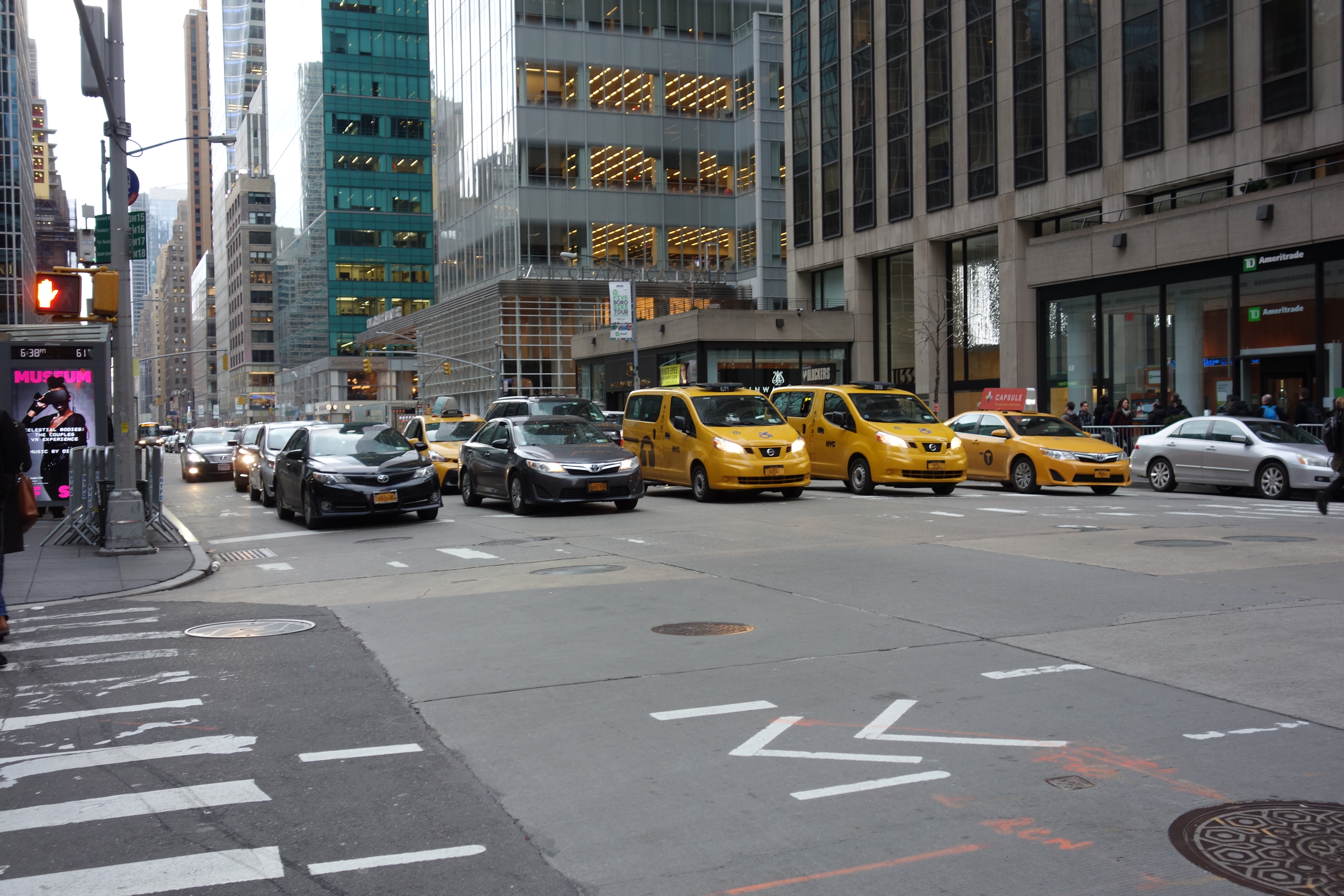
44th Street and Sixth Avenue in Midtown Manhattan

Plans for reducing vehicular traffic in New York City's central business districts, as well as adding tolls to crossings into Manhattan, date to the early 20th century.

A recurring proposal was adding tolls to all crossings of the East River, which separates New York City's Manhattan borough from the city's boroughs of Brooklyn and Queens. In the 1970s, after New York City was deemed to be in violation of the Clean Air Act, Mayor John Lindsay proposed limiting cars in Lower Manhattan and tolling all crossings of the East River, but ultimately withdrew the proposal. Lindsay's successor Abraham Beame subsequently opposed the tolling scheme. Beame's successor Ed Koch attempted to restore limits on vehicles entering Manhattan, but the federal government preempted his plan. New York City was judged to be compliant with the Clean Air Act in 1981.

Through the 1980s and 1990s, other proposals to limit congestion in Manhattan's business district stagnated. A congestion pricing plan was proposed in 2007 by Mayor Michael Bloomberg as a component of PlaNYC, his strategic plan for the city. However, the proposal stalled in the New York State Assembly. A congestion toll was again proposed in response to the 2017 New York City transit crisis of the MTA and ultimately implemented in 2025.

== Early plans ==
Many proposals involved adding tolls to the Brooklyn, Manhattan, Williamsburg, and Queensboro Bridges across the East River, which separates Long Island from the island of Manhattan. These bridges originally had tolls, but these were removed before the Great Depression. In 1933, in the midst of the Depression, the New York City Comptroller proposed reinstating tolls on the bridges in order to raise money for the city. This received opposition from residents of Brooklyn and Queens, in western Long Island, because the four free bridges were the only means of traveling freely to and from Long Island by automobile. Civic groups also opposed the proposal. In June 1933, Mayor John P. O'Brien acquiesced to a plan to charge city residents annual fees for any vehicles they owned, and to add a surcharge to all taxi trips. Out-of-town residents would pay tolls to cross the East and Harlem Rivers on the east side of Manhattan; since motorists already paid tolls to cross the Hudson River on the west side of Manhattan, this plan would have effectively created a congestion charge to enter and exit Manhattan. Several groups came together to protest against O'Brien's proposal, and his successor Fiorello H. La Guardia canceled O'Brien's proposed traffic fees when he entered office the next year.

In 1952, city planner Goodhue Livingston suggested that tolls be added on the four free East River bridges in order to fund the New York City Subway. By 1966, New York City Mayor John Lindsay was considering implementing tolls on all East River crossings, as well as raising prices on existing tolled crossings. In 1968, an outgoing member of the then-new Metropolitan Transportation Authority, which controlled New York City's transit system as well as the city's tolled crossings, suggested adding tolls to the East River crossings in order to encourage mass transit use. The proposal was brought up again in 1971.

In 1970, the government enacted the Clean Air Act, a series of federal air pollution regulations. Since New York City was in violation of these new regulations, it was given until 1975 to be compliant; this was later pushed back to 1977 after the state was given a two-year delay in implementing the standards. Mayor Lindsay and the federal Environmental Protection Agency developed a plan to collect tolls on twelve free bridges across the Harlem and East Rivers, banning midtown parking, and significantly reducing the number of parking spaces south of 59th Street. They also proposed to retrofit air filtering devices on cars entering New York City's main business districts. His original proposal, to ban noncommercial midday traffic in Manhattan's Financial District, was reduced to a parking ban at the request of business executives. The parking ban, announced in September 1970, affected a triangular 50-block area south of Fulton Street Lindsay's future proposals upset truckers and merchants who worked in the area and were restricted in scale. A later transportation commissioner said that the plans were fashionable but unfeasible due to unexamined commerce relationships and lack of preemptive buy-in from merchants.

The successive mayor, Abraham Beame, refused to implement the plan, even after federal order in 1975, but environmentalists received a court order in 1976 to proceed with implementation. Congress forbade the bridge tolls and taxi restrictions went into effect; the parking ban was the most controversial and consequential aspect of the act, and its forced implementation was poorly executed. In April 1977, Beame's administration released a report that opposed the addition of tolls, a proposal that future Mayor Michael Bloomberg's congestion pricing plan would address thirty years later. The report supported a bill in the New York State Legislature that, if passed, would permanently ban tolls on the East River bridges. Although such a plan would generate revenue for the city, the administration concluded that tolling the free crossings would cause congestion and pollution without enticing drivers to use public transportation. The state departments of environment and transportation concurred with Beame's position, and in a May 1977 report, recommended that tolls not be enacted, despite the fact that the pollution standards had yet to be met.

Mayor Ed Koch too explored possibilities for a ban on private cars in 1979, only permitting mass transit, delivery, and emergency vehicles. In January of that year, the state unveiled another plan for reducing emissions in the New York City area, with the goal of being in compliance with the Clean Air Act by December 1982. As part of the state's plan, transit fares would be kept low, while passenger cars would undergo emissions tests every year. The same June, passenger vehicles were banned from traveling along 49th and 50th Streets in Midtown Manhattan during weekdays. According to the city's transportation commissioner, this had the intended effect of reducing traffic. The next year, Koch's office sought to ban single-occupancy cars from the East River bridges during weekday morning rush hour, but the State Supreme Court ruled that the city did not have that authority. Other actions, such as bicycle and bus lanes, a reduction in parking spaces, and automobile inspections, were left in place. In 1981, the national administration deemed New York City in compliance with the federal air pollution regulations after a decade of noncompliance. Carbon monoxide levels decreased over the decade with improvements in car emissions. The number of cars inbound to Manhattan continued to rise and vehicle exhaust remained the top source of pollution in New York City.

== 21st-century proposals ==
By 2023–2024, New York City was by one estimate the world's most congested urban area. During that time, congestion pricing in New York City was proposed several times, without success. In the 1990s and 2000s, two major cities introduced congestion pricing, with Singapore's Electronic Road Pricing introduced in 1998 and the London congestion charge introduced in 2003.

=== 2008 proposal ===
On December 12, 2006, Mayor Bloomberg announced his goals for long-term sustainability through the year 2030. On April 22, 2007 (Earth Day), PlaNYC 2030 was unveiled. Along with transportation initiatives, the plan outlined steps to clean up brownfields, create affordable housing, utilize open spaces, provide cleaner and more reliable and efficient energy sources, improve water quality and infrastructure, achieve cleaner air quality, and address climate change issues. The transportation initiatives support greater use of mass transit through various improvements and additions to transit infrastructure and services. In addition, the initiatives also include increased use of cycling, expanded ferry services, increased traffic violation enforcement, and installations of Muni Meters and an intelligent transportation system. Of the 16 proposed transportation initiatives in PlaNYC, the congestion pricing program is the only component that has to be approved by the New York State Legislature with financial support from the State; the remainder is within New York City's or its regional jurisdiction and is to be funded by a new Sustainable Mobility and Regional Transportation Financing Authority, which would also take in revenue from the congestion fees, estimated at $380 million.

New York City applied to be part of the United States Department of Transportation's Urban Partnership Program, which would allocate money to cities that were willing to fight urban traffic congestion through toll roads, express bus services or bus rapid transit, remote work, or technologies designed for the purpose. In June 2007, United States Secretary of Transportation Mary Peters said that out of the nine finalist cities applying for the program, New York City was the farthest along in its traffic reduction planning and the city was eligible for up to $500 million for funding the congestion pricing plan. Since the final funding decision would be announced in August, Peters wrote in a letter to Governor Eliot Spitzer that if state approval was not met by July 16, "it is unlikely that New York City would be selected." Although a commitment was not established by that date, on July 19, the State legislature approved the creation of a 17-member commission that would study different plans to reduce traffic in the city, including congestion pricing. Signed by Spitzer on July 27, the bill authorized New York to apply for at least $200 million in federal funds.

On August 14, 2007, the U.S. Department of Transportation awarded from the Urban Partnership program $354 million to New York City. It was the largest of the five grants awarded to cities, which included San Francisco, King County, Washington (Seattle), the Minneapolis area, and Miami. Only $10.4 million was allocated for launching the congestion pricing program and $2 million for research. The rest of the grant funded transportation infrastructure and services: $213.6 million to improve and build new bus depots, $112.7 million to develop bus rapid transit routes, and $15.8 million for expanded ferry services. The idea of congestion pricing was endorsed by Spitzer, Senate Majority Leader Joseph Bruno, and other New York City politicians, such as City Council Speaker Christine Quinn, Manhattan Borough President Scott Stringer, and Representative Joseph Crowley of Queens and the Bronx, as well as the U.S. Department of Transportation. Assembly Speaker Sheldon Silver and other politicians expressed skepticism about the plan, raising several questions about its viability, its environmental effects on neighborhoods bordering the congestion zone, the lack of state control in Bloomberg's proposal, and what they believed to be a regressive tax on some commuters.

==== Components ====
Bloomberg's proposal cited comparable congestion pricing in London, Singapore and Stockholm. New York City's was to be a three-year pilot program, at the end of which the City and State would decide if the program should be made permanent. Upon final legislative approval, the program could be put into effect within 18 months.

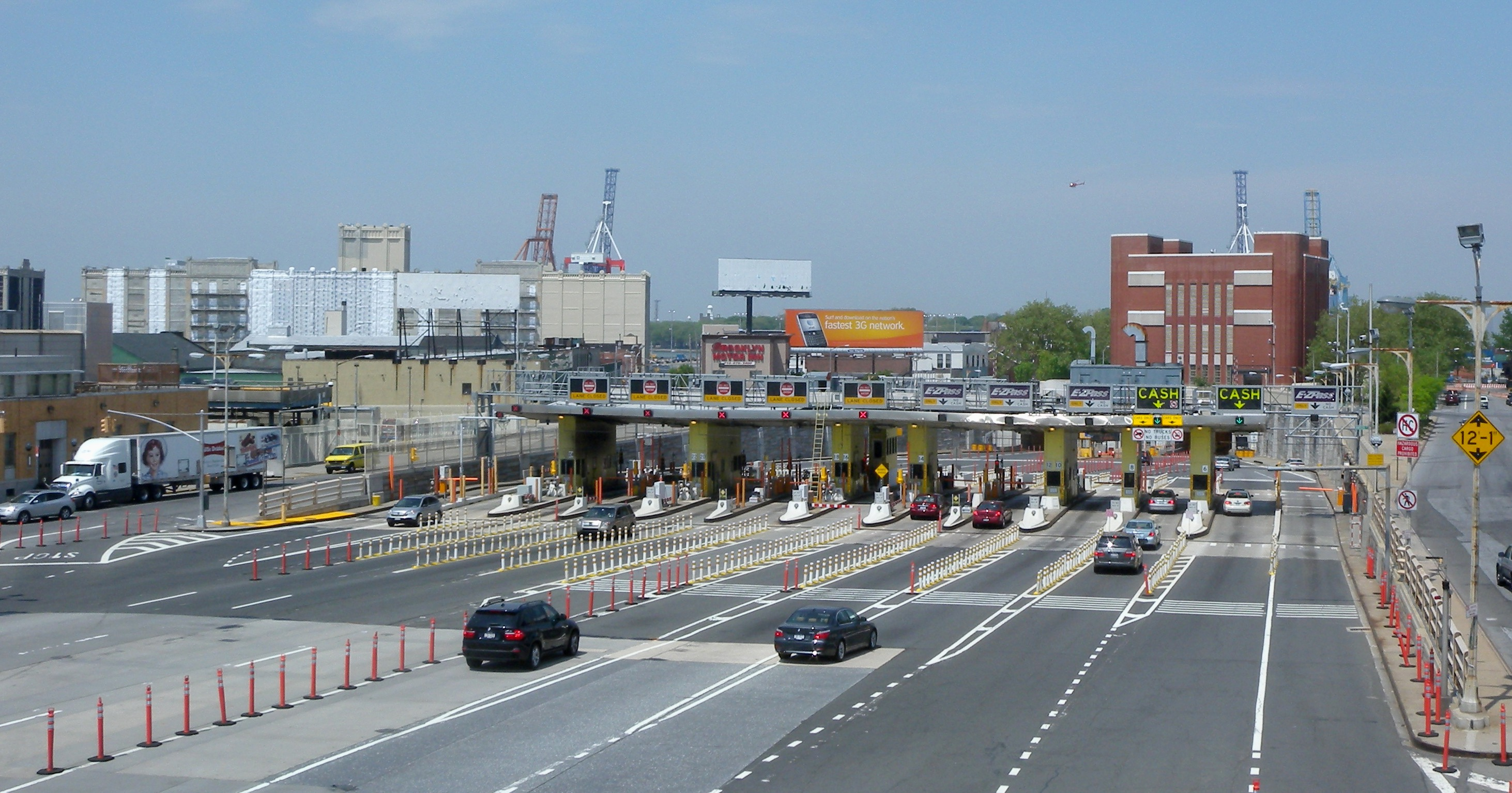
A toll booth for the Brooklyn–Battery Tunnel, which would have been one of the entrances into the congestion pricing zone. Drivers going into the congestion zone would have paid the difference between the tunnel toll and the congestion zone toll.

The proposed congestion pricing zone was defined as the island of Manhattan, bordered by the East and Hudson Rivers south of 61st Street. The northern border of the congestion zone was originally slated to be 86th Street, but this changed after the commission's recommendation released on January 10, 2008. Exempted roadways within the zone include the FDR Drive, New York Route 9A (West Side Highway and Henry Hudson Parkway included), the Battery Park Underpass, and the East River bridges (Queensboro Bridge, Williamsburg Bridge, Manhattan Bridge and Brooklyn Bridge) and their approaches. A free route from the East River bridges to the FDR Drive and from the Lincoln and Holland Tunnels to Route 9A would be designated. Drivers who use toll crossings to or from the zone (e.g. Brooklyn-Battery Tunnel and Queens-Midtown Tunnel) would be charged the difference between the toll and the congestion charge.

The charge would have applied on weekdays from 6:00 a.m. to 6:00 p.m. Proposed fees would have been $8 for cars and commercial vehicles and $21 for trucks entering from outside the zone. Transit buses, emergency vehicles, taxis and for-hire vehicles, and vehicles with disabled parking plates would not have been charged the fee. Taxi and livery trips that begin, end or touch the zone would have had a $1 surcharge. Vehicles would have been charged only once per day.

Operations for monitoring vehicles within the congestion zone will be barrier-free and includes E-ZPass transponders and a license plate recognition system that involves cameras. The system for monitoring congestion pricing will be made separate from existing red-light camera systems. Drivers would be able to pay by a debit from their E-ZPass account or a debit from a pre-paid non-E-ZPass account linked to the vehicle's license plate number. For drivers without traffic payment accounts, they would have 48 hours to pay via phone, the Internet, text messaging, or cash transactions at participating retailers.

==== Reaction ====
The Campaign for New York's Future supported congestion pricing throughout the political discussion. They argued that the plan would reduce road congestion, shorten commutes, reduce air pollution, and raise funds for long-term mass transit upgrades. The Tri-State Transportation Campaign, a member of the Campaign for New York's Future, released an analysis of Census data showing that the vast majority (approximately 93–99%) of workers in the MTA service area, and in individual legislative districts, did not drive to work in Manhattan. TSTC stated that the data showed that congestion pricing was progressive policy.

Several other entities, including the Metropolitan Transportation Authority (MTA), the Partnership for New York City, and the New York League of Conservation Voters, supported the proposed congestion pricing. The MTA, in particular, would have benefited from the proposal; its accelerated Capital Plan for 2008–2013 details transit investments that revenue from congestion pricing would have paid for. These include 44 subway station rehabilitations, increased bus service, new Select Bus Service bus rapid transit in all 5 boroughs, $40 million for suburban park and ride facilities, Metro-North and LIRR station rehabilitations, LIRR third track work, East Side Access, Second Avenue Subway, and Fulton Center.

An August 2007, Quinnipiac University poll found that New York City voters opposed the plan 57% to 36%. Most of the opposition came from the outer boroughs, which, with the exception of the Bronx, would lose their toll-free access under the plan. On the other hand, 58% of voters would support the plan if the funds were used toward improving mass transit. In a subsequent poll conducted in November 2007, the opposition rate had risen to 61%, while support had fallen to 33% A third poll taken in March 2008 found that New York City voters supported congestion pricing by a margin of 67 percent to 27 percent if the money were used for mass transit improvements, and statewide voters supported the plan 60% to 30%, although the majority of New Yorkers surveyed had been unaware that a $1 taxi surcharge was included in the plan. Then-presidential candidate Barack Obama, multiple city and state legislators, and community leaders openly expressed support for the plan.

New York State Assembly Speaker Sheldon Silver, who represented the Financial District of Manhattan, opposed the plan, citing several issues. Since motorists would want to avoid the congestion pricing zone, he claimed they would choose to park in neighborhoods just outside the pricing zone, in turn creating massive traffic jams and add more traffic and pollution to those neighborhoods. Silver also stated that because the plan would reduce traffic in Manhattan's central business district but not necessarily elsewhere, neighborhoods with high asthma rates such as Harlem, the South Bronx, and Bedford-Stuyvesant would not benefit. The installation of cameras for tracking purposes might have raised civil liberties concerns. However, Silver did not oppose the entire plan, and said he would continue to work toward an agreement. Other opponents argued that the pricing could become a tax on middle- and lower-class residents, since those citizens would be affected the most financially. At the same time, higher-income commuters would not be turned off by paying the charges; thus the fee would not do much to discourage traffic into the congestion area. The Queens Chamber of Commerce released a report that concluded that implementing congestion pricing would cause a net reduction in the number of people going into Manhattan's central business district each day. The report stated that the congestion pricing plan could cost the city $1.89 billion per year in economic losses.

In response to many of these issues, Bloomberg argued that a significant percentage of commuters would switch to public transportation, and most likely for all of their commute; thus cars would be taken off the road outside the Central Business District as well as within it. John Gallagher, a Bloomberg spokesman, also said that "toll shopping", a tendency for drivers to seek toll-free routes, will end as all commuters who go to the congestion zone will have to pay tolls.

On July 9, 2007, Assemblyman Richard Brodsky issued a report that called the proposal thoughtful and bold, but expressing skepticism on points including financial fairness and environmental impact. Brodsky called the proposal a "regressive tax" on the poor and middle class and harmful to citizens of New York City's outer boroughs. The report mentioned several insufficiently studied alternatives, though it did not recommend any of them. These alternatives included road space rationing; better traffic enforcement; time-of day pricing on mass transit; taxes on gasoline, payroll, commuting, or stock transfers; and fees on city parking permits.

Keep NYC Congestion Tax Free, a coalition of about 80 civic, business and labor organizations and businesses throughout the New York metropolitan area, proposed alternative traffic mitigation measures that were cheaper and had less impact. The group stated that these measures would raise between $428 million and $545 million in annual incidental revenues, and that this revenue would also qualify for the federal grant. It also recommended revenue measures that would raise nearly $1.8 billion to mass transit projects to induce less driving through better transit service.

==== Vote on proposal ====
On January 31, 2008, the New York City Traffic Congestion Mitigation Commission approved a plan for congestion pricing, which was passed by a vote of 13 to two. Some changes over Mayor Bloomberg's original proposal were introduced, such as reducing the congestion zone, no charges for vehicles which stay within the zone, and a discount for low-emission trucks. The commission estimated that revenues from the congestion charge would generate $491 million a year, which would be committed to improve and expand the region's mass transit. The proposal was approved by the New York City Council on March 31, 2008, by a vote of 30 to 20. The only "No" votes came from Brooklyn, Queens and Staten Island. Brooklyn and Queens strongly opposed the bill in the City Council, voting against it by a margin of nearly two to one; both boroughs, which are located on Long Island, become geographically isolated without access to free bridges as Manhattan and the Bronx block their access to the mainland.

Another alternative considered by the commission, and promoted by Assemblyman Richard Brodsky, was to restrict access into the congestion zone one day a week based on the last digits of the license plates. This sort of road space rationing system is currently practiced in two of the world's Top 10 megacities, São Paulo and Mexico City. Bloomberg's plan was endorsed by the then new Governor David Paterson, whose support was considered key to approving the bill in Albany.

The deadline to approve the plan by the State Assembly was April 7, 2008, for the city to be eligible to receive US$354 million in federal assistance for traffic congestion relief and mass transit improvements. On April 7, 2008, after a closed-door meeting, the Democratic Conference of the State Assembly decided not to vote on the proposal. "The opposition was so overwhelming,...that he would not hold an open vote of the full Assembly," said Sheldon Silver, the Assembly Speaker. Afterwards, the USDOT announced that they will seek to allocate those funds to relief traffic congestion in other cities. Shortly thereafter, most of the federal grant that was to have gone to New York City was instead awarded to Chicago for bus-only lanes and more buses, as well as to Los Angeles for high-occupancy toll lanes.

Coincidentally, by July 2008, high gasoline prices caused a five percent drop in vehicle trips into lower Manhattan. The decrease confirmed the plan's premise that higher driving costs would in fact reduce congestion. However, at the same time, the gas price increase temporarily rendered the congestion pricing plan unnecessary, at least while fuel prices stayed high.

=== 2015 proposal ===
Move NY, a 2015 proposal by former Traffic Commissioner Sam Schwartz, incorporated congestion pricing for central Manhattan and created incentives to travel around the island. These incentives included the creation of a congestion-priced central business district below 61st Street, where drivers had to pay an $8 cash toll or a $5.54 E-ZPass toll to enter the area. The four free East River bridges, all located below 61st Street, would have charged tolls, while outer-borough crossings such as the Throgs Neck Bridge would have seen reduced tolls. Tolls would have also been charged within Manhattan for all drivers traveling below 61st Street. The proposal would have raised an estimated $1.5 billion annually, of which 75 percent would go to the MTA and 25% to the New York City Department of Transportation (NYCDOT). The borough president of Queens, Melinda Katz, opposed the proposal. Bills to implement Move NY were introduced at the state level in 2016, but the legislation never passed.

== Implementation ==
In response to the 2017 New York City transit crisis of the MTA, Governor Andrew Cuomo proposed taking advantage of open road tolling technology and providing a revenue stream for the agency. In 2019, following negotiations, Cuomo and New York City Mayor Bill de Blasio agreed to implement congestion pricing to stem the ongoing transit crisis. Federal officials gave final approval to the plan in June 2023, but Governor Kathy Hochul indefinitely postponed the plan in June 2024, just before it was planned to go into effect. In November 2024, Hochul revived the congestion toll proposal at a lower price point, and the congestion toll went into effect on January 5, 2025.
