= Williamsburg Bridge =

Suspension bridge in New York City

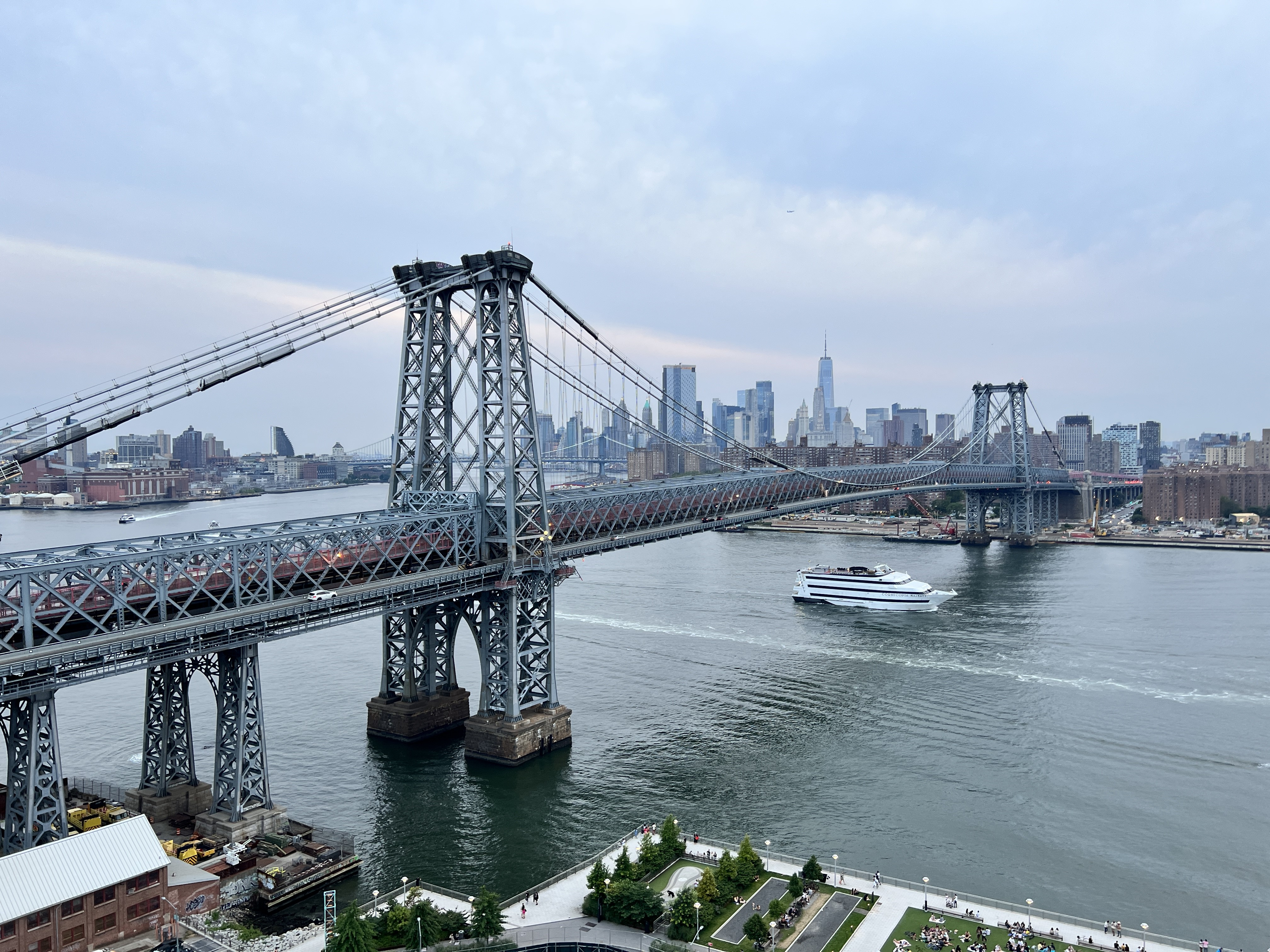
- View from Brooklyn towards Manhattan, 2022
- Coordinates: 40.71356°N 73.97197°W
- Carries: 8 lanes of roadway 2 tracks of the trains of the New York City Subway; Pedestrians and bicycles Streetcar tracks (until 1948)
- Crosses: East River
- Locale: Manhattan and Brooklyn, New York City
- Maintained by: New York City Department of Transportation
- ID number: 2240039

Characteristics
- Design: Suspension bridge and truss causeways
- Total length: 7,308 feet (2,227 m)
- Width: 118 feet (36 m)
- Longest span: 1,600 feet (490 m)
- Clearance above: 10 feet 6 inches (3.2 m) (inner roadways only)
- Clearance below: 135 feet (41 m) at mean high water

History
- Architect: Henry Hornbostel
- Designer: Leffert L. Buck
- Opened: December 20, 1903; 122 years ago

Statistics
- Daily traffic: 105,465 (2016)
- Toll: Variable congestion charge (Manhattan-bound)

Location
- Interactive map of Williamsburg Bridge

The Williamsburg Bridge is a suspension bridge across the East River in New York City, connecting the Lower East Side of Manhattan with the Williamsburg neighborhood of Brooklyn. Originally known as the East River Bridge, the Williamsburg Bridge was completed in 1903. At 7,308 feet (2,227 m) long, it was the longest suspension bridge span in the world until 1924.

Proposed in January 1892, the bridge project was approved in 1895. Work began on June 19, 1896, under chief engineer Leffert L. Buck. Despite delays and funding shortfalls, the bridge opened on December 19, 1903. In addition to roads, walkways, and New York City Subway tracks, the bridge had four trolley tracks, which were replaced with roads in 1936 and 1949. The bridge underwent a substantial renovation in the 1980s and 1990s following the discovery of severe structural defects, and it was again being renovated in the 2020s.

The Williamsburg Bridge's main span is 1,600 feet (490 m) long and is carried on four main cables, which are suspended from two 335-foot (102 m) towers. Unlike similar suspension bridges, the side spans are supported by trusswork and additional towers. The 118-foot-wide (36 m) deck carries eight lanes of vehicular traffic, two subway tracks, and two walkway and bike paths that merge in Manhattan. The bridge is one of four vehicular bridges directly connecting Manhattan Island and Long Island, along with the Queensboro Bridge to the north and the Manhattan and Brooklyn bridges to the south. The bridge also serves as a connector highway to and from the Brooklyn-Queens Expressway (I-278) in Brooklyn.

== Development ==
=== Planning ===
Legislation to incorporate the East River Bridge Company was introduced in the New York State Legislature in January 1892. The company wished to build a suspension bridge across the East River from Manhattan, within New York City, to the then-separate city of Brooklyn. The company was incorporated on March 9, 1892. The East River Bridge Company, led by Frederick Uhlmann, was authorized to construct two bridges from Manhattan to Brooklyn, one of which would run to Broadway in the Eastern District of Brooklyn (which had been the City of Williamsburg until 1855). The United States Secretary of War approved the span to Williamsburg in January 1893 under the condition that the bridge be at least 140 feet (43 m) high at its center.

The East River Bridge Company's capital stock was set at $2 million in mid-1893, and three men were appointed as bridge commissioners. An elevated rapid transit line on the bridge was approved in September. The commissioners submitted a report on the planned bridge to the New York Supreme Court in October, but the Supreme Court ruled in January 1894 that the $2 million in capital stock was not sufficient to fund the bridge's construction. The East River Bridge Company dug a hole for one of the bridge's piers in Brooklyn on February 15, to prevent the company's charter from expiring. The New York Court of Appeals, the state's high court, upheld the Supreme Court ruling in October. The company's directors held a meeting that November to devise a timeline for the bridge's construction. Concurrently, a London-based firm offered to finance the bridge, and the company moved to condemn a property in the path of the bridge's Manhattan approach.

In March 1895, Charles A. Schieren, mayor of Brooklyn, requested that his corporation council draft a bill for the East River Bridge between Broadway in Brooklyn and Grand Street in Manhattan. The same month, the State Legislature considered a bill to terminate the East River Bridge Company's charter. Schieren and New York City mayor William L. Strong agreed in April to jointly fund the bridge and appoint a group of commissioners. Schieren appointed three commissioners that June, and the commissioners proposed hiring an engineer and issuing bonds the next month. Uhlmann proposed turning over his company's assets to the commissioners, who initially rejected his offer. The commission decided to buy Uhlmann's charter in December 1895. A State Supreme Court justice issued an injunction against this purchase in March 1896; this decision was reversed on appeal, and another Supreme Court justice ratified this purchase that June.

=== Initial construction ===
==== Borings and land negotiations ====
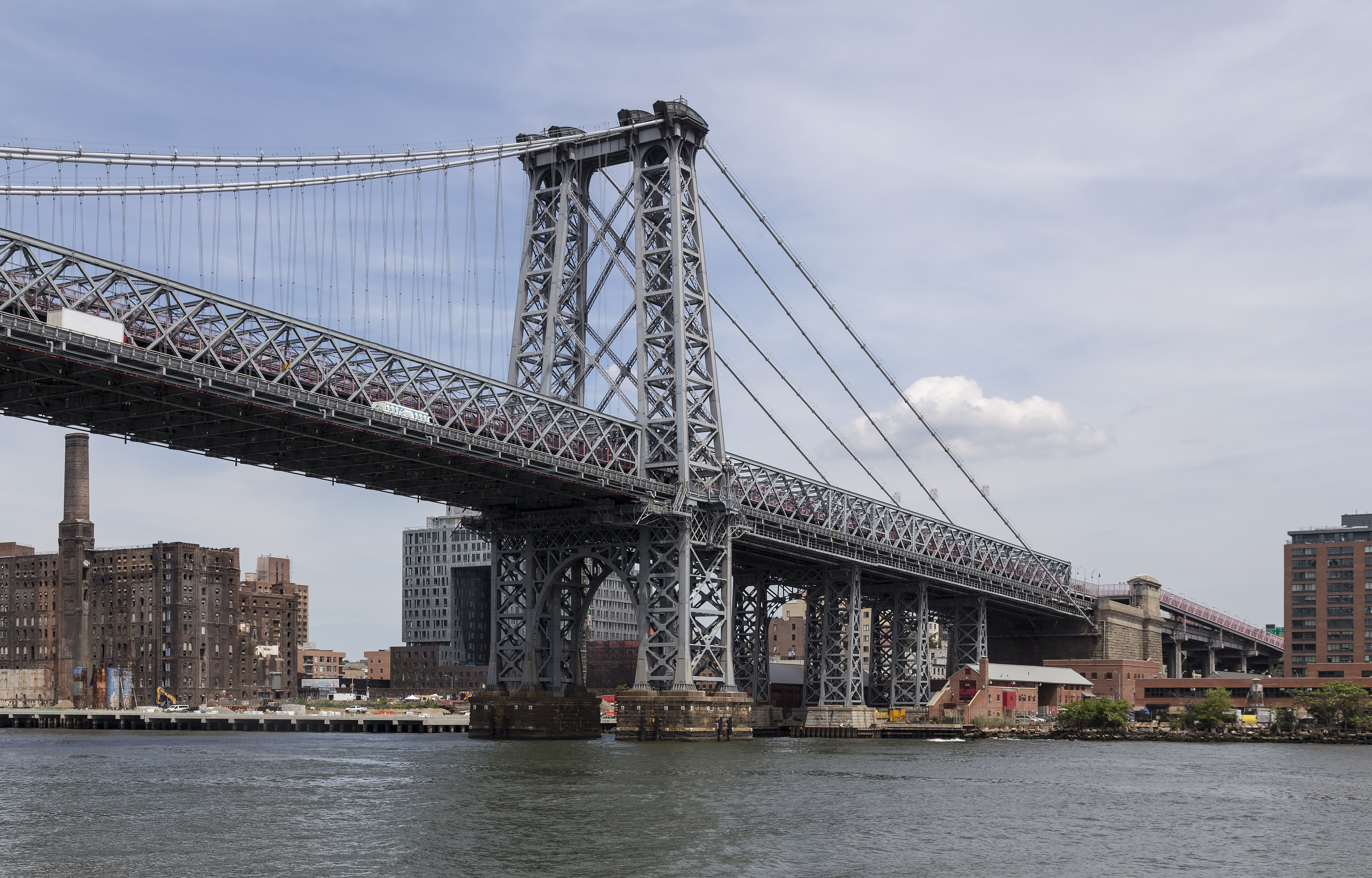
Eastward view of the bridge

Leffert L. Buck was hired as the East River Bridge's chief engineer at the beginning of August 1895. The next month, a contractor was hired to create five preliminary borings for the bridge. Early the next year, the mayors of Brooklyn and New York City agreed to appropriate $250,000 each for the bridge's construction. Buck presented revised plans for the East River Bridge in February 1896, lowering its maximum height to 135 feet (41 m). The revisions were approved by the War Department and the New York Harbor Line Board shortly thereafter, and the commissioners decided to issue $1 million in bonds to fund construction. In March, the East River Bridge Commission requested bids for the excavation of holes for the bridge's caissons. As workers excavated the holes, Buck prepared plans for the bridge's anchorages and piers.

As late as June 1896, the commissioners considered placing the bridge's Manhattan terminus at Grand Street. That month, the commissioners decided to move the bridge's Manhattan terminus to Delancey and Clinton streets to avoid the narrowness of Grand Street. In Brooklyn, the approach was straightened to avoid the Williamsburgh Savings Bank Building. Work on the bridge commenced in earnest on June 19, 1896, when contractors began excavating holes for the towers' foundations in the East River. The final plans were adopted on July 22, allowing the commissioners to request bids for construction contracts. Buck's plans were adopted that August. By September 1896, the bridge's completion had been delayed by one year due to a lack of money. The Brooklyn government and the New York City government both attempted to sell bonds to little avail.

As part of the Williamsburg Bridge's construction, a 200-foot-wide (61 m) strip of land next to Delancey Street was to be condemned. This strip included St. Rose of Lima Church, several schools, and Dutch row houses. The bridge commissioners took over a ferry slip at the end of Delancey Street that had belonged to the Brooklyn and New York Ferry Company in October 1896. In Williamsburg, the bridge commissioners considered either closing or widening South 5th Street. The commissioners negotiated with the American Sugar Refining Company to acquire the latter's land on the Brooklyn shoreline; the commissioners offered the company $350,000 in late 1896, but the firm refused to sell. Negotiations for the land in Brooklyn were still ongoing, complicated by that city's lack of money.

==== Caisson and anchorage contracts ====
The commissioners requested bids for the caissons in October 1896, and Patrick H. Flynn received the contract for the caissons the same month. Flynn obtained land at North 2nd Street in Brooklyn soon afterward and manufactured his caissons at a shipyard there. Caisson workers toiled in three eight-hour shifts of 30 to 50 men each. After the caissons were complete, they were floated to either side of the river. During February 1897, the bridge commissioners took over the land at the end of Delancey Street. New York governor Frank S. Black signed two bills in May 1897, which allowed the bridge commissioners to lease space under the approaches and close part of South 5th Street for the bridge's Brooklyn approach. The first caisson was completed the same month and towed to Delancey Street in Manhattan on May 15. The contract for the Brooklyn suspension tower's foundation was put up for bidding the following day. A cofferdam was built around each caisson to prevent them from being flooded, and workers excavated dirt for the foundations from within the caissons. Colin McLean was hired to build the Brooklyn suspension tower's foundations in June, and the last of the bridge's four caissons was launched in December 1897.

The state legislature passed a bill in May 1897 to straighten the bridge's Brooklyn approach. The East River Bridge Commission paid the American Sugar Refining Company $350,000 for their land in July. The next month, the mayors of Brooklyn and New York City sued several property owners whose land was in the path of the bridge's approaches, and a judge ruled that one Brooklyn landowner who had refused to sell had to give up their land. The commissioners began soliciting bids for the anchorages in September. The Degnon-McLean Construction Company was hired to build the Brooklyn anchorage; a state judge refused to re-award the contract to a competing bidder. Shanly & Ryan, who had been hired to build the Manhattan anchorage, began constructing their anchorage that October. The next month, the bridge commissioners obtained underwater land on the Brooklyn side for the bridge's abutments.

=== Progress between 1898 and 1901 ===
By the end of 1897, Brooklyn and Manhattan were about to be merged into the City of Greater New York. The first mayor of the unified city, Robert Anderson Van Wyck, removed the existing bridge commissioners in January 1898, citing extravagance and delays; he appointed six new commissioners. The old commissioners' removal prompted state legislation for their reinstatement and a lawsuit against the New York City government. A New York Supreme Court justice ruled in June that the old commissioners had to be reinstated, although the decision was overturned on appeal the following month. A state senator proposed a bipartisan state commission in January 1899 to oversee the bridge's construction, but the bill was rejected. The state's high court, the New York Court of Appeals, ruled against the original commissioners in February 1899. Following the passage of further legislation in 1901, the East River Bridge commissioners were replaced with the city's Commissioner of Bridges effective January 1, 1902.

There had been several deaths during construction, with the first fatal accident in December 1897. Another worker was killed by a derrick's boom in 1898; two workers were killed in separate falls from the bridge in May 1900; the main steelwork engineer died after falling from the Brooklyn approach in September 1900; and a foreman drowned in March 1902.

==== Financial shortfalls ====
The commissioners had planned to award a contract for the suspension towers in February 1898, but this was delayed because of the commission's financial shortfalls. Although the commission was promised $500,000 at the beginning of that March, it had less than $1,000 in its bank account and needed $4.14 million to award contracts and pay debts. By April 1898, work was progressing on the anchorages and the piers above each caisson, but the commission had so little money that it could not pay commissioners' salaries or even the rent for its headquarters. Work on the anchorages was also delayed by labor strikes and stormy weather. The commissioners finally received $200,000 that May to pay off existing debts, but the city had yet to issue $4 million in bonds for the bridge's continued construction. The Board of Estimate approved $2.487 million in bonds in July 1898, which was used to pay for the anchorages and foundations. The commission still needed another $640,000 to compensate landowners; the design was nearly completed at this point.

The bridge commission again met in August 1898 to decide whether to solicit bids for the towers and decks. That September, workers complained that they were not being paid; by then, the foundations were near completion. The commission received $2 million the same month, enough to pay off debts through the end of the year. The bridge commission would still be $500,000 in debt at the beginning of 1899, and contracts for the side spans had not even been awarded. A continued lack of funds slowed down construction on the bridge during most of 1899. The Board of Estimate approved $1.5 million in bonds for the towers and side spans in January 1899; it also approved $500,000 in bonds that May for land acquisition and $4 million for cables and land acquisition in July, though the New York City Council delayed a vote on the latter issue, which Van Wyck could not approve until December. Buck estimated that the funding delays had pushed construction back by two and a half years.

==== Tower, deck, and cable contracts ====
In February 1899, the New Jersey Steel and Iron Company received a $1,220,230 contract to build the towers and side spans; the contract was nearly twice the $620,000 cost estimate. A granite cutters' strike the next month slowed progress on the anchorages briefly. By late 1899, falsework was being installed in advance of the suspension towers' construction. That November, the bridge commissioners began requesting bids for the construction of the cables. Washington Roebling, the sole bidder, received the cable contract in December 1899 for $1.4 million, nearly $600,000 more than the bridge commission's original estimate. The pier foundations and anchorages were almost complete by the beginning of 1900. The foundation of the Brooklyn suspension tower was finished that February, while the Manhattan tower's foundations were still under construction. Workers used derricks to erect the pieces of the suspension towers, which measured 15 to 20 short tons (13 to 18 long tons; 14 to 18 t). Because of the extreme heights of each tower, one reporter for the Buffalo Courier-Express described the workers as "giving daily performances of a most daring character", while a reporter for the Brooklyn Daily Eagle described the workers as performing "daily circus feats".

The suspension towers on either side of the river were half complete by May 1900, but work was delayed later that year by an ironworkers' strike. The cable contract was "well under way" by that November, and workers began planning four temporary footbridges to help them construct the main cables. The cable saddles on the tops of the towers were completed the next month. The Carbon Steel Company received a contract in January 1901 for 6,000 short tons (5,400 long tons; 5,400 t) of steel wire. The wires were manufactured in pieces measuring 4,000 feet (1,200 m) long and weighing 325 pounds (147 kg). The first wires were ready to be installed by February 1901, after the wooden falsework had been disassembled. Work on temporary cables for the footbridges began in April and was completed within a month. The first footbridge was completed in June and was quickly followed by the footbridges for the three other cables.

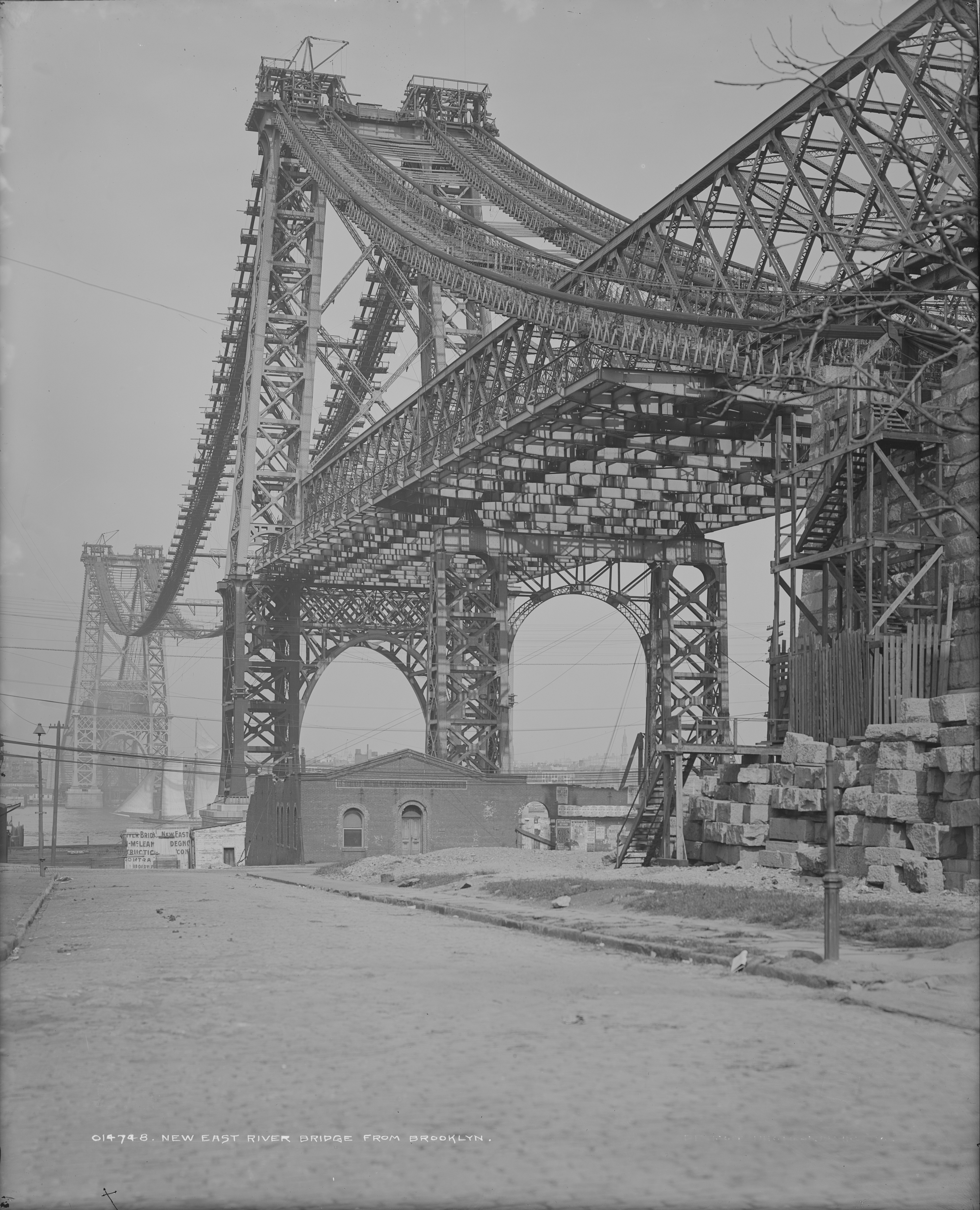
Progress on the bridge after the footbridges were installed

By mid-1901, workers were ready to weave wires for the main cables, and 100 short tons (89 long tons; 91 t) of wire had been delivered to the construction site. A machine was placed on the Manhattan anchorage to weave the wires. The Roeblings also ordered eight guide wires for the wheels that would carry the main cables' wires across the river. The first wire was strung across the East River on November 27, 1901. The Roeblings requested ten months to finish the wires, but city bridge commissioner Gustav Lindenthal refused to extend the deadline past April 1902. Work on each of the four cables proceeded simultaneously. Workers were able to string 50 wires in each strand during a 10-hour workday, or 400 wires per day in total. After each strand was completed, it was permanently attached to the eyebars in either anchorage. To save money, the wires were covered with oil and graphite, rather than galvanized; the Roebling Company was hesitant to use ungalvanized wire, but city officials claimed that the oil and graphite mix was adequate.

The last major contract for the bridge was for the central span's deck. The bridge commissioners solicited bids for the deck in April 1901, and the Pennsylvania Steel Company submitted the lowest bid. Though a local resident sued to stop Pennsylvania Steel from receiving the contract, the city allowed the firm to sublease the work to the United Engineering and Construction Company.

==== Approach contracts and plans ====
The bridge commissioners were authorized to finalize the purchase of land for the Brooklyn approach in December 1899, but it took seven months for the Board of Estimate to approve bonds for the purchase. Buck estimated that it would take four to six months to raze all the buildings in the bridge's path. The bridge commissioners began soliciting bids for the approach viaducts in April 1900 and received bids the next month. More property was acquired for the approaches in June, but the viaducts' construction were delayed because bonds had not been issued and because of disputes over the bids. The commissioners rejected the initial bids for the viaducts and solicited new proposals in July 1900. The following month, a state justice placed an injunction preventing the commissioners from awarding a contract for the viaducts. The injunction was lifted that October, and the Pennsylvania Steel Company received the contract for the viaducts. Van Wyck approved another bond issue of $4 million in November 1900, most of which was to be used to pay the Pennsylvania Steel Company.

For the approaches, the commissioners acquired hundreds of land lots and relocated 10,000 people. Condemnation commissioners were appointed to seize land for the viaducts in both Manhattan and Brooklyn. The Brooklyn commissioners were appointed in November 1900. There were disputes over the qualifications of the Manhattan commissioners, so condemnation in Manhattan did not begin until March 1901. Work on the Brooklyn viaduct began in May 1901, and Pennsylvania Steel began delivering steel for the viaducts that July. The Manhattan viaduct commenced the next month, but a lack of steel delayed further work, and the buildings in Manhattan took longer to demolish than those in Brooklyn. The New-York Tribune estimated that it would cost about $10 million to construct 4,242 feet (1,293 m) of approach viaducts. Although landowners on the Brooklyn side were supposed to have been compensated in 1902, the compensation was delayed by one year.

A street (now Borinquen Place) was planned to run diagonally from the end of the Brooklyn approach viaduct to the intersection of Grand Street and Union Avenue, and the bridge commissioners and local merchants agreed to build the street in 1900. South 5th Street in Brooklyn, which had been replaced by the Brooklyn approach viaduct, was realigned during early 1902. A plaza was also to be created to the east of Driggs Avenue; the city acquired land for the plaza in July 1902. Roebling Street, which led to the bridge's Brooklyn plaza, was to be widened. In Manhattan, several competing proposals were put forth for a street connecting to the Manhattan approach viaduct, each of which cost several million dollars. One particularly contentious proposal was for a street running from the intersection of Delancey and Norfolk Street to Cooper Square. In December 1901, the city agreed to widen Delancey Street, build a plaza between Norfolk and Clinton streets, and extend Delancey Street west to Lafayette Street. A smaller plaza in Manhattan was approved between Suffolk and Clinton streets in early 1903, but there were delays in the widening of Delancey Street. To distribute traffic across the Lower East Side, Allen Street was also widened after the bridge was finished.

=== Lindenthal takeover and completion ===
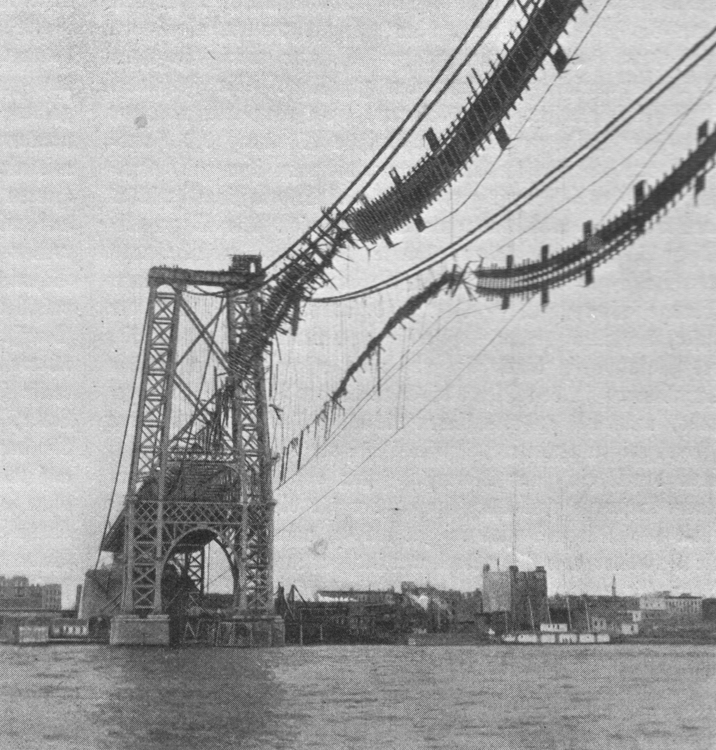
The bridge was damaged by fire while under construction in 1902.

Gustav Lindenthal took office as the city's bridge commissioner on January 1, 1902, and predicted the bridge could be finished within 20 months. The anchorages, towers, and approaches were finished at the time, but the main cables were only one-fifth completed. Edward M. Grout, who became city controller the same year, decided to acquire the remaining land for the bridge via private purchase rather than via condemnation. The East River Bridge was renamed the Williamsburg Bridge in March 1902. Soon after, several engineers working on the bridge resigned, and Lindenthal also asked for Buck's resignation. Lindenthal promised to fine the Roeblings $1,000 a day once their contract expired that April. He made his first official visit to the bridge at the beginning of that May, and he agreed to retain Buck as a consulting engineer. Mayor Seth Low visited the bridge in June, and the main cables were completed later that month.

Hornbostel filed modified plans for the piers and anchorages in July and announced that the bridge would be illuminated at night. Railings were being installed on the nearly-complete Brooklyn approach viaduct, workers began installing vertical suspender cables, and the Manhattan viaduct was proceeding slowly due to steel shortages. That September, public hearings on the widening and extension of Delancey Street were held, and Low approved changes of grade for several streets around the bridge's approach viaducts. The Roebling Company negotiated a contract with Lindenthal in October to avoid paying a fine for the cables, and they also began wrapping the cables with duck cloth. A judge ruled in 1905 that the city could not penalize the Roeblings for the delays.

Following a fire on the Brooklyn side in November 1902, the cables sustained $50,000 in damage. Work on the cables resumed in mid-December 1902. By the beginning of 1903, the Manhattan approach was still less than half complete; workers were also constructing the main span across the East River, starting at either suspension tower and progressing toward the middle. The same month, the waterproofing of the main cables was finished, and the Municipal Art Commission approved some of Henry Hornbostel's proposed decorations for the bridge. After asking Hornbostel to redesign minarets atop the towers, although the revised plans were rejected as too expensive. The Manhattan and Brooklyn halves of the main span were riveted together at the end of February 1903. Contracts for the main span's steel underfloor and wood pavements were awarded that June. The Williamsburg Bridge was 98 percent complete as of that month, and the damaged cables were still being repaired, and workers were painting and riveting the bridge and its approach viaducts.

The Board of Estimate appropriated $1.55 million for the bridge at the beginning of July. By then, residents of Williamsburg had expressed concerns that the bridge would not open as scheduled at the end of that year. The next month, Lindenthal requested bids to infill the tops of the anchorages with concrete, and he received bids for the completion of the roadways and the approach viaducts' decks. Workers also cleared land for the Williamsburg Bridge's Brooklyn plaza and began constructing a playground beneath the Brooklyn approach viaduct. Lindenthal requested bids for the footpaths that September. The flooring and pavement of the bridge's north roadway was laid first, followed by that of the south roadway. By late October, paving had commenced at the Brooklyn end, and Lindenthal had received bids for the paving of the Brooklyn plaza. Almost everything was complete the following month, aside from paving, some riveting, and anchorage arches. Local civic organizations planned celebrations in advance of the bridge's opening. Low inspected the bridge on December 12, a week before its scheduled opening.

== Operational history ==
=== Opening and 1900s ===
Historic film clip of a procession during the opening of the Williamsburg Bridge in 1903

The bridge opened on December 19, 1903, with fireworks and parades. The span had cost $11 million ($316 million in 2025). The footpaths and northern roadway were not complete. No streetcar tracks had been laid, and the rapid transit tracks (carrying the New York City Subway) ended in midair on the Manhattan side and could not be used. Both pedestrians and vehicles shared the southern roadway; pedestrians were allowed to use the northern roadway starting January 21, 1904. George B. McClellan Jr., who had become mayor at the beginning of the year, wanted streetcar service across the bridge as soon as possible. The city's bridge commissioner received bids for the construction of streetcar tracks that April, and one of the dedicated pedestrian paths opened without ceremony on April 23.

At the end of May, the north roadway formally opened to vehicles, and the bridge's lights were turned on for the first time. A street vendors' market opened under the Manhattan approach in mid-1904, despite opposition from some street vendors. Streetcar service on the bridge commenced November 4, 1904; there were surface-level streetcar terminals at both ends. After streetcar service began on the bridge, the Manhattan end became congested. By 1905, officials planned to build underground terminals for both rapid transit and streetcar lines. Upon the bridge's second anniversary in December 1905, the bridge received over $100,000 annually in revenue, but, by the next year, the bridge's revenues were almost entirely canceled out by its expenses. In addition, the bridge's main span had shifted 3 inches (76 mm) toward Brooklyn by late 1906, and rapid transit service on the bridge could not run until the misalignment was fixed.

The Wall Street Journal wrote in 1907 that, even as the rapid transit tracks lay unused, vehicular congestion on the Williamsburg Bridge rivaled that on the Brooklyn Bridge; another critic said that only ten percent of the bridge's capacity was actively being used. The underground streetcar terminal in Manhattan opened in May 1908. When rapid transit service began running across the bridge that September, the Brooklyn Daily Eagle wrote that the bridge's capacity had increased by several hundred percent. The opening of the bridge's rapid transit tracks had been expected to draw passengers away from the streetcars. The City Club of New York, later that year, requested that engineers inspect the bridge. Engineers were planning to strengthen the bridge by late 1909, amid a sharp increase in traffic; the city's bridge commissioners denied that the bridge was unsafe.

=== 1910s and 1920s ===
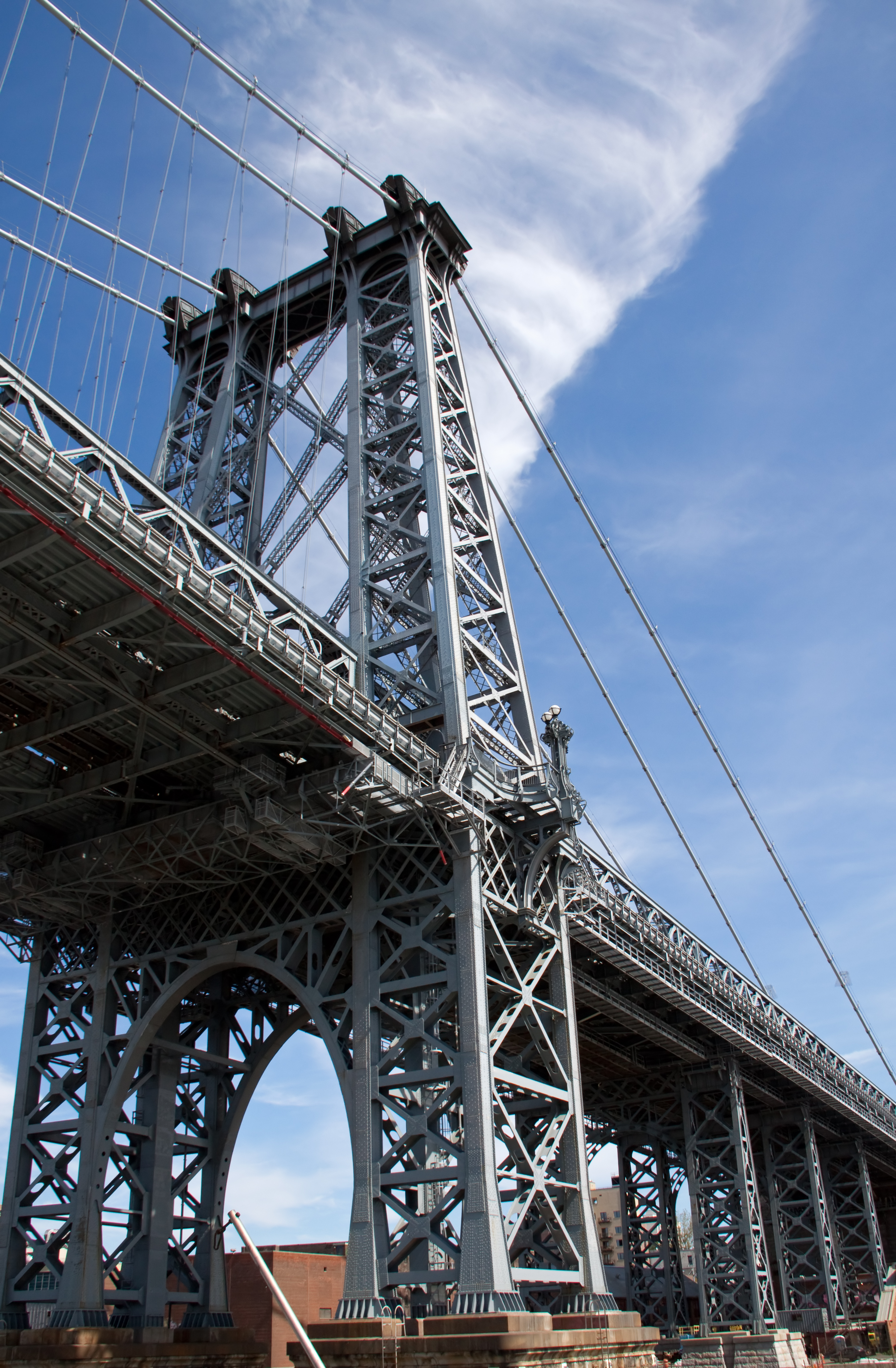
View of one suspension tower

By 1912, some of the smaller cables in the bridge's anchorages had already snapped, as they had not been galvanized during construction. To strengthen the bridge, workers installed new pins to connect the trusses of the approach spans and main span, which was completed in 1914. Workers also added several support towers under either side span. The Brooklyn Rapid Transit Company (BRT) threatened to stop operating streetcars across the bridge in 1915 due to disagreements over streetcar fees. A state judge ruled the next year that the BRT did not have to pay any fees because it also ran rapid transit across the bridge. Through the late 1910s, there were continued disputes over whether streetcar companies should pay to use the bridge. One city official claimed in 1918 that congestion on the Williamsburg Bridge had worsened because the BRT sent streetcars across the bridge without paying any fees.

Plant and Structures commissioner John H. Delaney proposed constructing an extra roadway for motor vehicles in 1919; the southern walkway would have been converted for vehicular use, and all pedestrians would have been required to use the northern walkway. The bridge underwent emergency repairs in mid-1920 following a fire. At the time, commercial vehicles used the north roadway and personal vehicles used the south roadway in both directions. In an attempt to alleviate congestion, during September 1920, the bridge carried westbound traffic only in the morning and eastbound traffic only in the afternoon; it carried traffic in both directions at other times. The next month, mayor John Francis Hylan decreed that all westbound vehicles use the north roadway and all eastbound vehicles use the south roadway. There was an unsuccessful petition in 1921 to rename the bridge after former U.S. president Theodore Roosevelt; another effort in 1922 sought to rename the span the Broadway Bridge, after the street at its Brooklyn end. A galvanized sheath was placed around each of the main cables in 1922 to reduce damage, but water in the main cables caused the wires to rust.

In 1925, Plant and Structures commissioner William Wirt Mills announced plans to construct two vehicular roadways on the bridge for $1.5 million. One of the roadways would have replaced the underused streetcar tracks on the north side of the bridge, while the other roadway would have been built above the remaining tracks on the south side. The same year, the Brooklyn–Manhattan Transit Corporation (BMT), the BRT's successor, announced that it would replace the Williamsburg Bridge's subway tracks. The span carried an average of 35,000 vehicles daily by 1926. An engineering report, commissioned for the city government in November 1929, suggested that an overpass be built over Clinton Street in Manhattan, and that trolley tracks on the Brooklyn side be rerouted, to reduce congestion. City alderman Stephen A. Rudd also proposed linking the Brooklyn approach to Bushwick Avenue to alleviate congestion in that borough.

=== 1930s and 1940s ===
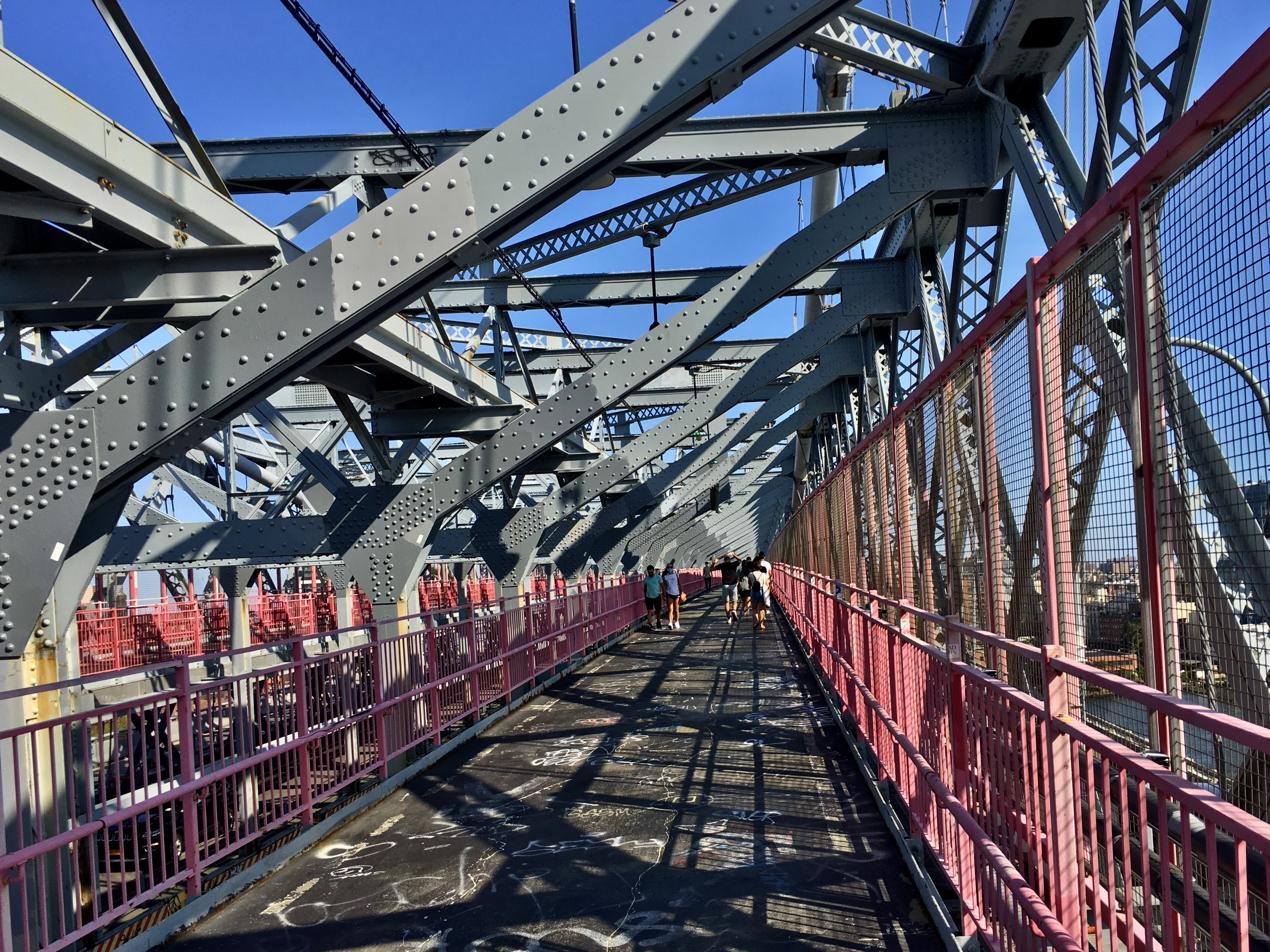
Bicycle and pedestrian path above one of the inner roadways

The trolley lines on the north side of the Williamsburg Bridge stopped running in January 1932 because the operators could not afford to repair the degraded tracks. City officials immediately announced plans to convert the tracks into an 18-foot-wide (5.5 m) roadway; later that year, workers began strengthening the bridge to accommodate the roadway. The tracks were being removed by 1933, but further progress was delayed because of a labor shortage, and work was halted at one point due to a lack of funds. The work also involved correcting the settlement of seven columns in Manhattan, as well as new recreation areas at the bridge's Brooklyn end. Workers also discovered in 1934 that the portions of the cables in the anchorages were leaking. The two additional lanes, forming the northern inner roadway, ultimately cost $400,000 and opened on December 22, 1936, bringing the bridge's vehicular capacity to six lanes. The northern inner roadway initially functioned as a reversible traffic lane. By then, the bridge carried up to 50,000 vehicles a day (up from 2,900 daily vehicles in 1904), and other East River bridges were similarly congested.

In June 1938, the Public Works Administration provided a grant to help fund the replacement of the outer roadways, which was to cost $334,000. The pedestrian path was also to be replaced for $200,000. The city's Department of Public Works closed the northern outer roadway in April 1939 for reconstruction, and it reopened that June. Work on the southern outer roadway began in September, and that roadway reopened two months later, although workers were still rebuilding the railings on both of the outer roadways. As part of a Works Progress Administration project, the approach viaducts of all three roadways were repaved in concrete in 1941. Workers poured 600 U.S. gallons (2,300 L; 500 imp gal) of linseed oil onto the cables during the 1940s in attempts to prevent corrosion.

By 1946, the city government planned to spend $127,000 on structural repairs to the bridge. The southern outer roadway was closed for repairs starting in April 1947, and rollers under the bridge's suspension towers were replaced the same year. The south outer roadway was completed in November 1947, and the north outer roadway was closed in February 1948. Meanwhile, the New York City Board of Estimate allocated $2.6 million in the city's 1948 capital budget to replace the bridge's south-side streetcar tracks with a roadway. All streetcar service ceased in December 1948, and construction on the south inner roadway began immediately after streetcar service ended. The new roadway opened October 31, 1949. In conjunction with these projects, Delancey Street in Manhattan was widened to reduce congestion at the bridge's entrance.

=== 1950s to 1970s ===
The Horn Construction Company was hired in late 1949 to construct a short viaduct from the bridge's Brooklyn end to the Brooklyn–Queens Expressway. This viaduct was completed in 1952, along with a section of the expressway to the Kosciuszko Bridge. During that decade, the city government employed one man to inspect the bridge regularly for cracks in the steelwork and the roadway. The bridge's roadways were repaved, and the structure itself was repainted, starting in late 1961; workers again poured oil treatments on the Williamsburg Bridge's cables a few years later. During the 1966 New York City transit strike, four of the lanes were converted to reversible lanes. Inspectors found varying degrees of corrosion under the bridge's outer roadways in 1969, and the approach viaducts were again repaved the next year.

An engineering consultant recommended in 1971 that the steelwork for the approaches be repaired. Although the approaches were repainted in 1973, the steelwork was not repaired; the bridge was repainted only haphazardly afterward, even though elements vulnerable to corrosion should have been painted every one or two years. The state government started inspecting the Williamsburg Bridge and five others in 1978; the same year, city controller Harrison J. Goldin said the bridge had structural deterioration. The study found that the bridge's main cables were experiencing varying degrees of corrosion, as the anti-rust treatment was actually trapping water in the cables rather than keeping water out. Cracks were also found in the bridge structure, and the bridge was also found to have corroded suspension cables. The city's transportation commissioner predicted that large holes would form on the outer roadways by the early 1980s if the bridge were not repaired immediately. By 1980, the bridge was used by about 82,400 vehicles per day, and an engineering study found severe corrosion in some of the bridge's supports. The city was planning to repair the four free bridges across the East River, including the Williamsburg Bridge, for a combined $1 billion.

=== 1980s and 1990s ===
==== Initial reconstruction and increasing decay ====
In the early 1980s, the city planned to spend $85 million to repair the bridge. One suspension cable had already snapped, while others were rusting; the accumulations of rust on many cables were very hard to remove. The city announced plans to rebuild the outer roadways in early 1981, and mayor Ed Koch provided $4.5 million that May for initial work on the bridge. The North Star Electrical Contracting Corporation was hired to rebuild the outer roadways. The eastbound outer roadway closed that October as part of the project, which was supposed to take 18 months. During that time, all eastbound truck traffic was banned from the bridge. Eastbound trucks were again allowed in July 1982, when the westbound outer roadway was closed. The city government estimated that one out of three suspension cables needed to be replaced. At the end of the year, Congress passed a bill providing $10 million for the replacement of the bridge's suspension cables. The reconstruction of the outer roadways was finished in 1983.

To reduce congestion, in the 1980s, the New York City Department of Transportation contemplated converting some lanes to reversible lanes and placing high-occupancy vehicle restrictions on the bridge during rush hours. The Karl Koch Erecting Co. received a $3.2 million contract for further repairs in early 1983, and some of the main span's steel was replaced that year. By then, state engineers were considering building an entirely new bridge. The cost of repairs had increased to $200 million because all four main cables likely needed full replacement; the Association for Bridge Construction and Design had listed the Williamsburg Bridge as one of the 15 most deteriorated in the New York City area. The Metropolitan Transportation Authority (MTA) announced plans in early 1984 to replace the bridge's subway tracks. One out of every three suspension cables had been replaced by 1985, even as the bridge remained open. The towers, anchorages, and main cables also had to be replaced, and new stiffening trusses had to be installed. Engineers conducted a stress test in 1984, which indicated that the weight of traffic was stretching the cables by up to 9 in (230 mm). An inspection in 1984–1985, which focused on the cables, rated the bridge's structural integrity at 1.6 on a scale of 1 to 7.

By January 1987, engineers had determined that the main cables were only two-thirds as strong as they were supposed to be. Without any repairs to the cables, engineers predicted that the bridge might have to be closed by 1995. The eastbound outer roadway was repaired after two bars fell from the deck in May 1987. At the time, engineers were still drawing up plans for replacing the main cables, and the bridge was also slated for a repainting. Regular inspections of the bridge found that one of the main cables was decaying much more rapidly than the others; in addition, large cracks had formed on approach viaducts. Traffic engineer Sam Schwartz attributed the issues to the bridge's lack of galvanization. After the New York State Department of Transportation started examining four alternatives for replacing the bridge entirely, the Federal Highway Administration provided $1 million to allow the state to study the replacement of the cables. Through late 1987, city, state, and federal officials discussed whether to replace or repair the bridge. Engineers conducted another stress test of the bridge that year and found that it might be possible to repair the bridge.

==== Emergency repairs and design work ====
Thirty engineering firms were invited in early 1988 to submit designs for a potential replacement of the span, which by then was carrying 104,000 vehicles and 85,000 subway passengers a day. The bridge was closed to motor and subway traffic on April 12, 1988, after large cracks were found in floor beams and cables. Inspectors discovered that at least 30 support beams were severely corroded; the damage to the beams had not been detected during the 1984–1985 inspection. The businessman Donald Trump offered to fix the span, while U.S. presidential candidate Jesse L. Jackson walked across the bridge shortly after its closure. An inspection found over 400 instances of hazardous conditions on the bridge, mainly on the approach viaducts. The bridge underwent emergency repairs, which included steel supports under the approaches. The bridge partially reopened to cars at the end of May, then to subways that June; all lanes were reopened by July 1988.

After five finalists were selected in an architectural design competition for a new bridge in June 1988, mayor Koch decided the same month to rebuild the bridge instead of replacing it. Part of the $350 million repair cost was to be funded by $30 million from a statewide bond issue that voters approved in November 1988. By early 1989, design work was underway for the deck, cables, and approach viaducts. Nets were also installed under the viaducts to catch falling concrete pieces.

==== 1990s renovations ====
During the 1990s, the bridge underwent a seven-phase renovation that cost $750 million. A joint venture named NAB/Koch was hired in 1990 to install new suspender cables and retrofit ungalvanized wires with rubber sheaths for $95 million. The cast iron stairway on the Manhattan side, and the steep ramp from Driggs Avenue on the Williamsburg side, were replaced to allow handicapped access in compliance with the Americans with Disabilities Act of 1990. A decrepit walkway on the Williamsburg Bridge was closed in June 1991, and it reopened as a bike path in March 1992. Cable replacement started in April 1992. A painting crew began sandblasting the bridge in June 1992. This work was halted after Brooklyn residents complained about lead dust, and city officials subsequently found dangerously high levels of lead in soil near the bridge.

The northern roadway was replaced in 1996, followed by the southern roadway. Workers planned to construct a temporary viaduct for subway trains while the southern roadway was being rebuilt, but the NYCDOT decided to close the subway line entirely for five months. The subway tracks along the bridge were closed from April to September 1999. Also in 1999, Gandhi Engineering designed and rebuilt the other pedestrian pathway along the Williamsburg Bridge. The rebuilt walkways carried both pedestrian and bike traffic because the pathways were only 12 feet (3.7 m) wide, and were too narrow to carry segregated traffic. The final two vehicular lanes on the renovated span were reopened in 2002.

=== 21st century ===
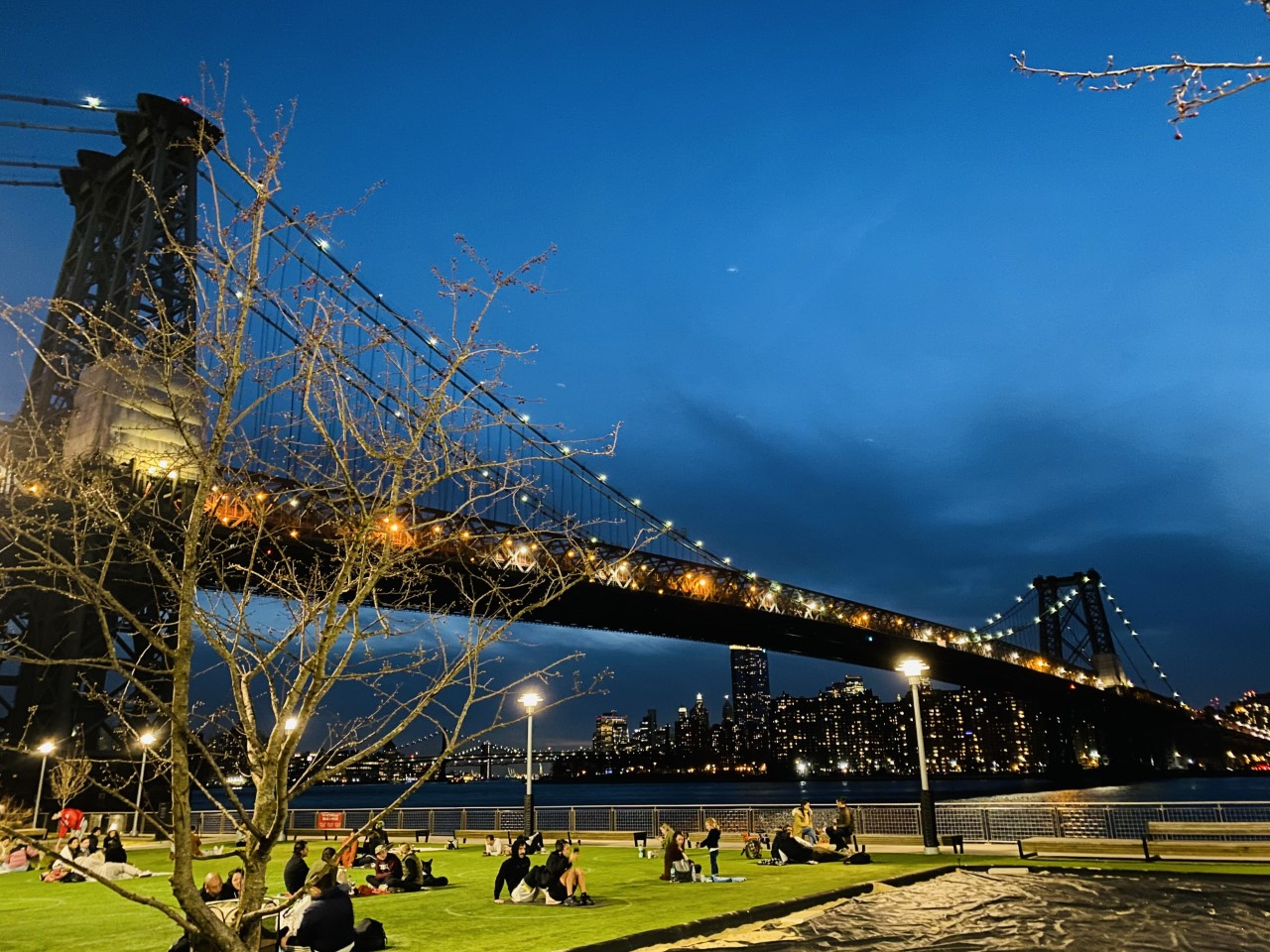
Williamsburg Bridge at dusk, facing from Domino Park in 2021

A celebration with a parade was held on June 22, 2003, to mark the bridge's 100th anniversary. The ornamental lights on the bridge were re-lighted in November of that year after being turned off for eight months due to a lack of funds. The bridge was designated as a National Historic Civil Engineering Landmark by the American Society of Civil Engineers in 2009. During 2011, the NYCDOT rebuilt the Manhattan end of the bridge with a concrete barrier, despite opposition from cyclists.

In 2016, a local resident launched a campaign to rename the bridge for jazz musician Sonny Rollins, whose 1962 album The Bridge was named in its honor. City officials announced in 2017 that the entire bridge would be restricted to high-occupancy vehicles during the daytime, in anticipation of the 14th Street Tunnel shutdown during 2019 and 2020, but these restrictions were canceled after officials announced in 2019 that the 14th Street Tunnel would not shut down completely.

The New York City Department of Transportation (NYCDOT) contracted Skanska to renovate the bridge in November 2022. The project, budgeted at $167 million, was partially funded by the Infrastructure Investment and Jobs Act. Work began in late 2022 and is expected to be complete in 2025. The project involved replacing corroded steel beams, pipes, joints, and valves; patching concrete; and repairing the towers. The National Transportation Safety Board recommended in early 2025 that the bridge undergo a structural vulnerability assessment, following the Francis Scott Key Bridge collapse in Maryland the previous year.

== Description ==
The bridge, including approaches, is 7,308 feet (2,227 m) long and 118 feet (36 m) wide. The bridge reaches a maximum height of 135 feet (41 m) above mean high water at the middle of the river, and the deck is around 122 feet (37 m) above mean high water at either shoreline. Leffert L. Buck was the chief engineer, Henry Hornbostel was the architect, and Holton D. Robinson was the assistant engineer. The bridge required an estimated 60,000 cubic yards (46,000 m^{3}) of concrete, 6.5 million feet (2,000,000 m) of timber, 130,000 cubic yards (99,000 m^{3}) of masonry, and at least 40,000 short tons (36,000 long tons; 36,000 t) of steel. From its opening until the Bear Mountain Bridge opened in 1924, the bridge was the longest suspension bridge span in the world.

The bridge once carried New York State Route 27A. There had been plans to extend Interstate 78 onto the bridge as part of the Lower Manhattan Expressway, which was first proposed in the 1940s. The Lower Manhattan Expressway was approved in 1960 and would have led directly onto the bridge's Manhattan approach; the Brooklyn approach would have connected with the Bushwick Expressway, approved in 1954. Both expressways were canceled in 1971, amid extensive local opposition.

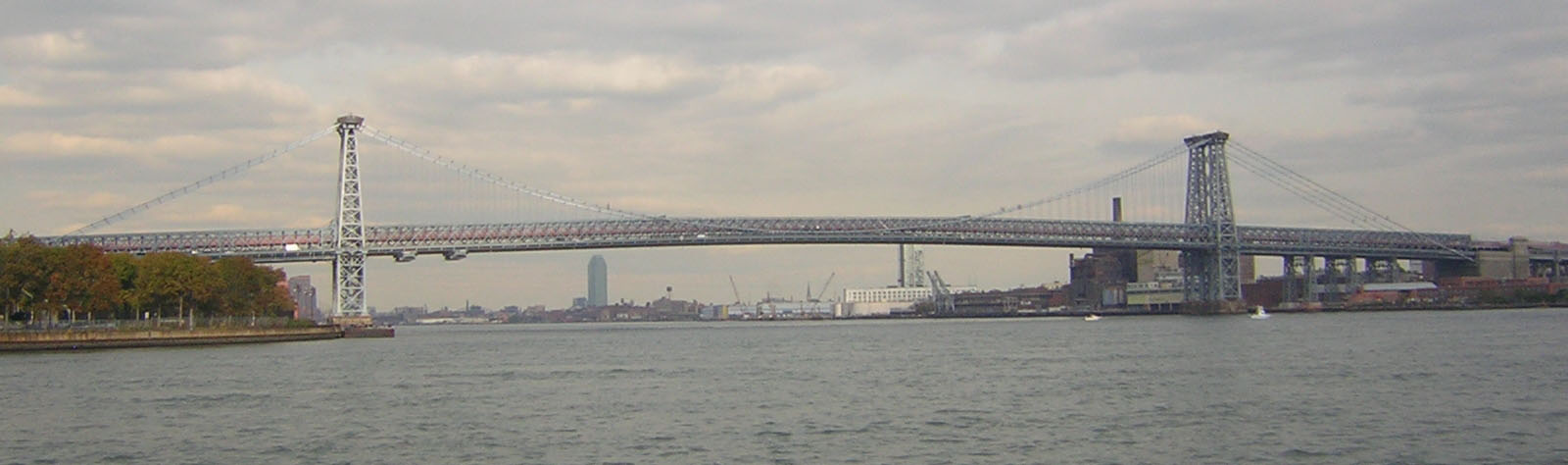
Full span as seen in 2007, from Wallabout Bay with Greenpoint and Long Island City in background

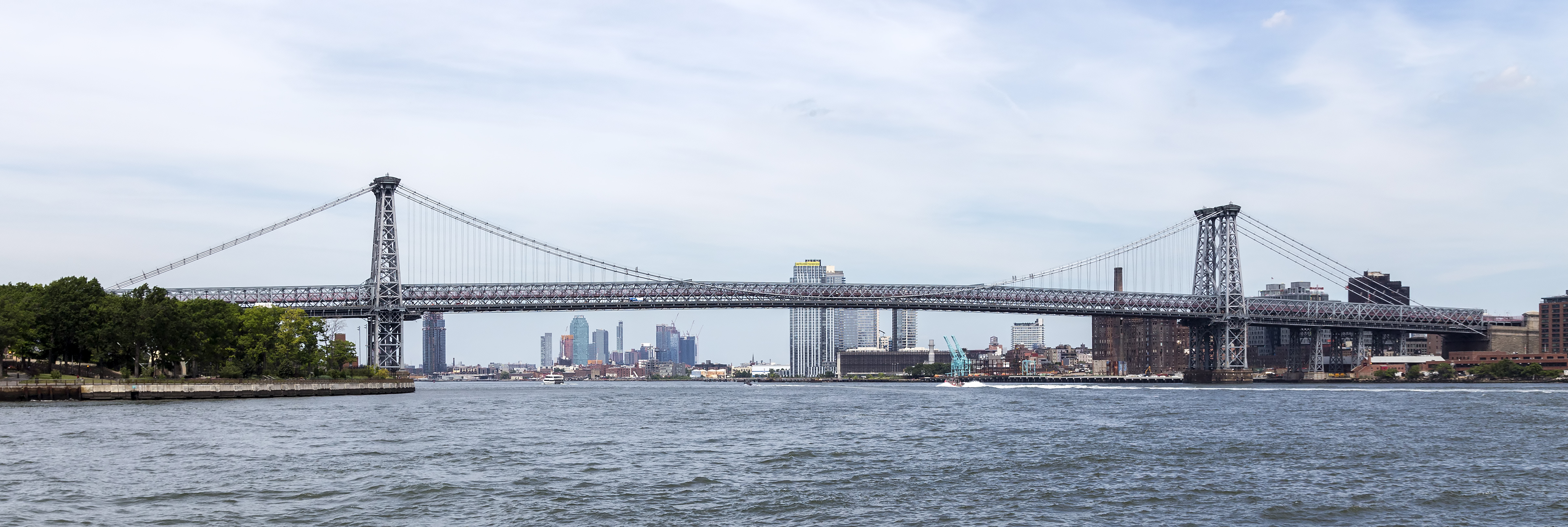
Similar view, 2017

=== Deck ===
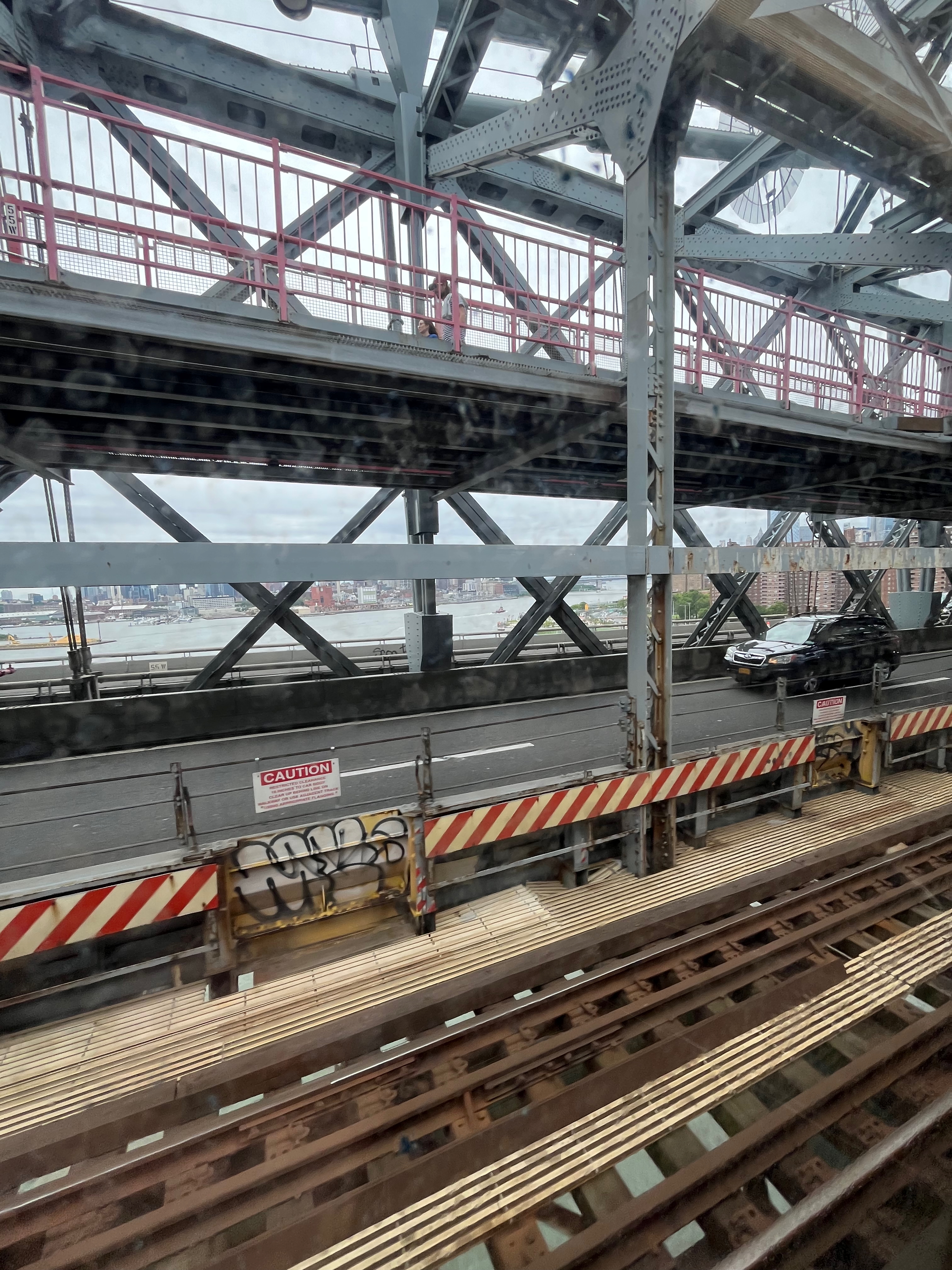
The bridge deck viewed from a subway train. From foreground to background can be seen the subway tracks, inner roadway (originally for streetcars), and outer roadway (beyond the trusswork). The pedestrian upper deck can be seen above the inner roadway.

The deck measures 118 feet (36 m) wide. The center suspension span measures 1,600 feet (490 m) long and mostly hangs from cables, as in similar suspension bridges. A 100-foot-long (30 m) section of the center span is cantilevered outward from either tower.

The main deck is divided into five sections of roughly equal width. The center section contains two rapid transit tracks. These were flanked originally by two pairs of streetcar tracks, which are now the inner roadways. The outermost sections of the deck were used as vehicular roadways from the outset, measuring 20 feet (6.1 m) wide. There is also an upper deck used by pedestrian and bicycle traffic.

The side spans (also known as the end spans), between the tower and the corresponding anchorage on either side, are supported by their trusswork. This was done to reduce the size, cost, and length of the main cables. Intermediate towers support both of the side spans, in contrast to the Brooklyn Bridge, where the side spans were supported by cables. Each of the intermediate towers is composed of two piers with four columns each; the piers rest on masonry footings, while the tops of the columns support the decks of the side spans.

The deck is placed above transverse floor beams measuring 5 feet (1.5 m) deep and 118 feet (36 m) long and spaced at intervals of 20 feet (6.1 m). Vertical ties connect the transverse floor beams with the trusses, and the floor beams themselves hang from the suspender cables. Two parallel trusses on the deck reduce the loads carried by the floor beams. The trusses are placed 67 feet (20 m) apart and measure 40 feet (12 m) deep. The trusses were three times as deep as those on the Brooklyn Bridge, since the deck was to carry four times the Brooklyn Bridge's loads. The trusswork runs continuously from one anchorage to the other and is not rigidly connected to either the towers or the anchorages. Originally, there were heavy lattice railings on the north and south edges of the deck, while the roadway was paved with wooden blocks.

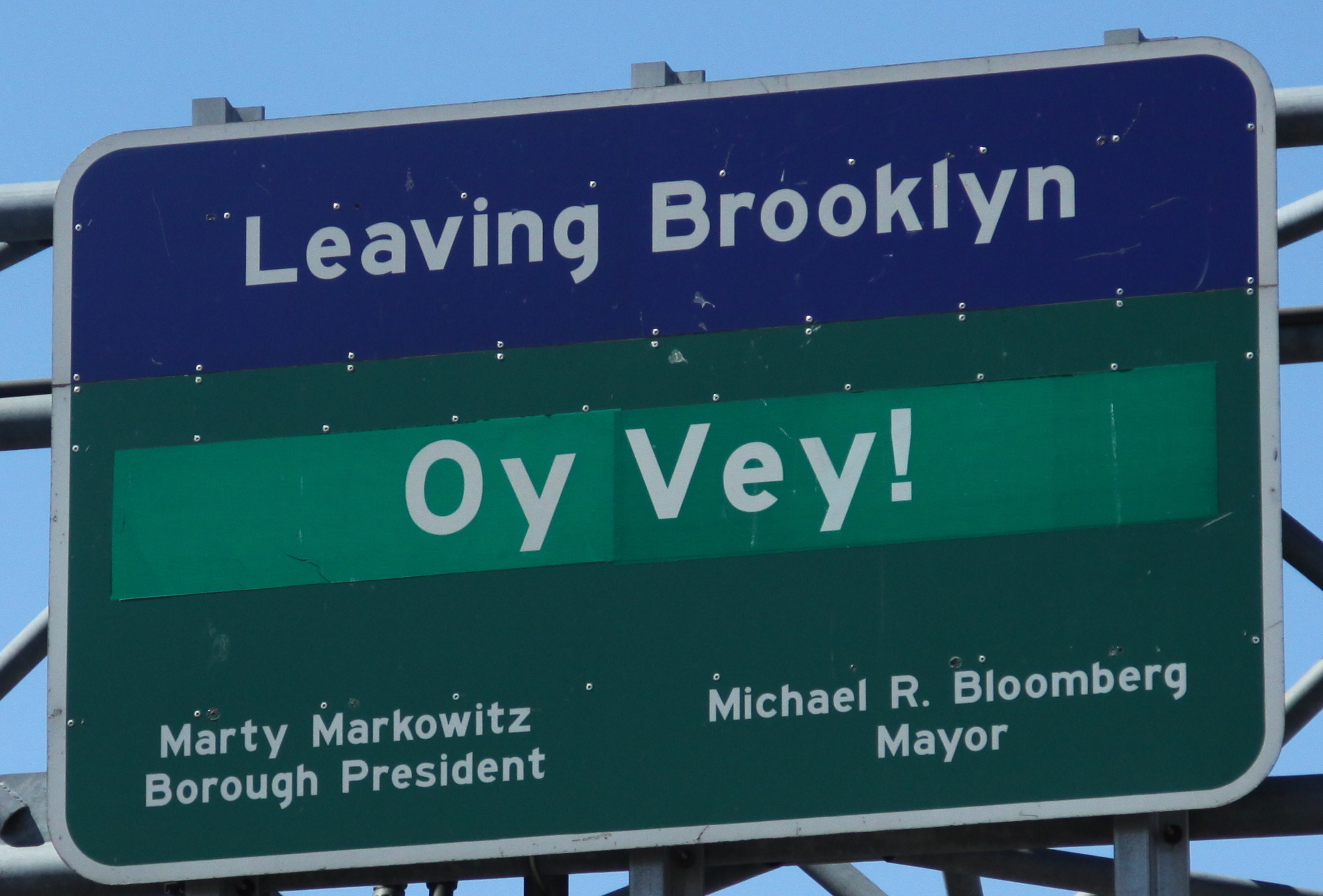
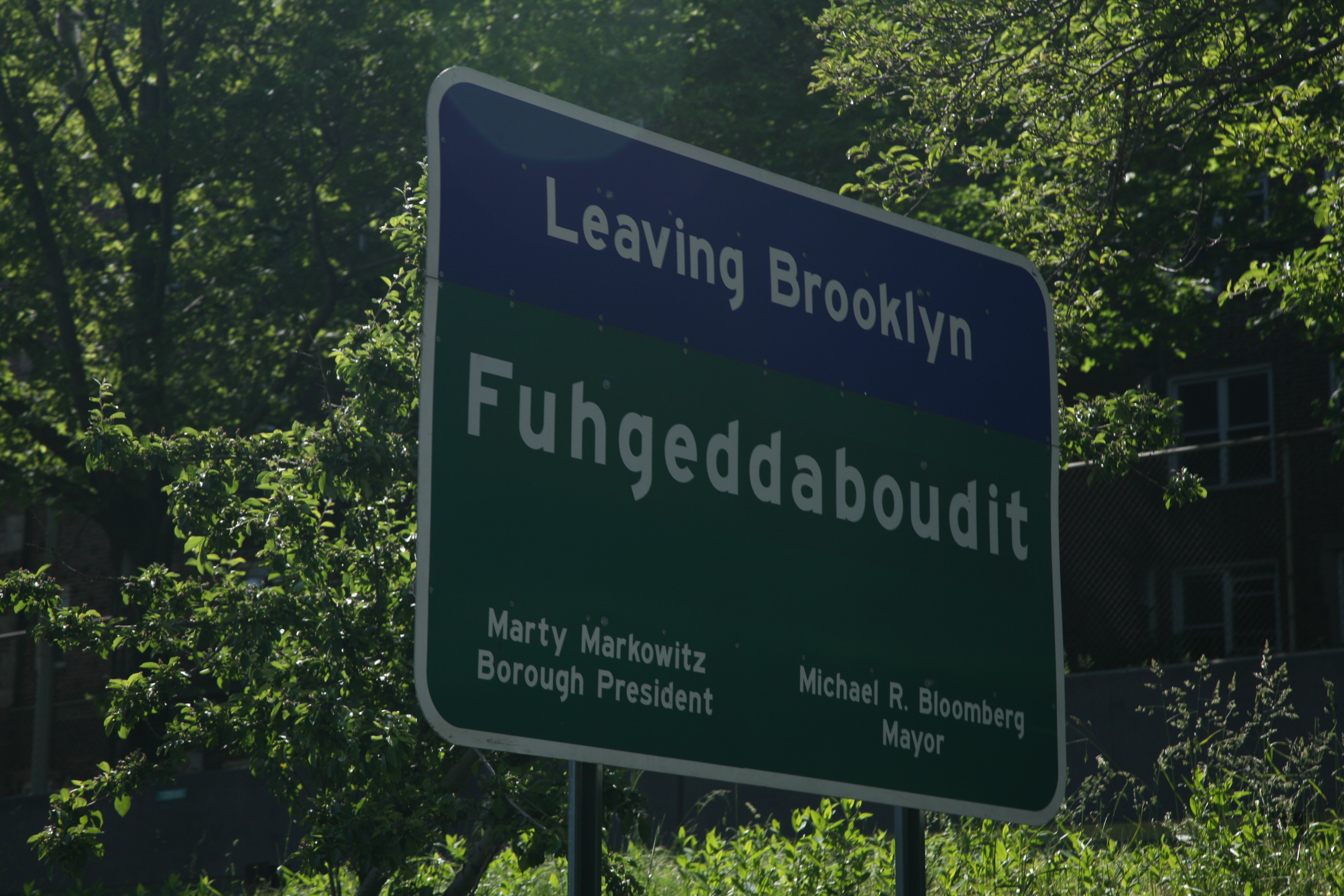
The two "Leaving Brooklyn" signs installed after Marty Markowitz's proposal

The approach spans, between the anchorages and either end of the bridge, have a 3 percent grade. They were originally composed of viaducts with braced columns and masonry foundations. The extreme end of either approach span, where the bridge descended to the street, was made of masonry. The approach viaducts were originally paved with granite. There was once a street market under the Manhattan span. In reference to Williamsburg's large Yiddish-speaking population, a sign on the westbound approach to the bridge reads, "Leaving Brooklyn: Oy Vey!" Another sign says "Leaving Brooklyn: Fuhgeddaboudit". The two signs were proposed by former Brooklyn borough president Marty Markowitz in the early 2000s.

==== Subway tracks ====
In the middle of the deck are the rapid transit (subway) tracks, which connect the New York City Subway's Nassau Street Line in Manhattan with the Jamaica Line in Brooklyn. The Brooklyn Rapid Transit Company (BRT) initially proposed extending the tracks on an elevated structure west to Bowery in 1903, but these plans were canceled in 1905. The Interborough Rapid Transit Company (IRT) also proposed using the tracks in 1905, which would have connected to a subway under Broadway, Sumner Avenue, and Lafayette Avenue in Brooklyn. On the Brooklyn side, the city's bridge commissioners solicited bids for the connection to the Jamaica Line in early 1907. The tracks were first put into use as part of the BRT's Centre Street Loop (now part of the Nassau Street Line), which partially opened on September 16, 1908, with the completion of the underground Essex Street station at the west end of the Williamsburg Bridge.

The subway tracks are laid to standard gauge, and their centers are spaced 11 feet (3.4 m) apart. The subway tracks are generally higher than the roadway, except at the center of the bridge (where they are at the same level) and at the Manhattan end (where the tracks enter a tunnel). As of 2023, the New York City Subway's J, M, and Z trains use the bridge's tracks at the following times:

	Time period
"J" train	All times
"M" train	All times except late nights
"Z" train	Rush hours in peak direction

In 1995, a fatal collision between a J train and an M train occurred on the bridge's tracks; the crash led to widespread changes in the subway's signaling system.

==== Streetcar tracks ====
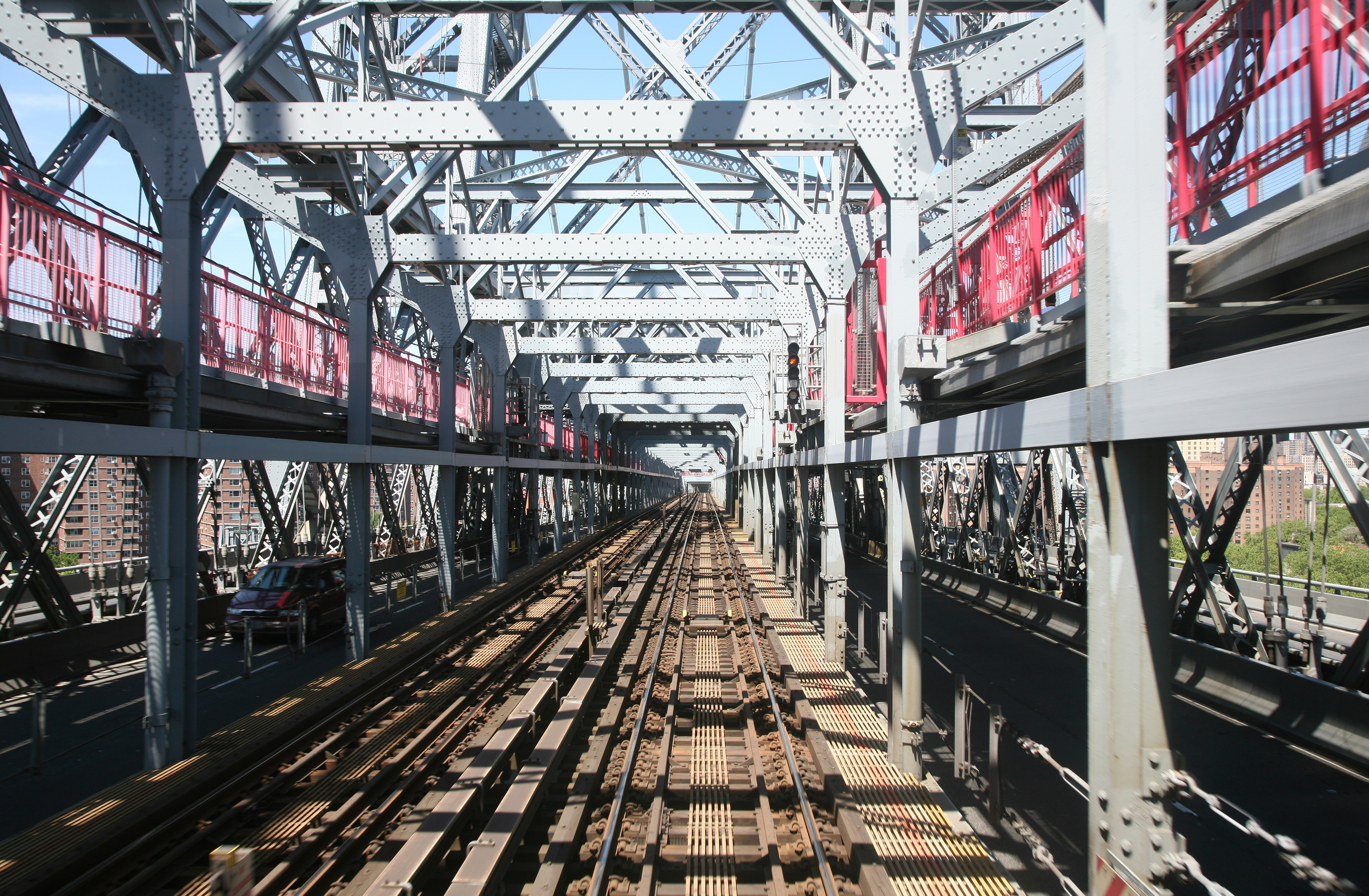
View of tracks on the bridge

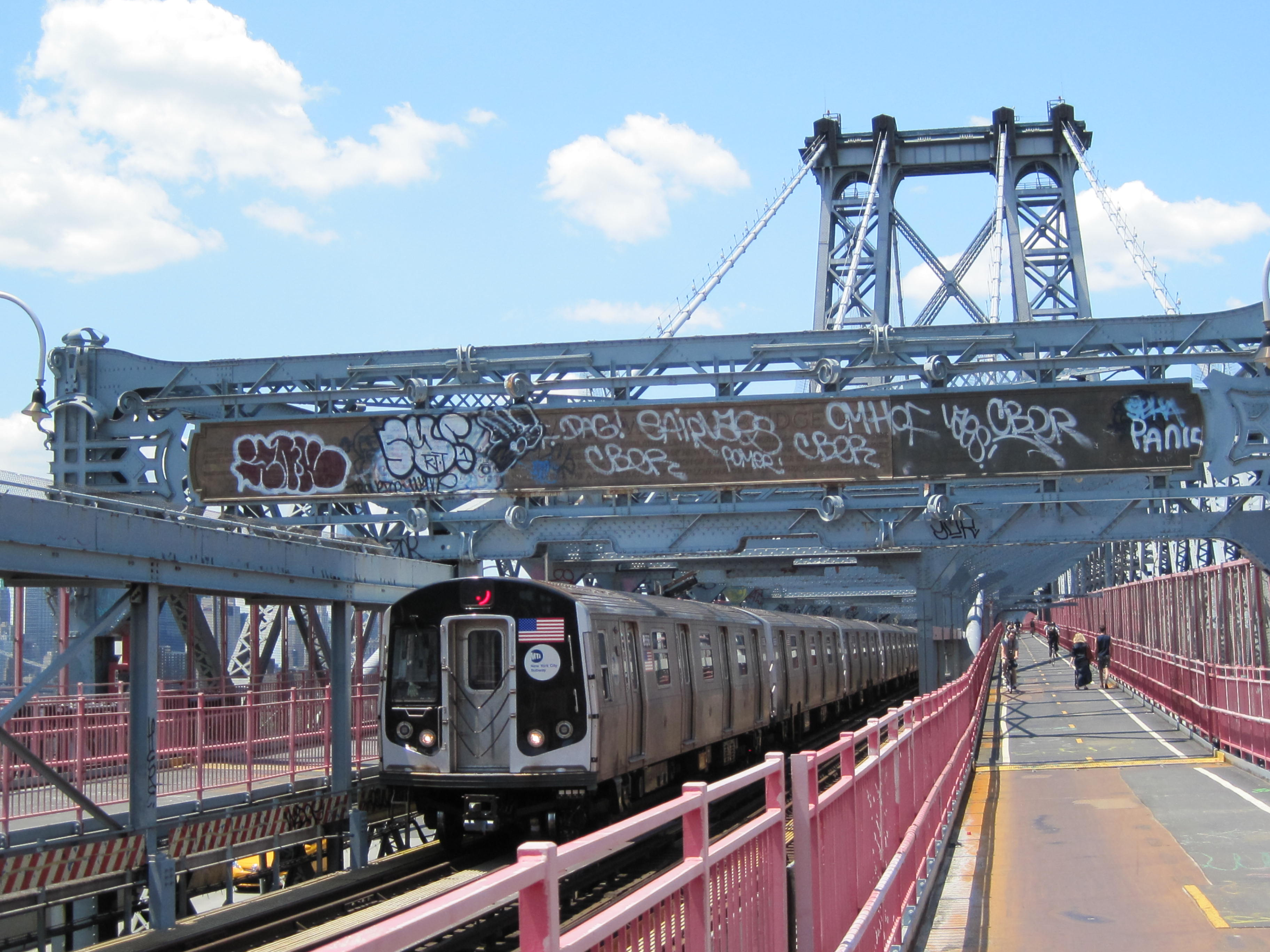
The J train on the bridge's tracks

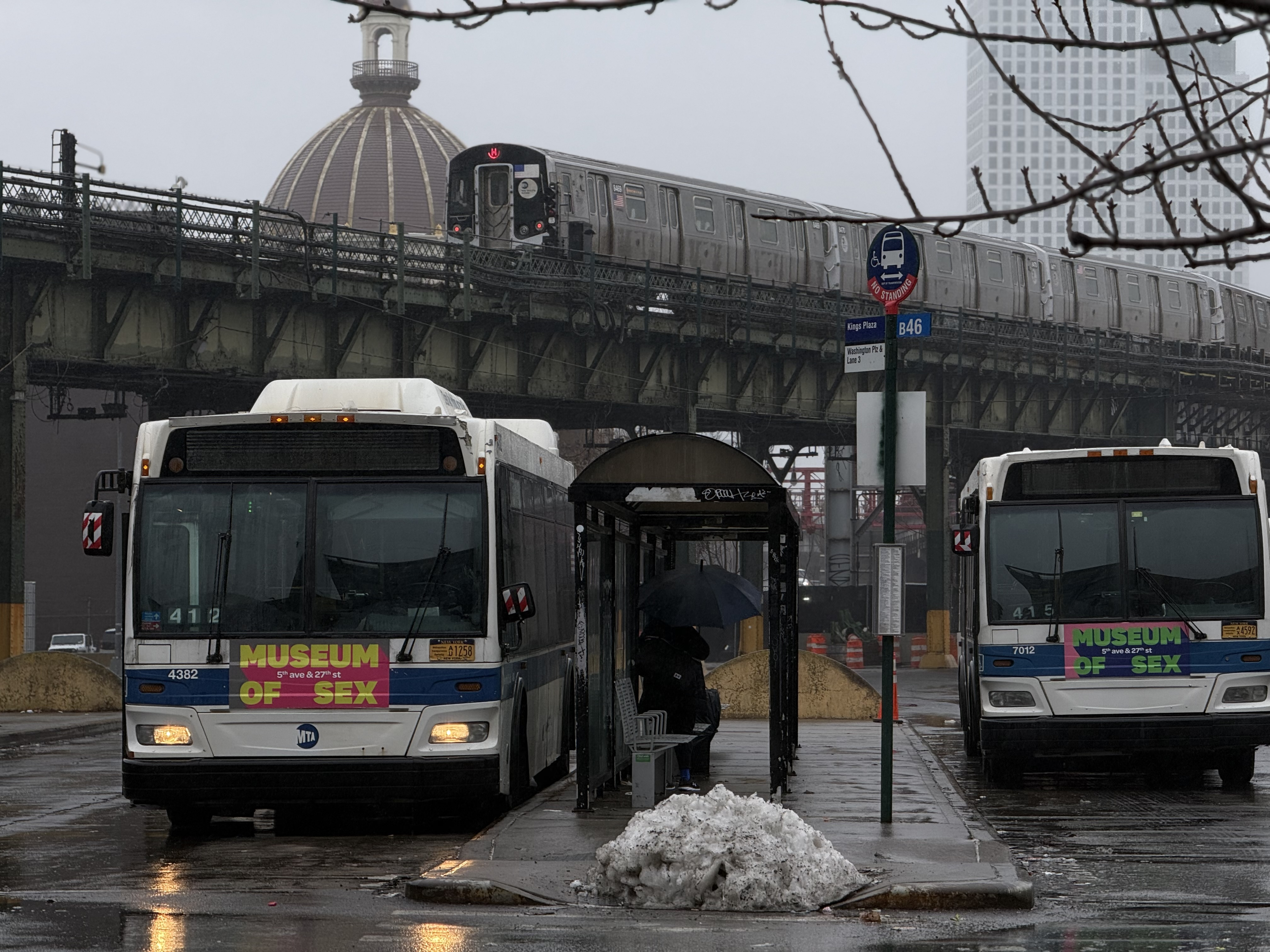
Two MTA buses at the Williamsburg Bridge Plaza Bus Terminal, with an M train in the background

The bridge carried streetcars from November 4, 1904, to December 5, 1948. The streetcar tracks occupied what are now the inner roadways, between the trusses and the rapid transit tracks. When the Williamsburg Bridge was built, streetcar lines from the Eastern District of Brooklyn and the former town of Newtown (now the neighborhoods surrounding Elmhurst in western Queens) converged at the bridge's Brooklyn end. The Metropolitan Street Railway, BRT, and Coney Island and Brooklyn Rail Road (CI&B) shared the tracks. Each streetcar track was laid to standard gauge, and the centers of each track were spaced 9.75 feet (2.97 m) apart. Overhead catenary wires provided electrification for the southern pair of tracks.

BRT and CI&B streetcars originated at various points in Brooklyn and terminated in Manhattan, while Metropolitan streetcars originated at various points in Manhattan and terminated in Brooklyn. The Brooklyn streetcars used two tracks on the south side, and the Manhattan streetcars used two tracks on the north side. After the New York City government took over operation of streetcar lines that used the bridge, the BMT (the BRT's successor) did not operate any service across the bridge from 1923 to 1931.

Streetcar lines on the bridge
Line name	Borough primarily served	Start year	End year
Williamsburg Bridge Local	Shuttle (Note: Though the Williamsburg Bridge Local shared the southern tracks with Brooklyn streetcars, it terminated at both ends of the bridge and did not go further into either Manhattan or Brooklyn.)	1904	1948
Nostrand Avenue Line	Brooklyn	1904	1923
Nostrand Avenue Line	Brooklyn	1931	1948
Ralph Avenue Line, Ralph and Rockaway Avenues Line	Brooklyn	1905	1923
Ralph Avenue Line, Ralph and Rockaway Avenues Line	Brooklyn	1931	1948
Tompkins Avenue Line	Brooklyn	1906	1923
Tompkins Avenue Line	Brooklyn	1931	1947
Reid Avenue Line	Brooklyn	1904	1923
Reid Avenue Line	Brooklyn	1931	1937
Broadway Line	Brooklyn	1904	1923
Franklin Avenue Line	Brooklyn	1904	1923
Grand Street (Brooklyn) Line	Brooklyn	1904	1923
Sumner Avenue Line	Brooklyn	1905	1923
Wilson Avenue (Hamburg Avenue) Line	Brooklyn	1904	1923
Bushwick Avenue Line	Brooklyn	1904	1923
Nostrand-Culver Line and Nostrand-Prospect Line	Brooklyn	1906	1919
Grand Street (Manhattan) Line	Manhattan	1904	1932
Post Office Line	Manhattan	1919	1932
Seventh Avenue-Brooklyn Line	Manhattan	1911	1919
8th Street Crosstown Line	Manhattan	1904	1911
14th Street-Williamsburg Bridge Line	Manhattan	1904	1920
Fourth Avenue and Williamsburg Bridge Line	Manhattan	1904	1911
Desbrosses Street Ferry Line	Manhattan		1924
Third Avenue Line	Manhattan		1924

At the Manhattan end of the bridge was the Williamsburg Bridge Trolley Terminal, which opened on May 19, 1908, under the south side of Delancey Street between Clinton and Norfolk streets. At ground level was an additional terminal for through trolley service; the last trolley lines stopped operating through the Manhattan terminal in 1948. At the Brooklyn end is the Williamsburg Bridge Plaza Terminal (also known as Washington Plaza), an at-grade former trolley terminal that has existed since at least 1903. After trolley service was discontinued, the Brooklyn trolley terminal became a bus terminal. The B39 bus, which replaced a trolley line, is the only surface-transit line that continues to use the bridge as of 2023. There was an additional proposal to establish a trolley stop on the bridge above Bedford Avenue in 1901 and again in 1913, but this never occurred.

==== Pedestrian and bicycle paths ====
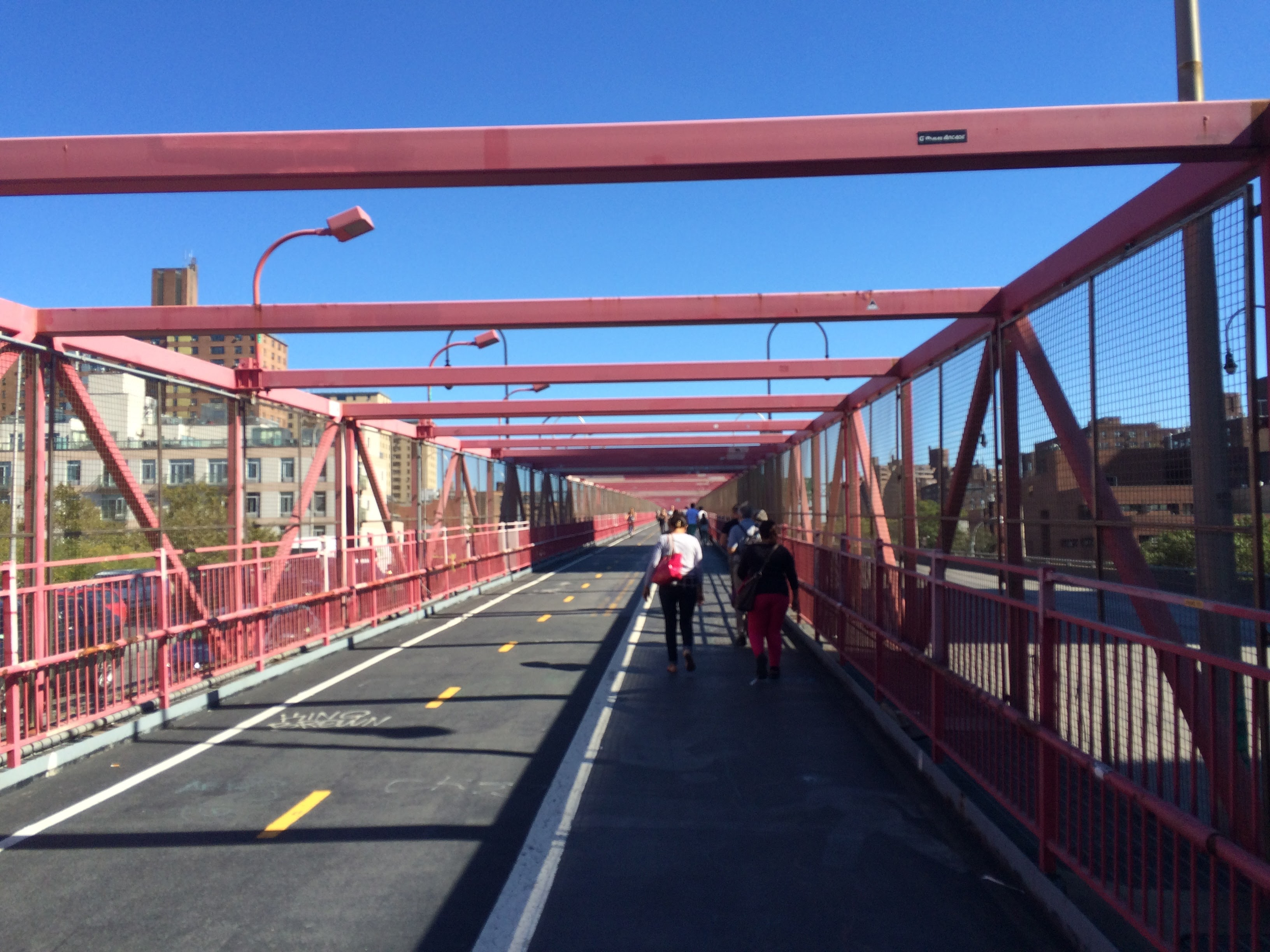
The pedestrian–bike path in Manhattan

From the Manhattan end, a shared bike and pedestrian pathway begins in the median of Delancey Street at Clinton Street. The path is split into separate paths for bikes and pedestrians. Between the two anchorages, the pedestrian and bike paths are placed above the inner roadways and are supported by plate steel floor beams. The pathway to the north ends on South 5th Street at Continental Army Plaza, while the pathway to the south ends at Bedford Avenue.

Initially, the northern pathway was supposed to be used by pedestrians and cyclists heading to Manhattan, and the southern pathway was supposed to be used by pedestrians and cyclists heading to Brooklyn. The pathways were connected by an overpass at the center of the main span. On both pathways, pedestrian and bike traffic was separated by an iron railing. The bike paths measured 7 feet (2.1 m) wide, while the pedestrian paths measured 10.5 feet (3.2 m) wide. By 2002, the bridge had a shared bike and pedestrian path that was only 12 feet (3.7 m) wide. The bridge carried over 6,200 cyclists a day in 2010, making it the busiest bridge for cyclists in New York City at the time; as of January 2026, the bridge carries over 8,600 daily cyclists.

As planned, there were supposed to have been two staircase entrances at Bedford Avenue and one bicycle entrance near Driggs Avenue. A moving walkway was proposed for the bridge in 1902 and approved in 1903.

=== Caissons and towers ===
The suspension tower on each side of the East River is supported by two foundations, which are built to a height of 23 feet (7.0 m) above mean high water. The foundations are placed atop caissons that descend to the underlying layer of gneiss. The centers of each pair of caissons are placed 97.5 feet (29.7 m) apart. The construction of the caissons required 1 million feet (300,000 m) of timber and 100 short tons (89 long tons; 91 t) of steel. The caissons measure 60 feet (18 m) wide, 70 to 76 feet (21 to 23 m) long, and 19 to 25 feet (5.8 to 7.6 m) high. The caissons in Manhattan are 55 and 65 feet (17 and 20 m) deep, while those on the Brooklyn side are 86 and 100 feet (26 and 30 m) deep. The walls of each caisson are composed of four layers of timber planks and measure 2.75 feet (0.84 m) thick. At the bottom of each caisson was a chamber measuring 8 feet (2.4 m) high, while at the top were seven access shafts and a set of air locks. Concrete was placed on each caisson's roof after it was sunk.

Each foundation supports a masonry pier that rises to 23 feet (7.0 m) above mean high water. The piers are clad with limestone masonry below the mean low water level, and they are clad with granite on a limestone backing above that level. There is a massive dressed-granite block at the corner of each pier, supporting the columns in each leg of the suspension tower. Above each of these granite blocks are heavy steel pedestals, which measure 3.5 feet (1.1 m) high, 11 by 11 ft (3.4 by 3.4 m) at their bases, and 8 by 8 ft (2.4 by 2.4 m) at their tops. There are legs on the south and north sides of both suspension towers; each leg comprises four columns that are diagonally braced together. Viewed from above, each leg forms a rectangle measuring 40 feet (12 m) west–east and 24 feet (7.3 m) north–south. The lowest portion of each column tapers to a square cross-section measuring 4 by 4 feet (1.2 by 1.2 m), upon which the columns in the leg rise vertically to the bridge's deck. Above the bridge's deck, the upper sections of the towers' legs are slanted inward and are stiffened by a pair of trusses measuring 45 feet (14 m) high. The tops of each tower are about 14 feet (4.3 m) narrower than at the deck level, and they measure about 333 feet (101 m) or 335 feet (102 m) above mean high water.

Each tower uses 3,000 short tons (2,700 long tons; 2,700 t) of steel in total. When Buck was designing the bridge, he decided to use steel for the suspension towers, as stone towers would have required larger foundations, taken much longer to build, and necessitated a widening of the bridge. According to the principal assistant engineer, O. F. Nichols, the steel towers could also rise higher than masonry towers and allowed the use of smaller main cables, thereby allowing a stiffer bridge. The New-York Tribune wrote that the steel towers would "appear much lighter and, of course, more graceful" than the Brooklyn Bridge's masonry towers.

=== Cables ===
==== Main cables ====
The bridge's cables carry a dead load of 8,000 short tons (7,100 long tons) and were designed to carry another 4,500 short tons (4,000 long tons) of moving traffic. The bridge is built with four main cables, which descend from the tops of the suspension towers and help support the deck. The main cables are grouped in two pairs, one each on the north and south sides of the bridge. At the anchorages on either end, each pair of cables is spaced 34 feet (10 m) apart; they narrow to 22 feet (6.7 m) apart at the top of the towers and 4 feet (1.2 m) apart at the middle of the span. The main cables are "cradled" together at the center of the span, which was intended to strengthen the bridge against wind pressure, and are connected to the ends of large plate girders. The main cables each measure between 18 inches (460 mm) and 18.75 inches (476 mm) across. The saddles at the tops of the suspension towers, which are placed over the main cables, each weigh 32.5 short tons (29.0 long tons; 29.5 t) or 36 short tons (32 long tons; 33 t). The saddles measure 7.67 by 19 by 4 feet (2 by 6 by 1 m) across.

Almost 19,000 miles (31,000 km) of steel wire strands were manufactured for the bridge. Each main cable is composed of 37 strands of 208 wires, (Note: Other sources describe each cable as having 280, 281, or 282 wires.) amounting to 7,696 wires in each cable. The strands themselves measure 3 inches (76 mm) in diameter and are hexagonal; the wires are 3/16 inch (4.8 mm) across. The wires were supposed to have a breaking strength of at least 200,000 pounds per square inch (1,400,000 kPa). The strands were tied together at intervals of 10 to 12 feet (3.0 to 3.7 m). The ends of each strand were wrapped around a horseshoe-shaped steel casting that in turn was attached to an anchor bar. The main cables were wrapped with duck cloth, which was supposed to make them waterproof, and steel plates were then placed over the duck cloth.

A filling, made of graphite and linseed oil, was poured into the strands themselves and into the air pockets between the strands. This filling was also poured into the saddles and within joints. Although Roebling Company engineers claimed the cables were eight to ten times stronger than those on the Brooklyn Bridge, the filling had weakened the cables by one-third by the late 20th century. When the bridge was being built, there were plans to install incandescent light bulbs along the main cables. The lamps, which were first illuminated in 1904, were powered by a waste incineration plant directly under the Manhattan approach.

==== Suspender cables ====
On the main span, there are suspender castings on the main cables, placed at intervals of 20 feet (6.1 m). The suspension cables, which hang from the suspension castings, are each composed of seven strands of rope measuring 1.75 inches (44 mm) in diameter.

==== Anchorages ====
At either end of the main span are massive masonry anchorages placed 570 feet (170 m) or 590 feet (180 m) inland of the shore. The anchorage in Manhattan was between Mangin and Tompkins streets, the latter of which was located near what is now FDR Drive, and the anchorage near Brooklyn is between Wythe and Kent avenues. At its base, the Manhattan anchorage measures 178 by 152 feet (54 by 46 m) across, while the Brooklyn anchorage measures 182 by 158 feet (55 by 48 m) across. Each anchorage rises 80 feet (24 m) above street level and has a foundation 40 feet (12 m) deep. Yellow pine pilings were placed at the bottom of the anchorages' foundations and were covered with a layer of concrete with embedded timbers. Above were a steel grillage and another layer of concrete, the latter of which contained the "sleeves" at the ends of each main cable. The above-ground sections of the anchorages were clad with masonry.

The anchorages had to be capable of withstanding a total pull of 20,250 short tons (18,080 long tons; 18,370 t) from the four cables. Within each anchorage, the main cables pass through a splay casting, where each of the strands separates. There are two anchor chains at the end of each main cable, each of which are composed of 44 eyebars of varying length. The ends of each strand are attached to the eyebars. The lower sections of the chains are held by plate girders. Each girder measures between approximately 5.5 and 5.9 feet (1.7 and 1.8 m) deep. Beneath each girder are anchor plates, which weigh 11.75 short tons (10.49 long tons; 10.66 t); these plates are used to secure the eyebars at the end of each anchor chain.

=== Plazas ===
==== Brooklyn side ====
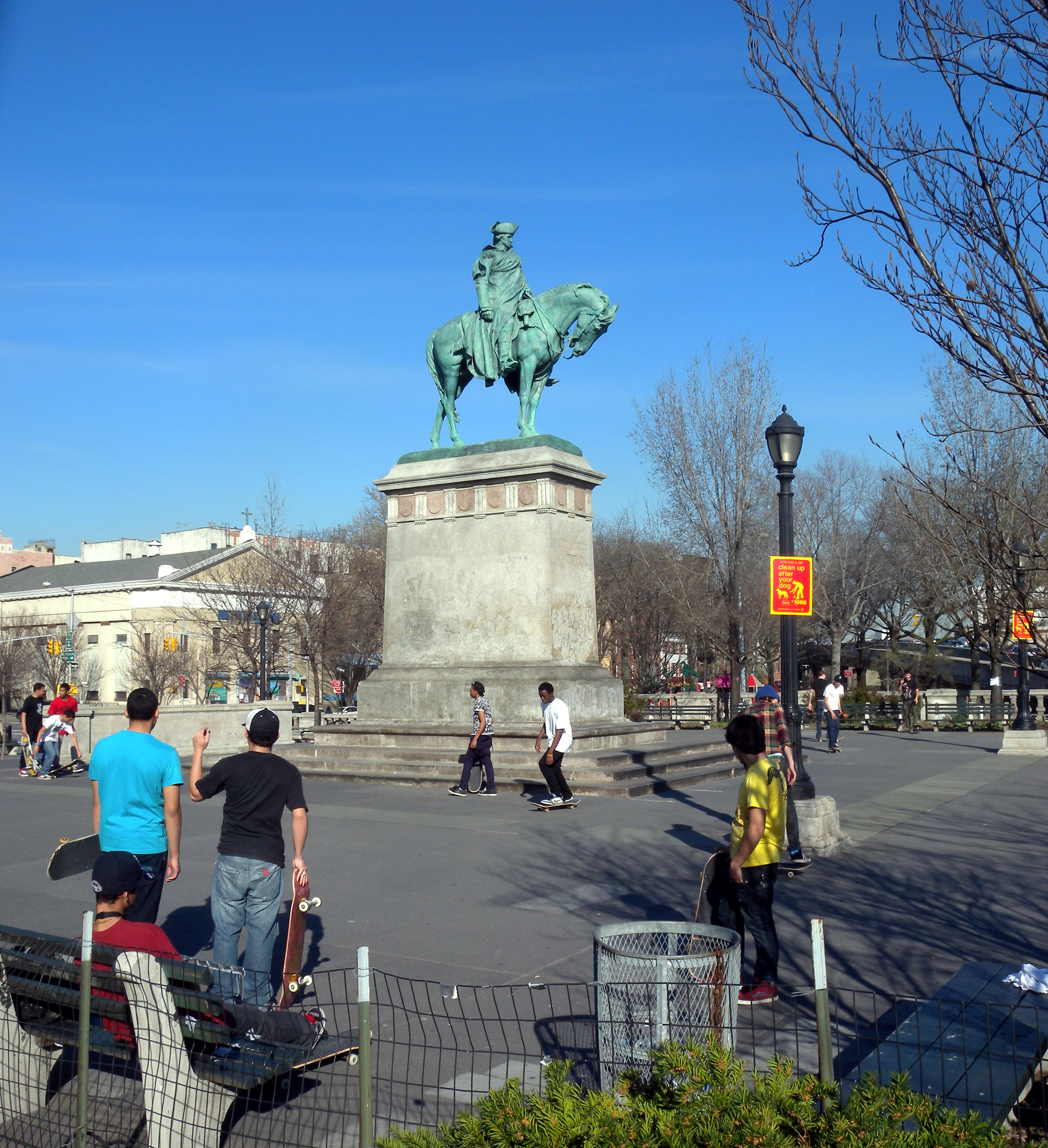
Continental Army Plaza

At the foot of the bridge in Williamsburg, between South 5th Street and Havemeyer Street, are three public areas that collectively comprise a plaza alternatively known as the Williamsburg Bridge Plaza, Washington Plaza, or George Washington Monument Park. It contains Continental Army Plaza and two sections of LaGuardia Playground, both operated by the Parks Department.

The plaza is named after the large statue of George Washington in Continental Army Plaza, sculpted by Henry Merwin Shrady The statue, a gift from Kings County register James R. Howe, was dedicated in 1906. A playground between South 4th, South 5th, Roebling, and Havemeyer streets was proposed in 1932 (replacing part of the trolley terminal there) and opened in July 1935 as LaGuardia Playground. Following the construction of LaGuardia Playground, the plot around the Washington statue was renovated into Monument Park, which was dedicated in July 1937. The playground is split into two pieces by the ramp to the Brooklyn–Queens Expressway.

==== Manhattan side ====
At the Manhattan end of the bridge, the walkway terminated at an elevated promenade at Delancey and Clinton streets, which opened in 1914 and measured 68 by 450 feet (21 by 137 m) across. This promenade was 30 feet (9.1 m) above street level.

== Tolls ==
The Williamsburg Bridge was initially a toll bridge, charging the same fees as the Brooklyn Bridge did. In 1911, the city government conducted a study and found that it had no authority to charge tolls on the Queensboro and Manhattan bridges. Tolls on all four bridges across the East River—the Queensboro, Williamsburg, Manhattan, and Brooklyn bridges—were abolished in July 1911 as part of a populist policy initiative headed by New York City mayor William Jay Gaynor.

In 1970, the federal government enacted the Clean Air Act, a series of federal air pollution regulations. As part of a plan by mayor John Lindsay and the federal Environmental Protection Agency, the city government considered implementing tolls on the four free East River bridges, including the Williamsburg Bridge, in the early 1970s. The plan would have raised money for New York City's transit system and allowed the city to meet the Clean Air Act. Abraham Beame, who became mayor in 1974, refused to implement the tolls, and the United States Congress subsequently moved to forbid tolls on the free East River bridges. The United States Department of Transportation determined that the Williamsburg Bridge was built partially with federal funds and, under federal law, could not be tolled.

A plan for congestion pricing in New York City was approved in mid-2023, allowing the Metropolitan Transportation Authority to toll drivers who enter Manhattan south of 60th Street. Congestion pricing was implemented in January 2025; all Manhattan-bound drivers pay a toll after using the bridge, which varies based on the time of day. Although no toll is charged upon exiting the congestion zone, all Brooklyn-bound drivers must pay a toll to access streets leading to the bridge.

== Impact ==
When the Williamsburg Bridge was under construction, one critic wrote for the Detroit Free Press that the crossing "is to surpass the Brooklyn Bridge as an engineering marvel" and would serve as a model for three other bridges in New York City. The Brooklyn Citizen described the Williamsburg Bridge as the eighth wonder of the world just before the span opened. Despite this, the aesthetics of the Williamsburg Bridge were rarely regarded favorably compared to those of the Brooklyn Bridge.

=== Effect on development and infrastructure ===
After the bridge opened, it became easier to access northern Brooklyn from Manhattan than from Downtown Brooklyn. Jewish and Italian immigrants moved to Williamsburg from Manhattan in large numbers following the bridge's opening. The bridge in particular helped spur the growth of Williamsburg's Jewish community: one newspaper nicknamed the bridge the "Jews' Highway". The American Hebrew & Jewish Messenger wrote in 1910 that, in part because of the bridge's opening, "South Third and neighboring streets [in Williamsburg] are Jewish streets", and several synagogues had been developed near the Brooklyn end of the bridge.

The bridge's completion prompted increased development in Williamsburg, as many residents of Manhattan's East Side moved to the neighborhood, and property values around the bridge's Brooklyn plaza increased after its opening. On the Lower East Side, the bridge's construction led to the development of industrial buildings. After the widening of Delancey Street was completed in conjunction with the bridge's opening, new apartment buildings were built around that street over the next two decades. The bridge supplanted five ferry routes between Williamsburg and Manhattan, which had gone out of business by 1908.

=== Media ===
The Williamsburg Bridge has appeared in several media works. The 1928 Edward Hopper painting From Williamsburg Bridge depicts a now-demolished building as seen from the bridge's walkway. From 1959 to 1961, American jazz saxophonist Sonny Rollins would practice his music on the Williamsburg Bridge's walkway while living on the Lower East Side of Manhattan; his 1962 album The Bridge was titled after the bridge. In 1996, artist Chris Doyle gilded the steps to the pedestrian walkway of the bridge; the project, known as "Commutable", was sponsored by the Public Art Fund. The bridge appears in the background of the opening sequence of American police sitcom Brooklyn Nine-Nine, where the cast walks away from the bridge.

== See also ==
- List of fixed crossings of the East River
- List of bridges and tunnels in New York City
- List of bridges in the United States
- List of longest suspension bridge spans
