= Sam Schwartz =

American transportation engineer

- Sam Schwartz in 2019
- Born: Samuel I. Schwartz; 1947 (age 78–79); Brooklyn, New York, U.S.
- Other name: Gridlock Sam
- Education: Brooklyn College (BS); University of Pennsylvania (MSCE)
- Occupation: Transportation engineer
- Known for: Popularizing the phrase "gridlock"

Samuel I. Schwartz, also known as Gridlock Sam, is an American transportation engineer, formerly the New York City Traffic Commissioner, notable for popularizing the phrase "gridlock".

== Life and career ==
Schwartz was born in Brownsville, Brooklyn in 1947. After graduating from Brooklyn Technical High School in 1965, Schwartz was educated at Brooklyn College (BS Physics) and the University of Pennsylvania (MSCE), and first worked as a New York City cabbie before being hired by the City of New York in 1971.

He served as NYC Traffic Commissioner from 1982 to 1986, and when the traffic department became subsumed by the Department of Transportation he held the second-in-command post of First Deputy Commissioner and Chief Engineer from 1986-1990. While employed with the city, he tried to ban cars from Midtown Manhattan but the project was aborted just before implementation by then-Mayor John Lindsay. He also introduced the first physically separated bike lanes on city streets on four Manhattan thoroughfares (Fifth Avenue, Sixth Avenue, Seventh Avenue and Broadway) in 1980. The project was short lived as Mayor Ed Koch ordered him to remove them after only six weeks. He earned the nickname Gridlock Sam during the 1980 transit strike when he developed a series of transportation contingency plans, called the Grid-Lock Prevention Program.

It was under Schwartz's watch that the city almost became the first city to implement congestion pricing. The city's bridges had not been tolled since 1911 and beginning in 1973 he worked with Mayor Lindsay to reintroduce them. Even with a change in leadership (Mayor Lindsay was replaced by Abe Beame in 1974) it looked like the tolls would be reinstated. However, an act of Congress nixed the proposal in 1977. Congestion pricing was eventually introduced in 2025.

After he left city government in 1990, he started his own firm. He wrote columns for New York City's Daily News, lower Manhattan’s Downtown Express, The Queens Chronicle and in the Yiddish News Report as Gridlock Shmuel.

In 2025 he donated more than $1 million to Roosevelt House Public Policy Institute at Hunter College to start a Transportation Research Program where he serves as Board Chair.

Schwartz made a brief appearance in the 2026 documentary film, The History of Concrete, describing the deteriorating conditions of the Brooklyn-Queens Expressway.

== Works ==
=== Non-fiction ===
- Schwartz, Samuel I. (2015). Street Smart: The Rise of Cities and the Fall of Cars. New York: PublicAffairs. ISBN 978-1-61039-564-9.
- Schwartz, Samuel I.; Kelly, Karen (2018). No One at the Wheel: Driverless Cars and the Road of the Future. PublicAffairs. ISBN 9781541724044.

=== Fiction ===
- Schwartz, Samuel I.; Pepper, Cary (2026). Autokill. New York: Open Road Integrated Media. ISBN 9798337208404.
